= Communes of the Pyrénées-Orientales department =

List of the communes in Pyrénées-Orientales

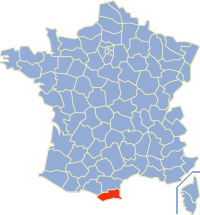

The Pyrénées-Orientales department is composed of 226 communes.

Most of the territory (except for the district of Fenolheda) formed a part of the Principality of Catalonia until 1659, and Catalan is still spoken (in addition to French) by a significant minority of the population. The Catalan names of communes are taken from the Enciclopèdia catalana and are intended for comparison with the official French names: they do not indicate the current or former linguistic status of the commune.

== List of intercommunalities ==
The communes cooperate in the following intercommunalities (as of 2025):

- Communauté urbaine Perpignan Méditerranée Métropole
- Communauté de communes Agly Fenouillèdes
- Communauté de communes des Albères, de la Côte Vermeille et de l'Illibéris
- Communauté de communes des Aspres
- Communauté de communes Conflent-Canigó
- Communauté de communes Corbières Salanque Méditerranée (partly)
- Communauté de communes du Haut Vallespir
- Communauté de communes Pyrénées Catalanes
- Communauté de communes Pyrénées Cerdagne
- Communauté de communes Roussillon-Conflent
- Communauté de communes Sud-Roussillon
- Communauté de communes du Vallespir

== List of communes ==
Name		INSEE code	Canton	Arrondissement	Postal code
French	Catalan	INSEE code	Canton	Arrondissement	Postal code
L'Albère	L'Albera	66001	Vallespir-Albères	Céret	66480
Alénya	Alenyà	66002	La Plaine d'Illibéris	Perpignan	66200
Amélie-les-Bains-Palalda	Els Banys d'Arles	66003	Le Canigou	Céret	66110
Les Angles	Els Angles	66004	Les Pyrénées catalanes	Prades	66210
Angoustrine-Villeneuve-des-Escaldes	Angostrina i Vilanova de les Escaldes	66005	Les Pyrénées catalanes	Prades	66760
Ansignan	Ancinyà	66006	La Vallée de l'Agly	Perpignan	66220
Arboussols	Arboçois	66007	La Vallée de l'Agly	Prades	66320
Argelès-sur-Mer	Argelers	66008	La Côte Vermeille	Céret	66700
Arles-sur-Tech	Arles	66009	Le Canigou	Céret	66150
Ayguatébia-Talau	Aiguatèbia i Talau	66010	Les Pyrénées catalanes	Prades	66360
Bages	Bages de Rosselló	66011	La Plaine d'Illibéris	Perpignan	66670
Baho	Baó	66012	Le Ribéral	Perpignan	66540
Baillestavy	Vallestàvia	66013	Le Canigou	Prades	66320
Baixas	Baixàs	66014	Le Ribéral	Perpignan	66390
Banyuls-dels-Aspres	Banyuls dels Aspres	66015	Les Aspres	Céret	66300
Banyuls-sur-Mer	Banyuls de la Marenda	66016	La Côte Vermeille	Céret	66650
Le Barcarès	El Barcarès	66017	La Côte Salanquaise	Perpignan	66420
La Bastide	La Bastida	66018	Le Canigou	Céret	66110
Bélesta	Bellestar de la Frontera	66019	La Vallée de l'Agly	Perpignan	66720
Bolquère	Bolquera	66020	Les Pyrénées catalanes	Prades	66210
Bompas	Bompas	66021	Perpignan-2	Perpignan	66430
Boule-d'Amont	Bula d'Amunt	66022	Le Canigou	Prades	66130
Bouleternère	Bulaternera	66023	Le Canigou	Prades	66130
Le Boulou	El Voló	66024	Vallespir-Albères	Céret	66160
Bourg-Madame	La Guingeta d'Ix	66025	Les Pyrénées catalanes	Prades	66760
Brouilla	Brullà	66026	Les Aspres	Perpignan	66620
La Cabanasse	La Cabanossa	66027	Les Pyrénées catalanes	Prades	66210
Cabestany	Cabestany	66028	Perpignan-3	Perpignan	66330
Caixas	Quiexàs	66029	Les Aspres	Perpignan	66300
Calce	Calce	66030	Le Ribéral	Perpignan	66600
Calmeilles	Calmella	66032	Les Aspres	Céret	66400
Camélas	Cameles	66033	Les Aspres	Perpignan	66300
Campôme	Campome	66034	Les Pyrénées catalanes	Prades	66500
Campoussy	Campossí	66035	La Vallée de l'Agly	Prades	66730
Canaveilles	Canavelles	66036	Les Pyrénées catalanes	Prades	66360
Canet-en-Roussillon	Canet de Rosselló	66037	La Côte Sableuse	Perpignan	66140
Canohès	Cànoes	66038	Perpignan-5	Perpignan	66680
Caramany	Caramany	66039	La Vallée de l'Agly	Perpignan	66720
Casefabre	Casafabre	66040	Le Canigou	Prades	66130
Cases-de-Pène	Les Cases de Pena	66041	La Vallée de l'Agly	Perpignan	66600
Cassagnes	Cassanyes	66042	La Vallée de l'Agly	Perpignan	66720
Casteil	Castell de Vernet	66043	Le Canigou	Prades	66820
Castelnou	Castellnou dels Aspres	66044	Les Aspres	Perpignan	66300
Catllar	Catllà	66045	Les Pyrénées catalanes	Prades	66500
Caudiès-de-Conflent	Cauders	66047	Les Pyrénées catalanes	Prades	66360
Caudiès-de-Fenouillèdes	Cauders de Fenollet	66046	La Vallée de l'Agly	Perpignan	66220
Cerbère	Cervera de la Marenda	66048	La Côte Vermeille	Céret	66290
Céret	Ceret	66049	Vallespir-Albères	Céret	66400
Claira	Clairà	66050	La Côte Salanquaise	Perpignan	66530
Clara-Villerach	Clarà i Villerac	66051	Les Pyrénées catalanes	Prades	66500
Les Cluses	Les Cluses	66063	Vallespir-Albères	Céret	66480
Codalet	Codalet	66052	Les Pyrénées catalanes	Prades	66500
Collioure	Cotlliure	66053	La Côte Vermeille	Céret	66190
Conat	Conat	66054	Les Pyrénées catalanes	Prades	66500
Corbère	Corbera de Castell	66055	La Vallée de la Têt	Prades	66130
Corbère-les-Cabanes	Corbera de les Cabanes	66056	La Vallée de la Têt	Prades	66130
Corneilla-de-Conflent	Cornellà de Conflent	66057	Le Canigou	Prades	66820
Corneilla-la-Rivière	Cornellà de la Ribera	66058	La Vallée de la Têt	Perpignan	66550
Corneilla-del-Vercol	Cornellà del Bèrcol	66059	La Plaine d'Illibéris	Perpignan	66200
Corsavy	Cortsaví	66060	Le Canigou	Céret	66150
Coustouges	Costoja	66061	Le Canigou	Céret	66260
Dorres	Dorres	66062	Les Pyrénées catalanes	Prades	66760
Égat	Èguet	66064	Les Pyrénées catalanes	Prades	66120
Elne	Elna	66065	La Plaine d'Illibéris	Perpignan	66200
Enveitg	Enveig	66066	Les Pyrénées catalanes	Prades	66760
Err	Er	66067	Les Pyrénées catalanes	Prades	66800
Escaro	Escaró	66068	Les Pyrénées catalanes	Prades	66360
Espira-de-l'Agly	Espirà de l'Aglí	66069	La Vallée de l'Agly	Perpignan	66600
Espira-de-Conflent	Espirà de Conflent	66070	Le Canigou	Prades	66320
Estagel	Estagell	66071	La Vallée de l'Agly	Perpignan	66310
Estavar	Estavar	66072	Les Pyrénées catalanes	Prades	66800
Estoher	Estoer	66073	Le Canigou	Prades	66320
Eus	Eus	66074	Les Pyrénées catalanes	Prades	66500
Eyne	Eina	66075	Les Pyrénées catalanes	Prades	66800
Feilluns	Felluns	66076	La Vallée de l'Agly	Prades	66730
Fenouillet	Fenollet	66077	La Vallée de l'Agly	Perpignan	66220
Fillols	Fillols	66078	Le Canigou	Prades	66820
Finestret	Finestret	66079	Le Canigou	Prades	66320
Fontpédrouse	Fontpedrosa	66080	Les Pyrénées catalanes	Prades	66360
Fontrabiouse	Font-rabiosa	66081	Les Pyrénées catalanes	Prades	66210
Font-Romeu-Odeillo-Via	Font-romeu	66124	Les Pyrénées catalanes	Prades	66120
Formiguères	Formiguera	66082	Les Pyrénées catalanes	Prades	66210
Fourques	Forques	66084	Les Aspres	Perpignan	66300
Fosse	Fossa	66083	La Vallée de l'Agly	Perpignan	66220
Fuilla	Fullà	66085	Le Canigou	Prades	66820
Glorianes	Glorianes	66086	Le Canigou	Prades	66820
Ille-sur-Têt	Illa	66088	La Vallée de la Têt	Prades	66130
Joch	Jóc	66089	Le Canigou	Prades	66320
Jujols	Jújols	66090	Les Pyrénées catalanes	Prades	66360
Lamanère	La Menera	66091	Le Canigou	Céret	66230
Lansac	Lançac	66092	La Vallée de l'Agly	Perpignan	66720
Laroque-des-Albères	Roca d'Albera	66093	Vallespir-Albères	Céret	66740
Latour-Bas-Elne	La Torre d'Elna	66094	La Plaine d'Illibéris	Perpignan	66200
Latour-de-Carol	La Tour de Querol	66095	Les Pyrénées catalanes	Prades	66760
Latour-de-France	La Torre de França	66096	La Vallée de l'Agly	Perpignan	66720
Lesquerde	L'Esquerda	66097	La Vallée de l'Agly	Perpignan	66220
La Llagonne	La Llaguna	66098	Les Pyrénées catalanes	Prades	66210
Llauro	Llauró	66099	Les Aspres	Perpignan	66300
Llo	Llo	66100	Les Pyrénées catalanes	Prades	66800
Llupia	Llupia	66101	Les Aspres	Perpignan	66300
Mantet	Mentet	66102	Le Canigou	Prades	66360
Marquixanes	Marquixanes	66103	Le Canigou	Prades	66320
Los Masos	Els Masos	66104	Les Pyrénées catalanes	Prades	66500
Matemale	Matamala	66105	Les Pyrénées catalanes	Prades	66210
Maureillas-las-Illas	Morellas i les Illes	66106	Vallespir-Albères	Céret	66480
Maury	Maurí	66107	La Vallée de l'Agly	Perpignan	66460
Millas	Millars	66108	La Vallée de la Têt	Perpignan	66170
Molitg-les-Bains	Molig	66109	Les Pyrénées catalanes	Prades	66500
Montalba-le-Château	Montalba del Castell	66111	La Vallée de la Têt	Prades	66130
Montauriol	Montoriol	66112	Les Aspres	Céret	66300
Montbolo	Montboló	66113	Le Canigou	Céret	66110
Montescot	Montescot	66114	La Plaine d'Illibéris	Perpignan	66200
Montesquieu-des-Albères	Montiesquiu d'Albera	66115	Vallespir-Albères	Céret	66740
Montferrer	Montferrer	66116	Le Canigou	Céret	66150
Mont-Louis	Montlluís	66117	Les Pyrénées catalanes	Prades	66210
Montner	Montner	66118	La Vallée de l'Agly	Perpignan	66720
Mosset	Mosset	66119	Les Pyrénées catalanes	Prades	66500
Nahuja	Naüja	66120	Les Pyrénées catalanes	Prades	66340
Néfiach	Nefiac	66121	La Vallée de la Têt	Perpignan	66170
Nohèdes	Noedes	66122	Les Pyrénées catalanes	Prades	66500
Nyer	Nyer	66123	Les Pyrénées catalanes	Prades	66360
Olette	Oleta	66125	Les Pyrénées catalanes	Prades	66360
Oms	Oms	66126	Les Aspres	Céret	66400
Opoul-Périllos	Òpol i Perellós	66127	La Vallée de l'Agly	Perpignan	66600
Oreilla	Orellà	66128	Les Pyrénées catalanes	Prades	66360
Ortaffa	Ortafà	66129	La Plaine d'Illibéris	Perpignan	66560
Osséja	Osseja	66130	Les Pyrénées catalanes	Prades	66340
Palau-de-Cerdagne	Palau de Cerdanya	66132	Les Pyrénées catalanes	Prades	66340
Palau-del-Vidre	Palau del Vidre	66133	La Côte Vermeille	Céret	66690
Passa	Paça	66134	Les Aspres	Perpignan	66300
Perpignan	Perpinyà	66136	Perpignan 1–6	Perpignan	66000
Le Perthus	El Pertús	66137	Vallespir-Albères	Céret	66480
Peyrestortes	Perestortes	66138	Le Ribéral	Perpignan	66600
Pézilla-de-Conflent	Pesillà de Conflent	66139	La Vallée de l'Agly	Prades	66730
Pézilla-la-Rivière	Pesillà de la Ribera	66140	Le Ribéral	Perpignan	66370
Pia	Pià	66141	La Côte Salanquaise	Perpignan	66380
Planès	Planès	66142	Les Pyrénées catalanes	Prades	66210
Planèzes	Planeses	66143	La Vallée de l'Agly	Perpignan	66720
Pollestres	Pollestres	66144	Les Aspres	Perpignan	66450
Ponteilla	Pontellà	66145	Les Aspres	Perpignan	66300
Porta	Porta	66146	Les Pyrénées catalanes	Prades	66760
Porté-Puymorens	Portè	66147	Les Pyrénées catalanes	Prades	66760
Port-Vendres	Portvendres	66148	La Côte Vermeille	Céret	66660
Prades	Prada	66149	Les Pyrénées catalanes	Prades	66500
Prats-de-Mollo-la-Preste	Prats de Molló	66150	Le Canigou	Céret	66230
Prats-de-Sournia	Prats de Sornillà	66151	La Vallée de l'Agly	Prades	66730
Prugnanes	Prunyanes	66152	La Vallée de l'Agly	Perpignan	66220
Prunet-et-Belpuig	Prunet i Bellpuig	66153	Le Canigou	Prades	66130
Puyvalador	Puigbalador	66154	Les Pyrénées catalanes	Prades	66210
Py	Pi	66155	Le Canigou	Prades	66360
Rabouillet	Rebollet	66156	La Vallée de l'Agly	Prades	66730
Railleu	Ralleu	66157	Les Pyrénées catalanes	Prades	66360
Rasiguères	Rasigueres	66158	La Vallée de l'Agly	Perpignan	66720
Réal	Ral	66159	Les Pyrénées catalanes	Prades	66210
Reynès	Reiners	66160	Le Canigou	Céret	66400
Ria-Sirach	Rià i Sirac	66161	Les Pyrénées catalanes	Prades	66500
Rigarda	Rigardà	66162	Le Canigou	Prades	66320
Rivesaltes	Ribesaltes	66164	La Vallée de l'Agly	Perpignan	66600
Rodès	Rodes	66165	Le Canigou	Prades	66320
Sahorre	Saorra	66166	Le Canigou	Prades	66360
Saillagouse	Sallagosa	66167	Les Pyrénées catalanes	Prades	66800
Saint-André	Sant Andreu de Sueda	66168	La Côte Vermeille	Céret	66690
Saint-Arnac	Centernac	66169	La Vallée de l'Agly	Perpignan	66220
Sainte-Colombe-de-la-Commanderie	Santa Colona de Tuïr	66170	Les Aspres	Perpignan	66300
Saint-Cyprien	Sant Cebrià de Rosselló	66171	La Côte Sableuse	Perpignan	66750
Saint-Estève	Sant Esteve del Monestir	66172	Le Ribéral	Perpignan	66240
Saint-Féliu-d'Amont	Sant Feliu d'Amunt	66173	La Vallée de la Têt	Perpignan	66170
Saint-Féliu-d'Avall	Sant Feliu d'Avall	66174	La Vallée de la Têt	Perpignan	66170
Saint-Génis-des-Fontaines	Sant Genís de Fontanes	66175	Vallespir-Albères	Céret	66740
Saint-Hippolyte	Sant Hipólit de la Salanca	66176	La Côte Salanquaise	Perpignan	66510
Saint-Jean-Lasseille	Sant Joan la Cella	66177	Les Aspres	Perpignan	66300
Saint-Jean-Pla-de-Corts	Sant Joan de Pladecorts	66178	Vallespir-Albères	Céret	66490
Saint-Laurent-de-Cerdans	Sant Llorenç de Cerdans	66179	Le Canigou	Céret	66260
Saint-Laurent-de-la-Salanque	Sant Llorenç de la Salanca	66180	La Côte Salanquaise	Perpignan	66250
Sainte-Léocadie	Santa Llocaia	66181	Les Pyrénées catalanes	Prades	66800
Sainte-Marie-la-Mer	Santa Maria la Mar	66182	Perpignan-2	Perpignan	66470
Saint-Marsal	Sant Marçal	66183	Le Canigou	Céret	66110
Saint-Martin-de-Fenouillet	Sant Martí de Fenollet	66184	La Vallée de l'Agly	Perpignan	66220
Saint-Michel-de-Llotes	Sant Miquel de Llotes	66185	Le Canigou	Prades	66130
Saint-Nazaire	Sant Nazari	66186	La Côte Sableuse	Perpignan	66570
Saint-Paul-de-Fenouillet	Sant Pau de Fenollet	66187	La Vallée de l'Agly	Perpignan	66220
Saint-Pierre-dels-Forcats	Sant Pere dels Forcats	66188	Les Pyrénées catalanes	Prades	66210
Saleilles	Salelles	66189	La Côte Sableuse	Perpignan	66280
Salses-le-Château	Salses	66190	La Vallée de l'Agly	Perpignan	66600
Sansa	Censà	66191	Les Pyrénées catalanes	Prades	66360
Sauto	Sautó	66192	Les Pyrénées catalanes	Prades	66210
Serdinya	Serdinyà	66193	Les Pyrénées catalanes	Prades	66360
Serralongue	Serrallonga	66194	Le Canigou	Céret	66230
Le Soler	El Soler	66195	La Vallée de la Têt	Perpignan	66270
Sorède	Sureda	66196	Vallespir-Albères	Céret	66690
Souanyas	Soanyes	66197	Les Pyrénées catalanes	Prades	66360
Sournia	Sournià	66198	La Vallée de l'Agly	Prades	66730
Taillet	Tellet	66199	Le Canigou	Céret	66400
Tarerach	Tarerac	66201	La Vallée de l'Agly	Prades	66320
Targasonne	Targasona	66202	Les Pyrénées catalanes	Prades	66120
Taulis	Teulís	66203	Le Canigou	Céret	66110
Taurinya	Taurinyà	66204	Le Canigou	Prades	66500
Tautavel	Talteüll	66205	La Vallée de l'Agly	Perpignan	66720
Le Tech	El Tec	66206	Le Canigou	Céret	66230
Terrats	Terrats	66207	Les Aspres	Perpignan	66300
Théza	Tesà	66208	La Plaine d'Illibéris	Perpignan	66200
Thuès-Entre-Valls	Toès	66209	Les Pyrénées catalanes	Prades	66360
Thuir	Tuïr	66210	Les Aspres	Perpignan	66300
Tordères	Torderes	66211	Les Aspres	Perpignan	66300
Torreilles	Torrelles de la Salanca	66212	La Côte Salanquaise	Perpignan	66440
Toulouges	Toluges	66213	Perpignan-6	Perpignan	66350
Tresserre	Tresserra	66214	Les Aspres	Perpignan	66300
Trévillach	Trevillac	66215	La Vallée de l'Agly	Prades	66130
Trilla	Trillà	66216	La Vallée de l'Agly	Prades	66220
Trouillas	Trullars	66217	Les Aspres	Perpignan	66300
Ur	Ur	66218	Les Pyrénées catalanes	Prades	66760
Urbanya	Orbanyà	66219	Les Pyrénées catalanes	Prades	66500
Valcebollère	Vallcebollera	66220	Les Pyrénées catalanes	Prades	66340
Valmanya	Valimanya	66221	Le Canigou	Prades	66320
Vernet-les-Bains	Vernet	66222	Le Canigou	Prades	66820
Villefranche-de-Conflent	Vilafranca de Conflent	66223	Les Pyrénées catalanes	Prades	66500
Villelongue-dels-Monts	Vilallonga dels Munts	66225	Vallespir-Albères	Céret	66740
Villelongue-de-la-Salanque	Vilallonga de la Salanca	66224	Perpignan-2	Perpignan	66410
Villemolaque	Vilamulaca	66226	Les Aspres	Perpignan	66300
Villeneuve-de-la-Raho	Vilanova de Raó	66227	La Plaine d'Illibéris	Perpignan	66180
Villeneuve-la-Rivière	Vilanova de la Ribera	66228	Le Ribéral	Perpignan	66610
Vinça	Vinça	66230	Le Canigou	Prades	66320
Vingrau	Vingrau	66231	La Vallée de l'Agly	Perpignan	66600
Vira	Virà	66232	La Vallée de l'Agly	Perpignan	66220
Vivès	Vivers	66233	Vallespir-Albères	Céret	66490
Le Vivier	El Viver	66234	La Vallée de l'Agly	Prades	66730

== Former communes and names ==
The following names of communes are no longer in use, either because the commune has been absorbed into another commune or because it has changed name.

- Amélie-les-Bains → Amélie-les-Bains-Palalda (1942)
- Angoustrine → Angoustrine-Villeneuve-des-Escaldes (1973)
- Anills → Ponteilla (< 1800)
- Argelès → Argelès-sur-Mer (1840)
- Arles-les-Bains → Amélie-les-Bains (1840) → Amélie-les-Bains-Palalda (1942)
- Ayguatébia → Ayguatébia-Talau (1983)
- Aytua → Escaro (1822)
- Bajande → Estavar (1822)
- Belloc → Villefranche (< 1800) → Villefranche-de-Conflent (1893)
- Belpuig → Prunet-et-Belpuig (< 1800)
- Bessegarde → L'Écluse (< 1800) → Les Cluses (1984)
- Boiça → Alénya (< 1800)
- Cabanes → Saint-Génis (< 1800) → Saint-Génis-des-Fontaines (1968)
- Caldegas → Bourg-Madame (1973)
- Canet → Canet-en-Roussillon-Saint-Nazaire (1972) → Canet-en-Roussillon (1983)
- Canet-en-Roussillon-Saint-Nazaire → Canet-en-Roussillon and Saint-Nazaire (1983)
- Caudiès → Caudiès-de-Conflent (1983)
- Caudiès → Caudiès-de-Fenouillèdes (1898)
- Château-Roussillon → Perpignan (< 1800)
- Comes → Eus (1828)
- Corneilla → Corneilla-de-Conflent (1933)
- Cortals → La Llagonne (1822)
- L'Écluse → Les Cluses (1984)
- En → Nyer (1822)
- Espira → Espira-de-Conflent (1933)
- Évol → Olette (1827)
- Fetges → Sauto (< 1800)
- Flassa → Jujols (< 1800)
- Fontanils → Arles-sur-Tech (1823)
- Garrieux → Salses (< 1800)
- Garrius → Salses (< 1800)
- Hix → Bourg-Madame (1815)
- Les Horts → Serdinya (1822)
- Las Illas → Maureillas-las-Illas (1972)
- Ille → Ille-sur-Têt (1953)
- Laroque → Laroque-des-Albères (1953)
- Lavaill → Sorède (1822)
- Levilar → Villelongue-dels-Monts (1803)
- Llar → Canaveilles (1821)
- Marcevol → Arboussols (1822)
- Marians → Souanyas (1822)
- Maureillas → Maureillas-las-Illas (1972)
- Molitg → Molitg-les-Bains (1970)
- Montalba → Montalba-d'Amélie (1933) → Amélie-les-Bains-Palalda (1963)
- Montalba → Montalba-le-Château (1933)
- Montalba-d'Amélie → Amélie-les-Bains-Palalda (1963)
- Montesquieu → Montesquieu-des-Albères (1992)
- Nidolère → Tresserre (< 1800)
- Nyls → Ponteilla (< 1800)
- Odeillo → Odeillo-Via (1900) → Font-Romeu-Odeillo-Via (1957)
- Odeillo-Via → Font-Romeu-Odeillo-Via (1957)
- Opoul → Opoul-Périllos (1972)
- Palalda → Amélie-les-Bains-Palalda (1942)
- Palau → Palau-de-Cerdagne (1936)
- Palol → Céret (1823)
- Passa-Llauro-Tordères → Llauro, Passa and Tordères (1989)
- La Pave → Argelès (< 1800) → Argelès-sur-Mer (1840)
- La Perche → La Cabanasse (< 1800)
- Perillos → Opoul-Périllos (1972)
- Pézilla → Pézilla-de-Conflent (1933)
- Porté → Porté-Puymorens (1954)
- Prats → Prats-de-Sournia (1933)
- Prats → Prats-Saint-Thomas (< 1800) → Fontpédrouse (1822)
- Prats-de-Mollo → Prats-de-Mollo-la-Preste (1956)
- Prats-Saint-Thomas → Fontpédrouse (1822)
- Prunet → Prunet-et-Belpuig (< 1800)
- Ria → Ria-Sirach-Urbanya (1973)
- Ria-Sirach-Urbanya → Ria-Sirach and Urbanya (1983)
- Riunogues → Maureillas-las-Illas (1972)
- Ro → Saillagouse (1822)
- Rohet → Llo (< 1800)
- Sahorle → Vinça (< 1800)
- Saillagouse-Llo → Llo and Saillagouse (1984)
- Saint-Génis → Saint-Génis-des-Fontaines (1968)
- Saint-Martin → Maureillas (1823) → Maureillas-las-Illas (1972)
- Saint-Paul → Saint-Paul-de-Fenouillet (1953)
- Saint-Thomas → Prats-Saint-Thomas (< 1800) → Fontpédrouse (1822)
- Salses → Salses-le-Château (1986)
- Selva → Las Illas (1823) → Maureillas-las-Illas (1972)
- Serrabonne → Boule-d'Amont (1822)
- Sirach → Ria (1822) → Ria-Sirach-Urbanya (1973) → Ria-Sirach (1983)
- Talau → Ayguatébia-Talau (1983)
- Taxo-d'Amont → Saint-André (< 1800)
- Taxo-d'Avall → Argelès (< 1800) → Argelès-sur-Mer (1840)
- Thuès-Dellar → Thuès-Entre-Valls (1822)
- Touren → Sahorre (1822)
- Vedrinyans → Saillagouse (1822)
- Vernet → Vernet-les-Bains (1953)
- Via → Odeillo (1822)→ Odeillo-Via (1900) → Font-Romeu-Odeillo-Via (1957)
- Villefranche → Villefranche-de-Conflent (1893)
- Villeneuve-des-Escaldes → Angoustrine-Villeneuve-des-Escaldes (1973)
- Villerach → Clara (1822)
- Villeroge → Coustouges (< 1800)
