= List of intercommunalities of the Pyrénées-Orientales department =

Since 1 January 2017, the Pyrénées-Orientales department has had twelve public establishments for intercommunal cooperation (EPCI), each with their administrative seats being located in the department and having their own tax systems.

== Intercommunalities with their own taxation ==
=== Current ===
List of public establishments for intercommunal cooperation in the Pyrénées-Orientales department (as of 2022)
Legal form	Name	SIREN number	Date of creation	Number of communes	Population (2018/2019)	Area (km^{2})	Density (per km^{2})	Seat	President	Ref.
Communauté urbaine	Perpignan Méditerranée Métropole	200027183	31 December 2010	36	270,200	616.70	438	Perpignan	Robert Vila	
Communauté de communes	CC des Albères, de la Côte Vermeille et de l'Illibéris	200043602	1 January 2014	15	55,610	292.50	190	Argelès-sur-Mer	Antoine Parra	
Communauté de communes	CC Sud Roussillon	246600282	31 December 1992	6	23,575	40.70	579	Saint-Cyprien	Thierry Del Poso	
Communauté de communes	CC Corbières Salanque Méditerranée	200070365	1 January 2017	21 (including 18 in Pyrénées-Orientales)	22,196	549.20	40	Claira	Jean-Jacques Lopez	
Communauté de communes	CC Conflent-Canigó	200049211	1 January 2015	45	20,466	785.90	26	Prades	Jean-Louis Jallat	
Communauté de communes	CC du Vallespir	246600373	31 December 1996	10	20,468	183.90	111	Céret	Alain Torrent	
Communauté de communes	CC des Aspres	246600449	31 December 1997	19	21,708	231.50	94	Thuir	René Olive	
Communauté de communes	CC Roussillon Conflent	246600415	31 December 1996	16	18,398	233.40	79	Ille-sur-Têt	Robert Olive	
Communauté de communes	CC du Haut Vallespir	246600548	31 December 2004	14	9,677	465.50	21	Arles-sur-Tech	René Bantoure	
Communauté de communes	CC Pyrénées Cerdagne	246600399	31 December 1996	19	8,635	441.40	20	Saillagouse	Georges Armengol	
Communauté de communes	CC Pyrénées catalanes	246600464	31 December 1997	19	5,974	352.70	17	La Llagonne	Jean-Louis Démelin	
Communauté de communes	CC Agly-Fenouillèdes	246600423	31 December 1996	24	6,412	368.10	17	Saint-Paul-de-Fenouillet	Charles Chivilo	

=== Former structures for intercommunal cooperation ===
List of former structures for intercommunal cooperations in the Pyrénées-Orientales department
Legal form	Name	Number of communes	Seat	Date of creation	Date of disbandment
Communauté de communes	CC des Albères	8	Argelès-sur-Mer	28 December 2001	1 January 2007
Communauté de communes	CC de la Côte Vermeille	4	Port-Vendres	31 October 2001	1 January 2007
Communauté de communes	CC du Rivesaltais-Agly-Manadeil	9	Rivesaltes	22 December 1995	1 January 2011
Communauté de communes	CC Canigou - Val Cady	2	Vernet-les-Bains	24 December 2002	1 January 2014
Communauté de communes	CC du secteur d'Illibérus	2	Bages	31 December 1997	1 January 2014
Communauté de communes	CC Vinça-Canigou	11	Vinça	24 December 1997	1 January 2015
Communauté de communes	CC du Conflent	35	Prades	1 January 2009	1 January 2015

== Historical evolution of intercommunal structures ==
=== In 2007 ===
- 1 January 2007: Creation of the communauté de communes des Albères et de la Côte Vermeille from the communauté de communes des Albères and the communauté de communes de la Côte Vermeille.

=== In 2011 ===
- 1 January 2011: Disbandment of the communauté de communes du Rivesaltais-Agly-Manadeil into the communauté d'agglomération Perpignan Méditerranée.

=== In 2014 ===
- 1 January 2014: Disbandment of the communauté de communes Canigou - Val Cady into the communauté de communes du Conflent.
- 1 January 2014: Disbandment of the communauté de communes du secteur d'Illibéris into the communauté de communes des Albères et de la Côte Vermeille.

=== In 2015 ===
- 1 January 2015: Creation of the communauté de communes Conflent Canigó from the communauté de communes Vinça Canigou, communauté de communes du Conflent, and the commune of Marquixanes.

=== In 2016 ===
- The communauté d'agglomération Perpignan Méditerranée becomes a communauté urbaine and changes its name to become the communauté urbaine Perpignan Méditerranée Métropole.
- The communauté de communes Capcir Haut-Conflent changes its name to become the communauté de communes Pyrénées catalanes.
