= Château de Belpuig =

Ruined castle in Northern Catalonia, Occitania, France

Coordinates: 42°33′44″N 2°37′17″E

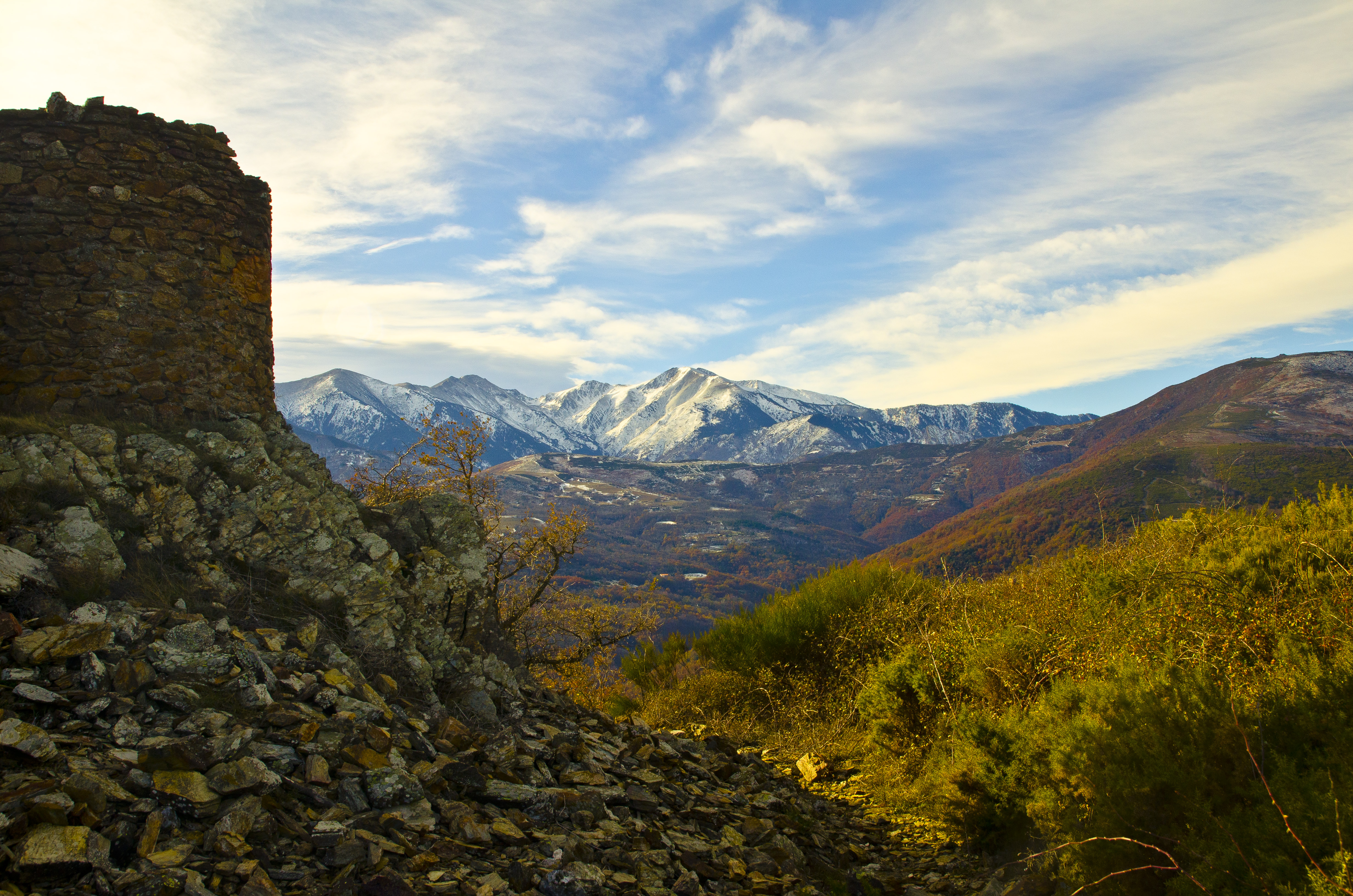
Belpuig Castle and the Canigou mountain

The Château de Belpuig (Catalan: Castell de Bellpuig) is a ruined castle in the commune of Prunet-et-Belpuig in the Pyrénées-Orientales département of France.

The castle was the seat of the Viscounts of Castelnou who reigned over the Vallespir region from the 10th to the 13th centuries.

The castle, a 15-minute walk from the village, occupies a strategic position on a rocky spur overlooking the surrounding countryside. The extensive panorama takes in the mountain ranges of Canigó, the Albères, the Corbières Massif and the coast of Languedoc and Roussillon.

== See also ==
- List of castles in France
