= Urbanya =

Urbanya Orbanyà
- Commune
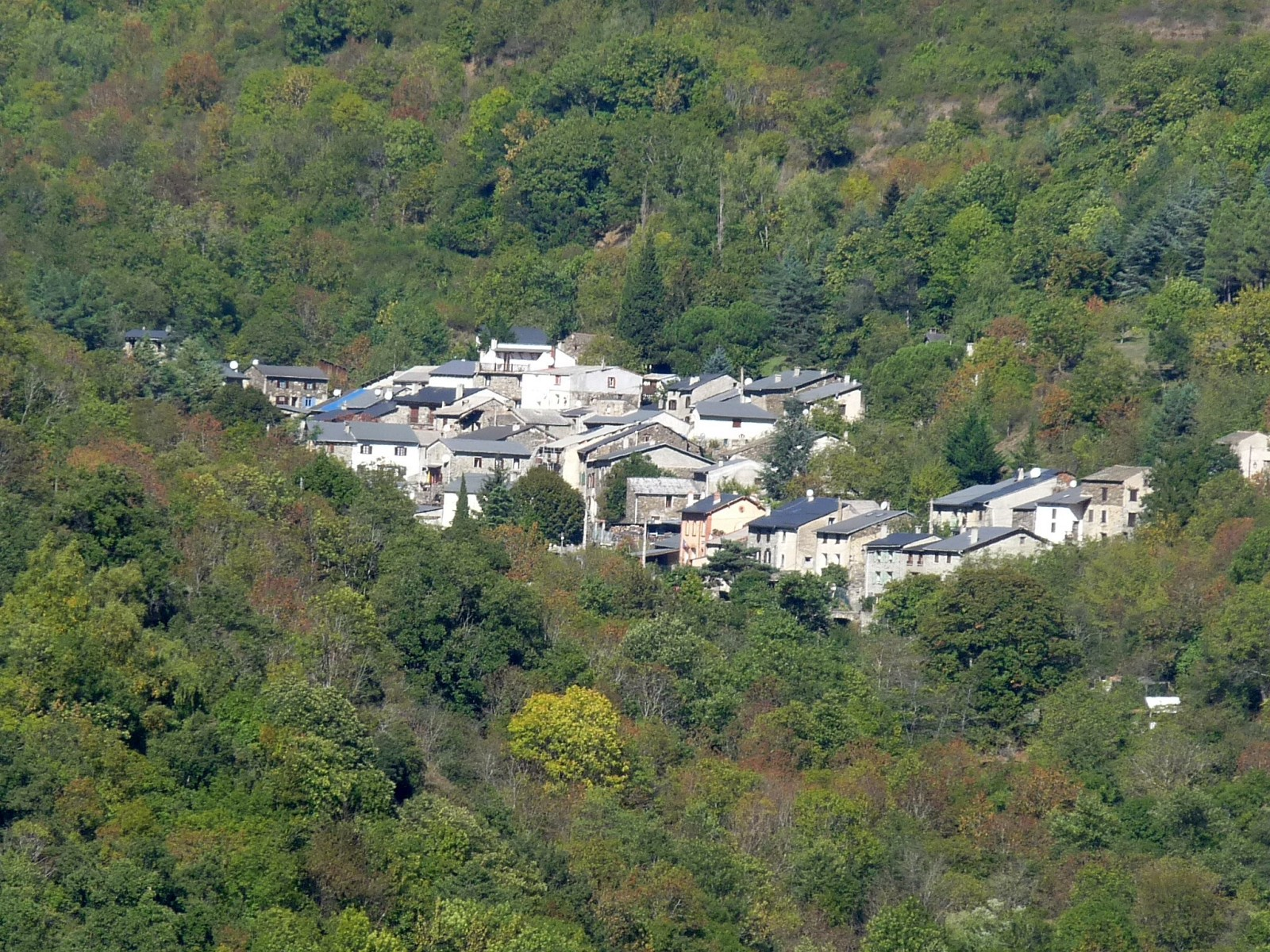
- Urbanya at the bottom of the valley
- Location of Urbanya
- Location within France Location within Occitanie
- Coordinates: 42°38′23″N 2°18′20″E
- Country: France
- Region: Occitania
- Department: Pyrénées-Orientales
- Arrondissement: Prades
- Canton: Les Pyrénées catalanes

Government
  - Mayor (2020–2026): Jean Servat
- Area^{1}: 14.40 km^{2} (5.56 sq mi)
- Elevation: 400 m (1,300 ft)
- Highest elevation: 1,765 m (5,791 ft)
- Lowest elevation: 720 m (2,360 ft)
- Population (2023): 45
  - Density: 3.1/km^{2} (8.1/sq mi)
- Time zone: UTC+01:00 (CET)
  - Summer (DST): UTC+02:00 (CEST)
- INSEE/Postal code: 66219 /66500
- ^{1} French Land Register data, which excludes lakes, ponds, glaciers > 1 km^{2} (0.386 sq mi or 247 acres) and river estuaries.

Urbanya (French pronunciation: [yʁbaɲa]; Catalan: Orbanyà) is a commune in the Pyrénées-Orientales department in southern France.

== Geography ==
Urbanya is located in the canton of Les Pyrénées catalanes and in the arrondissement of Prades.

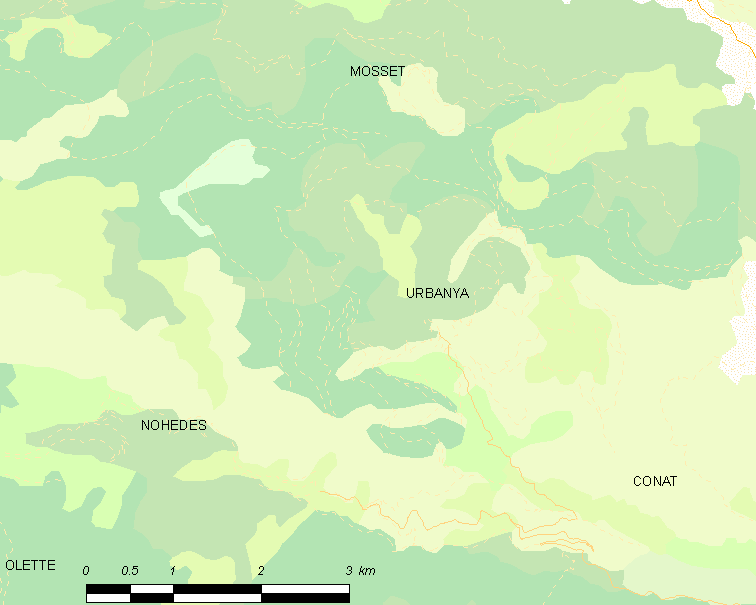
Map of Urbanya and its surrounding communes

== History ==
Urbanya is mentioned for the first time on 16 June 1186, as being owned by the lord of Conat, on an act signed by Guillem-Bernard de Paracols, husband of Blanche de Conat.

In September 1907, a rain and hailstorm falls on Urbanya, damaging and sometimes destroying the roads and bridges, as well with several houses.

== Population ==
Historical population
Year	Pop.	±% p.a.
1968	14	—
1975	28	+10.41%
1982	26	−1.05%
1990	33	+3.02%
1999	28	−1.81%
2007	57	+9.29%
2012	9	−30.87%
2017	55	+43.62%
2023	45	−3.29%
Source: INSEE

== See also ==
- Communes of the Pyrénées-Orientales department
