= Llo =

- Commune
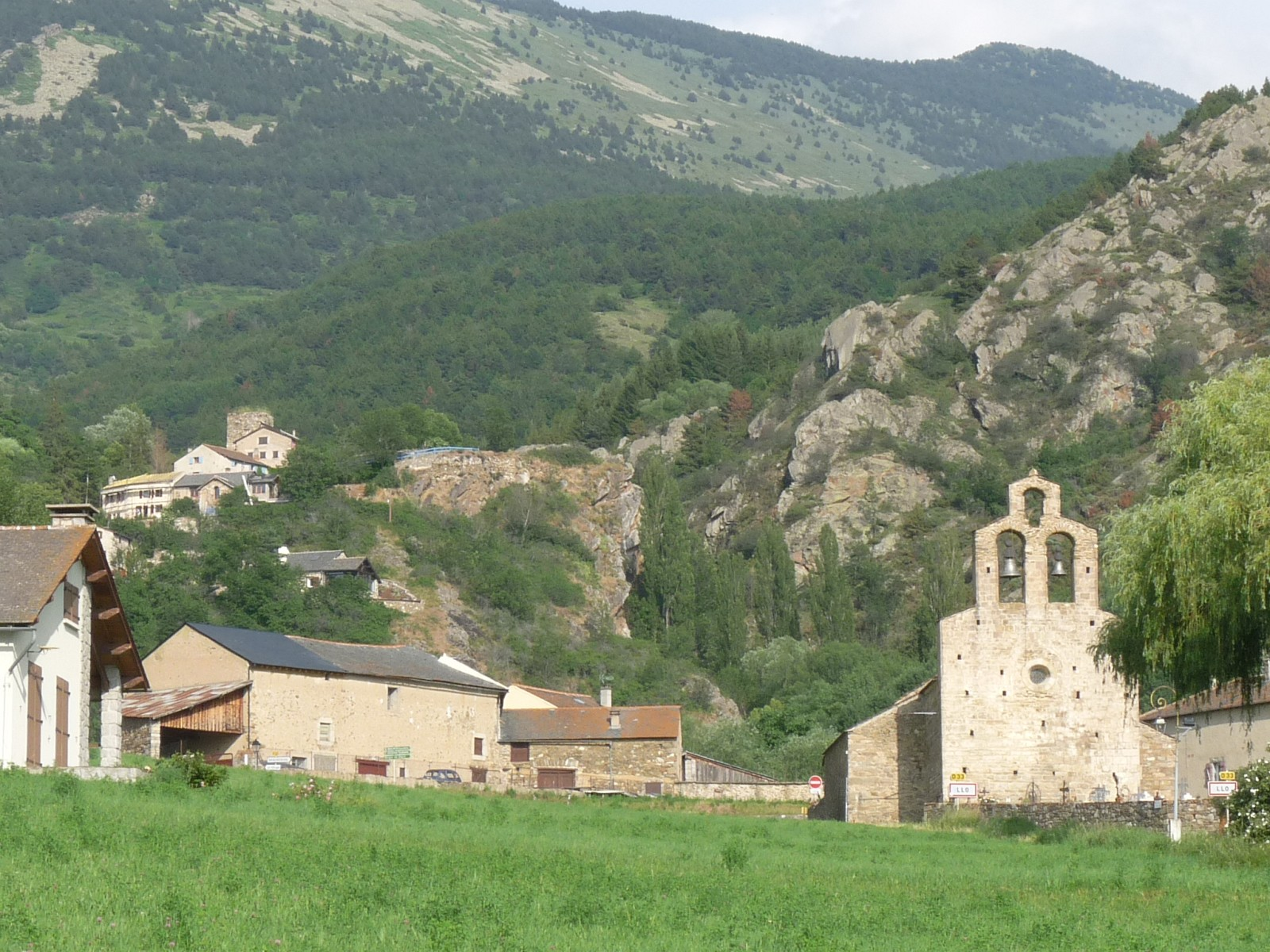
- View of Llo

- Coat of arms
- Location of Llo
- Location within France Location within Occitanie
- Coordinates: 42°27′21″N 2°03′52″E
- Country: France
- Region: Occitania
- Department: Pyrénées-Orientales
- Arrondissement: Prades
- Canton: Les Pyrénées catalanes

Government
  - Mayor (2020–2026): Jean-Marie Mas
- Area^{1}: 28.44 km^{2} (10.98 sq mi)
- Elevation: 1,300 m (4,300 ft)
- Highest elevation: 2,840 m (9,320 ft)
- Lowest elevation: 1,319 m (4,327 ft)
- Population (2023): 153
  - Density: 5.38/km^{2} (13.9/sq mi)
- Time zone: UTC+01:00 (CET)
  - Summer (DST): UTC+02:00 (CEST)
- INSEE/Postal code: 66100 /66800
- ^{1} French Land Register data, which excludes lakes, ponds, glaciers > 1 km^{2} (0.386 sq mi or 247 acres) and river estuaries.

Llo (French pronunciation: [jo]; Catalan pronunciation: [ˈʎo]) is a commune in the Pyrénées-Orientales department in southern France.

== Geography ==
Llo is located in the canton of Les Pyrénées catalanes and in the arrondissement of Prades.

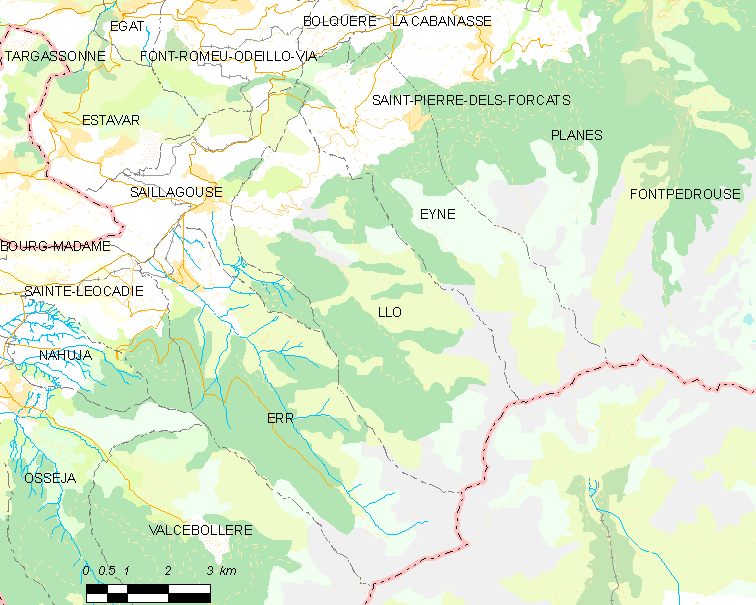
Map of Llo and its surrounding communes

== Population ==
Historical population
Year	Pop.	±% p.a.
1968	86	—
1975	108	+3.31%
1982	116	+1.03%
1990	131	+1.53%
1999	133	+0.17%
2007	150	+1.51%
2012	162	+1.55%
2017	172	+1.21%
2023	153	−1.93%
Source: INSEE

== See also ==
- Communes of the Pyrénées-Orientales department
