= Clara-Villerach =

Clara-Villerach Clarà i Villerac
- Commune
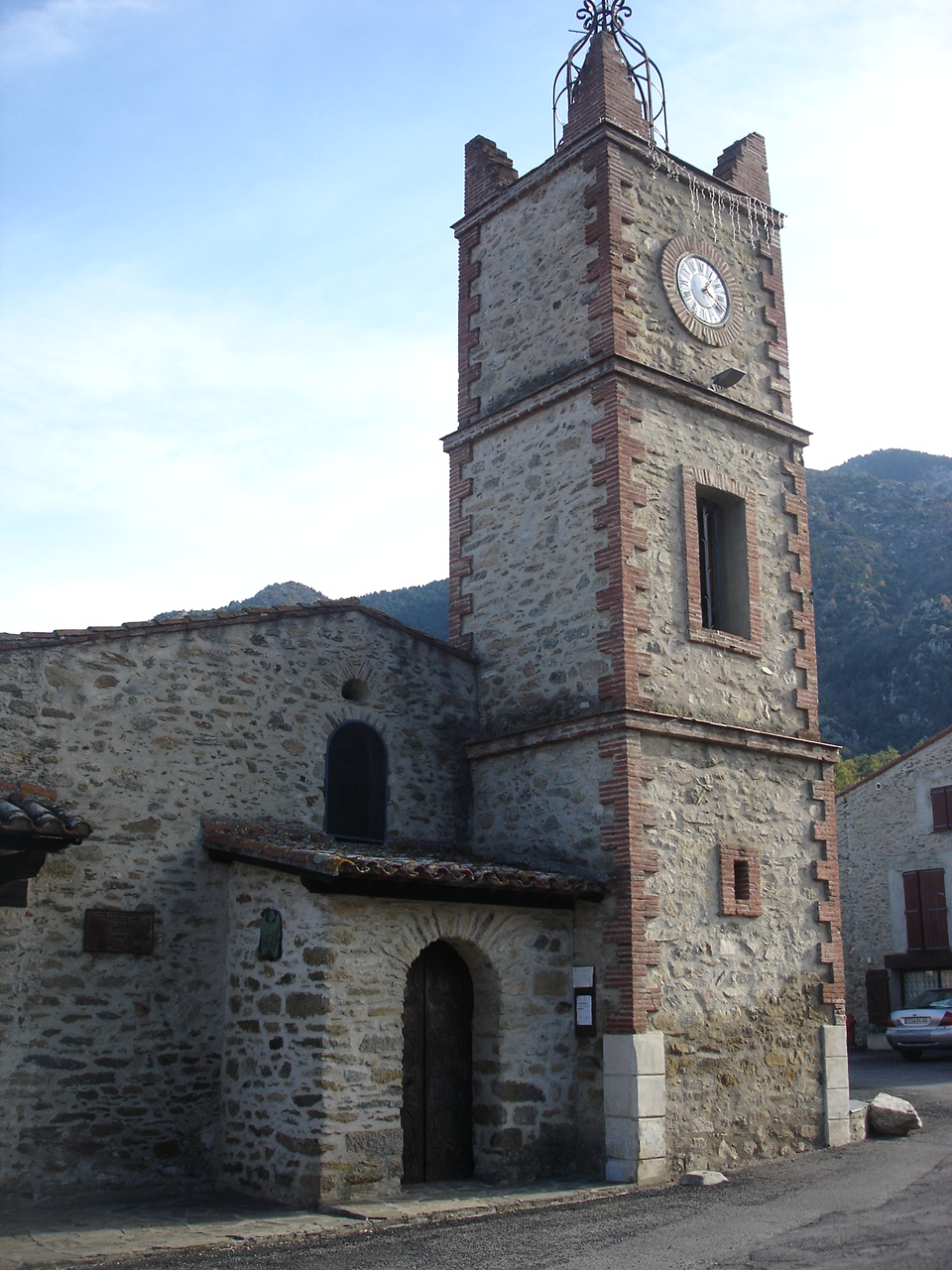
- The church of Saint Martin, in Clara
- Location of Clara-Villerach
- Location within France Location within Occitanie
- Coordinates: 42°35′10″N 2°26′37″E
- Country: France
- Region: Occitania
- Department: Pyrénées-Orientales
- Arrondissement: Prades
- Canton: Les Pyrénées catalanes

Government
  - Mayor (2020–2026): Patrick Marcel
- Area^{1}: 8.70 km^{2} (3.36 sq mi)
- Elevation: 668 m (2,192 ft)
- Highest elevation: 1,880 m (6,170 ft)
- Lowest elevation: 380 m (1,250 ft)
- Population (2023): 265
  - Density: 30.5/km^{2} (78.9/sq mi)
- Time zone: UTC+01:00 (CET)
  - Summer (DST): UTC+02:00 (CEST)
- INSEE/Postal code: 66051 /66500
- ^{1} French Land Register data, which excludes lakes, ponds, glaciers > 1 km^{2} (0.386 sq mi or 247 acres) and river estuaries.

Clara-Villerach (French pronunciation: [klaʁa vijʁak]; Catalan: Clarà i Villerac) is a commune in the Pyrénées-Orientales department in southern France.

== Geography ==
Clara-Villerach is located in the canton of Les Pyrénées catalanes and in the arrondissement of Prades.

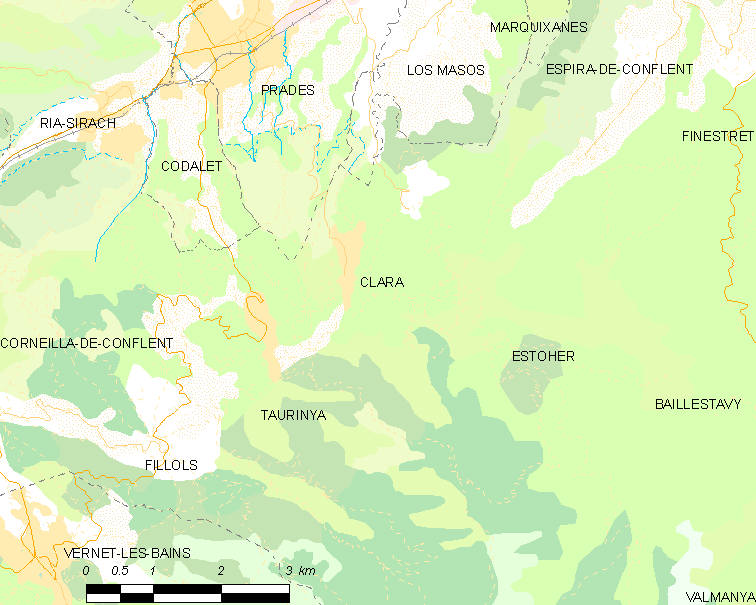
Map of Clara and its surrounding communes

== Toponymy ==
On 7 February 2017 the town's name changed from Clara to Clara-Villerach.

== Population ==
Historical population
Year	Pop.	±% p.a.
1968	109	—
1975	106	−0.40%
1982	119	+1.67%
1990	153	+3.19%
1999	161	+0.57%
2007	241	+5.17%
2012	243	+0.17%
2017	256	+1.05%
2023	265	+0.58%
Source: INSEE

== See also ==
- Communes of the Pyrénées-Orientales department
