= Sahorre =

Sahorre Saorra
- Commune
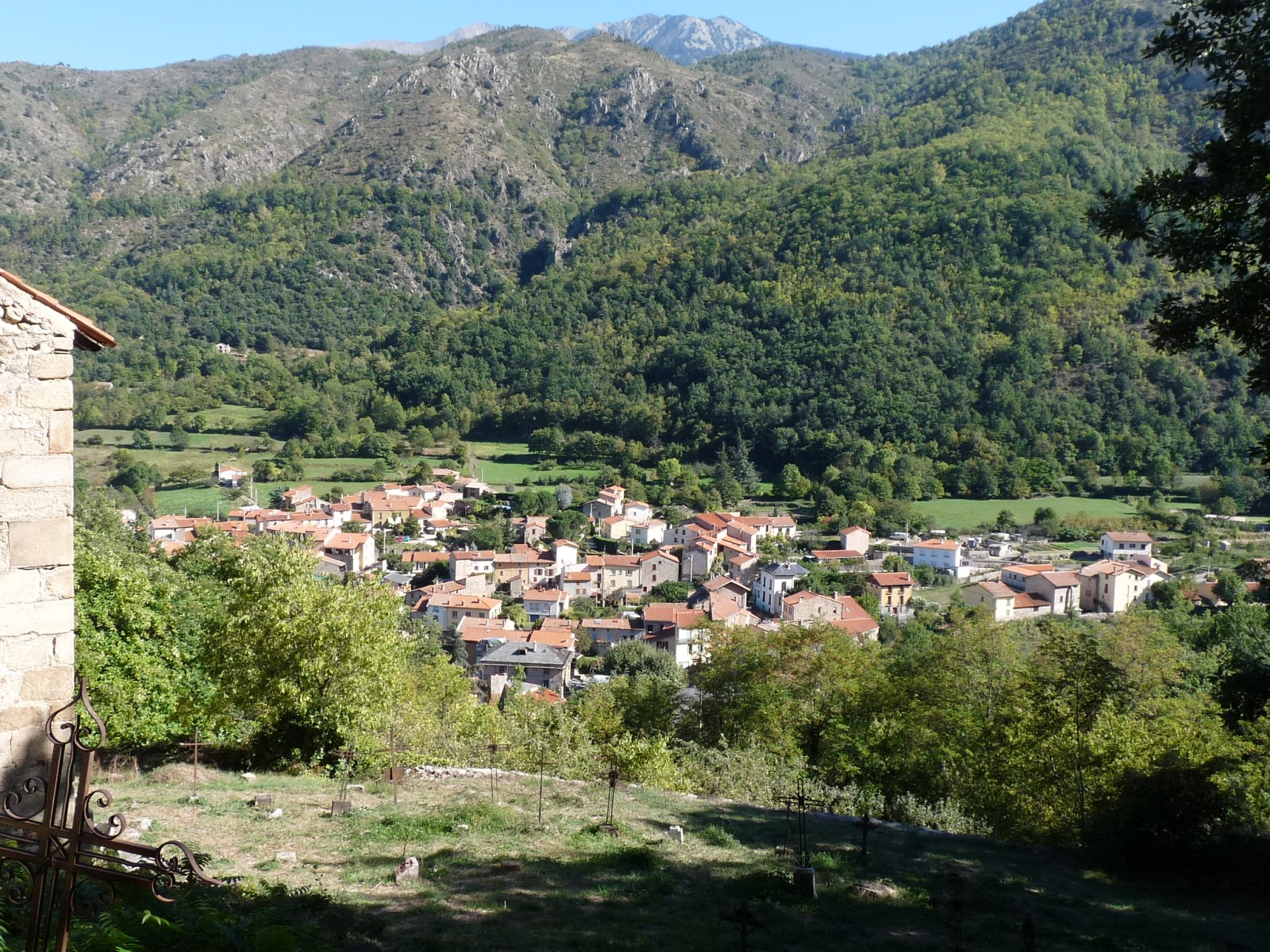
- View from the church of Saint-Etienne, to Sahorre and the Canigou

- Coat of arms
- Location of Sahorre
- Location within France Location within Occitanie
- Coordinates: 42°32′00″N 2°21′45″E
- Country: France
- Region: Occitania
- Department: Pyrénées-Orientales
- Arrondissement: Prades
- Canton: Le Canigou

Government
  - Mayor (2020–2026): Olivier Gravas
- Area^{1}: 14.88 km^{2} (5.75 sq mi)
- Elevation: 675 m (2,215 ft)
- Highest elevation: 2,082 m (6,831 ft)
- Lowest elevation: 599 m (1,965 ft)
- Population (2023): 401
  - Density: 26.9/km^{2} (69.8/sq mi)
- Time zone: UTC+01:00 (CET)
  - Summer (DST): UTC+02:00 (CEST)
- INSEE/Postal code: 66166 /66360
- ^{1} French Land Register data, which excludes lakes, ponds, glaciers > 1 km^{2} (0.386 sq mi or 247 acres) and river estuaries.

Sahorre (French pronunciation: [sa.ɔʁ]; Catalan: Saorra) is a commune in the Pyrénées-Orientales department in southern France.

== Geography ==
Sahorre is in the canton of Le Canigou and in the arrondissement of Prades.

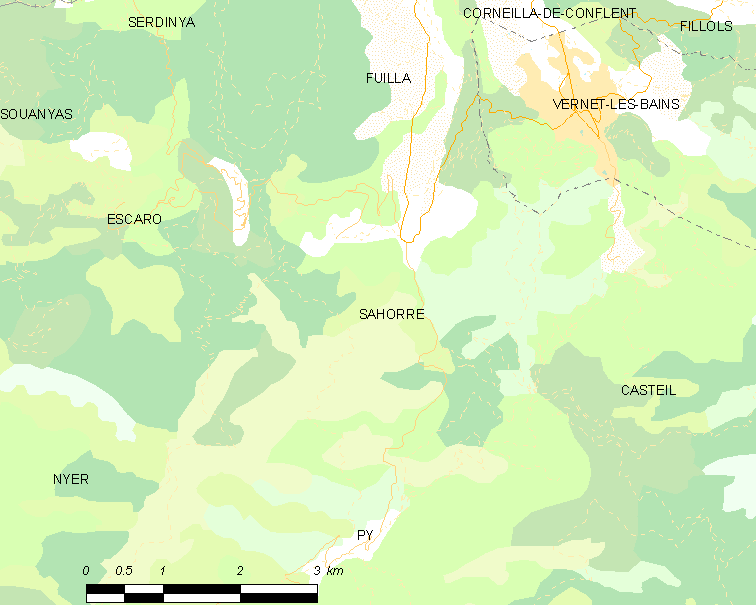
Map of Sahorre and its surrounding communes

== Population ==
Historical population
| Year | Pop. | ±% p.a. |
|---|---|---|
| 1968 | 445 | — |
| 1975 | 370 | −2.60% |
| 1982 | 359 | −0.43% |
| 1990 | 333 | −0.94% |
| 1999 | 347 | +0.46% |
| 2007 | 361 | +0.50% |
| 2012 | 364 | +0.17% |
| 2017 | 382 | +0.97% |
| 2023 | 401 | +0.81% |
Source: INSEE

== See also ==
- Communes of the Pyrénées-Orientales department
