= Rabouillet =

Rabouillet Rebolhet
- Commune
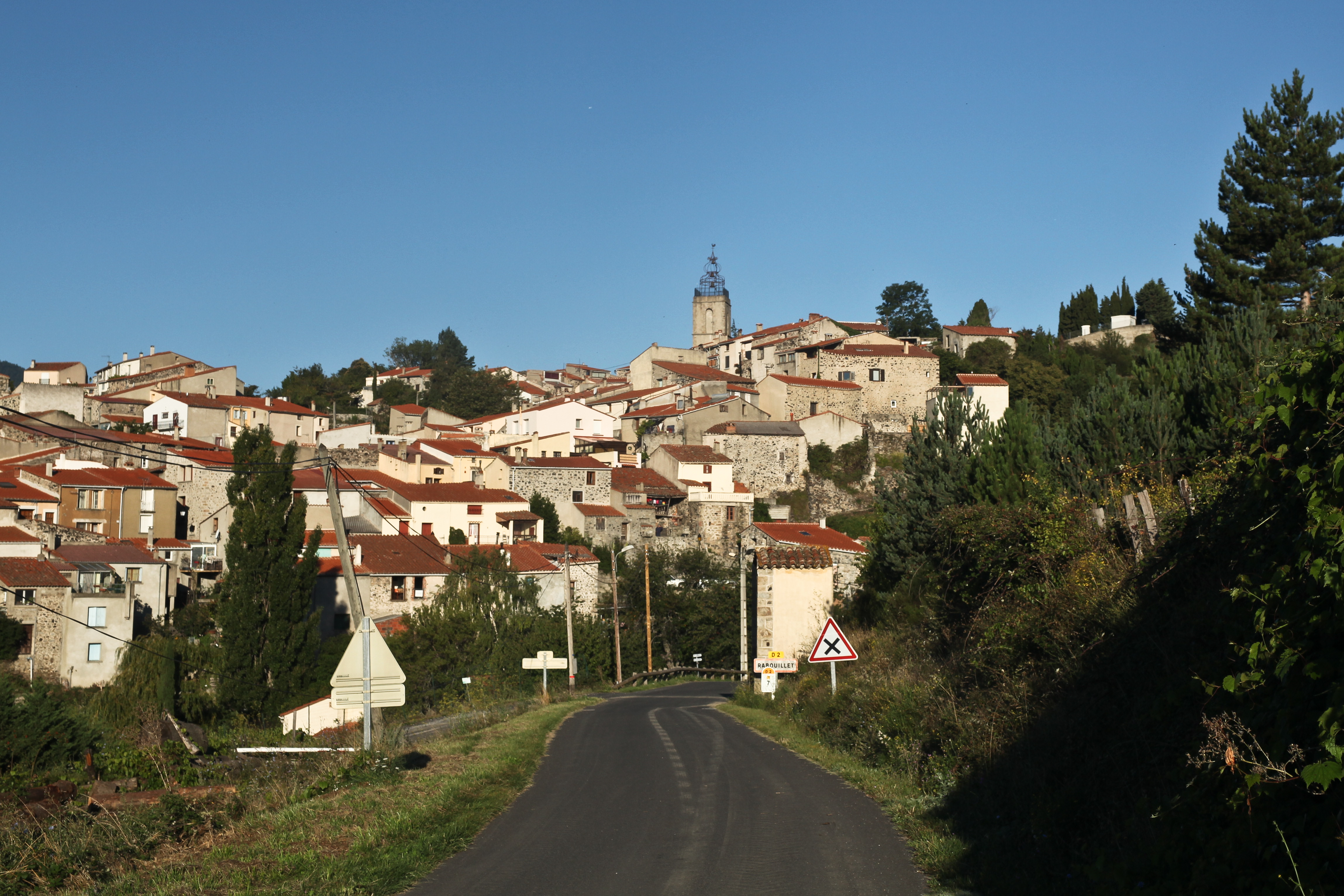
- A general view of the village of Rabouillet

- Coat of arms
- Location of Rabouillet
- Location within France Location within Occitanie
- Coordinates: 42°43′56″N 2°23′25″E
- Country: France
- Region: Occitania
- Department: Pyrénées-Orientales
- Arrondissement: Prades
- Canton: La Vallée de l'Agly
- Intercommunality: Agly Fenouillèdes

Government
  - Mayor (2020–2026): Auguste Blanc
- Area^{1}: 19.21 km^{2} (7.42 sq mi)
- Elevation: 658 m (2,159 ft)
- Highest elevation: 1,529 m (5,016 ft)
- Lowest elevation: 600 m (2,000 ft)
- Population (2023): 85
  - Density: 4.4/km^{2} (11/sq mi)
- Time zone: UTC+01:00 (CET)
  - Summer (DST): UTC+02:00 (CEST)
- INSEE/Postal code: 66156 /66730
- ^{1} French Land Register data, which excludes lakes, ponds, glaciers > 1 km^{2} (0.386 sq mi or 247 acres) and river estuaries.

Rabouillet (French pronunciation: [ʁabujɛ]; Occitan: Rebolhet) is a commune in the Pyrénées-Orientales department in southern France.

== Geography ==
Rabouillet is in the canton of La Vallée de l'Agly and in the arrondissement of Prades.

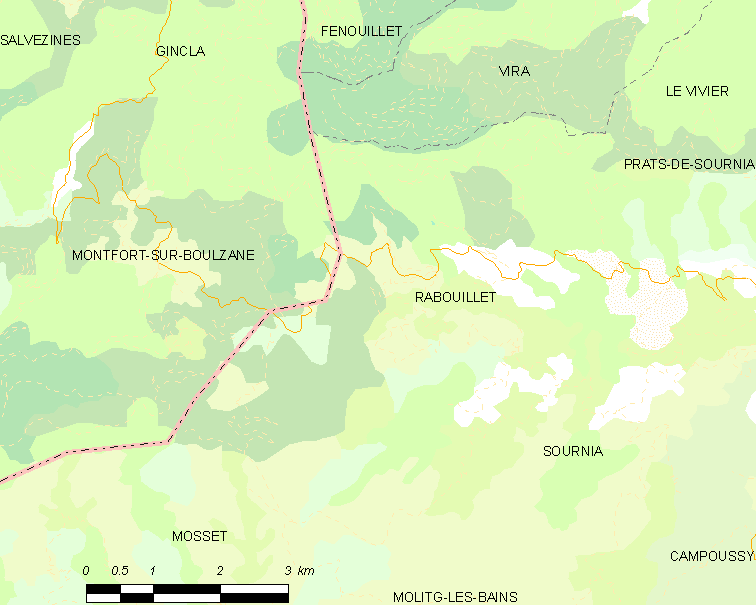
Map of Rabouillet and its surrounding communes

== Population ==
Historical population
Year	Pop.	±% p.a.
1968	139	—
1975	127	−1.28%
1982	106	−2.55%
1990	101	−0.60%
1999	85	−1.90%
2007	105	+2.68%
2012	111	+1.12%
2017	103	−1.48%
2023	85	−3.15%
Source: INSEE

== See also ==
- Communes of the Pyrénées-Orientales department
