= Rigarda =

Rigarda Rigardà
- Commune
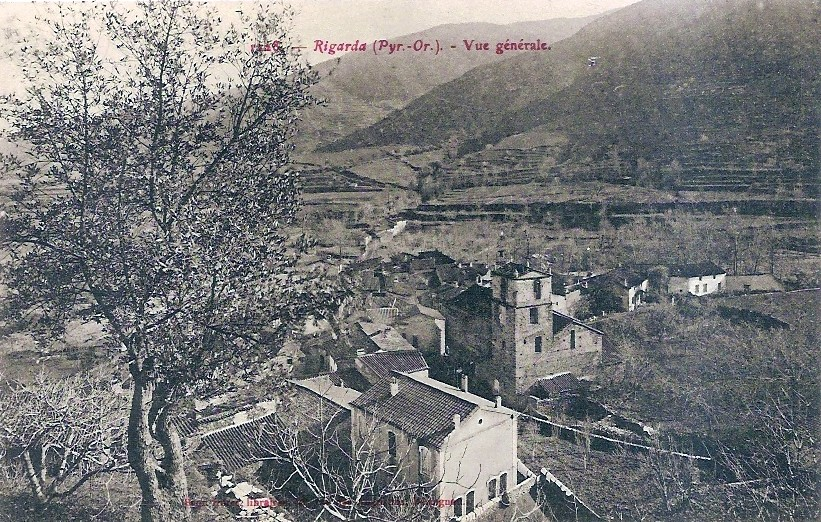
- Location of Rigarda
- Location within France Location within Occitanie
- Coordinates: 42°37′33″N 2°32′05″E
- Country: France
- Region: Occitania
- Department: Pyrénées-Orientales
- Arrondissement: Prades
- Canton: Le Canigou

Government
  - Mayor (2020–2026): André Josse
- Area^{1}: 3.60 km^{2} (1.39 sq mi)
- Elevation: 298 m (978 ft)
- Highest elevation: 650 m (2,130 ft)
- Lowest elevation: 250 m (820 ft)
- Population (2023): 698
  - Density: 194/km^{2} (502/sq mi)
- Time zone: UTC+01:00 (CET)
  - Summer (DST): UTC+02:00 (CEST)
- INSEE/Postal code: 66162 /66320
- ^{1} French Land Register data, which excludes lakes, ponds, glaciers > 1 km^{2} (0.386 sq mi or 247 acres) and river estuaries.

Rigarda (French pronunciation: [ʁiɡaʁda]; Catalan: Rigardà) is a commune in the Pyrénées-Orientales department in southern France.

== Geography ==
Rigarda is in the canton of Le Canigou and in the arrondissement of Prades.

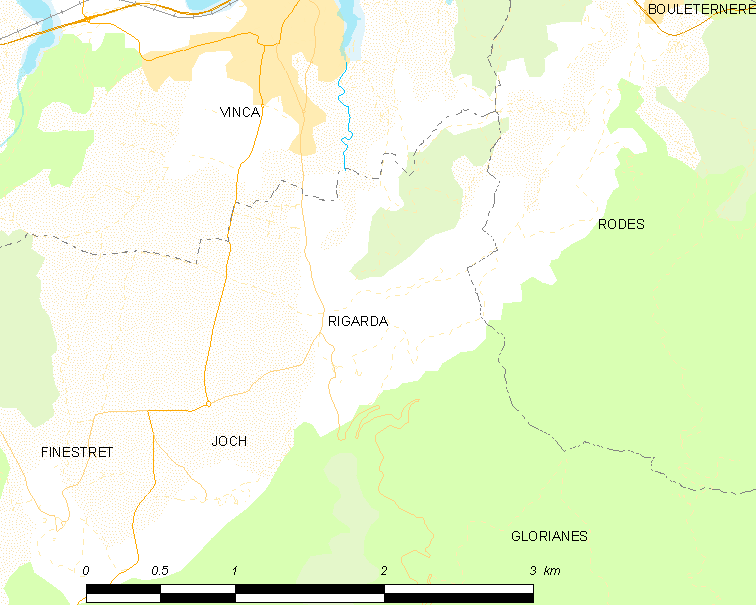
Map of Rigarda and its surrounding communes

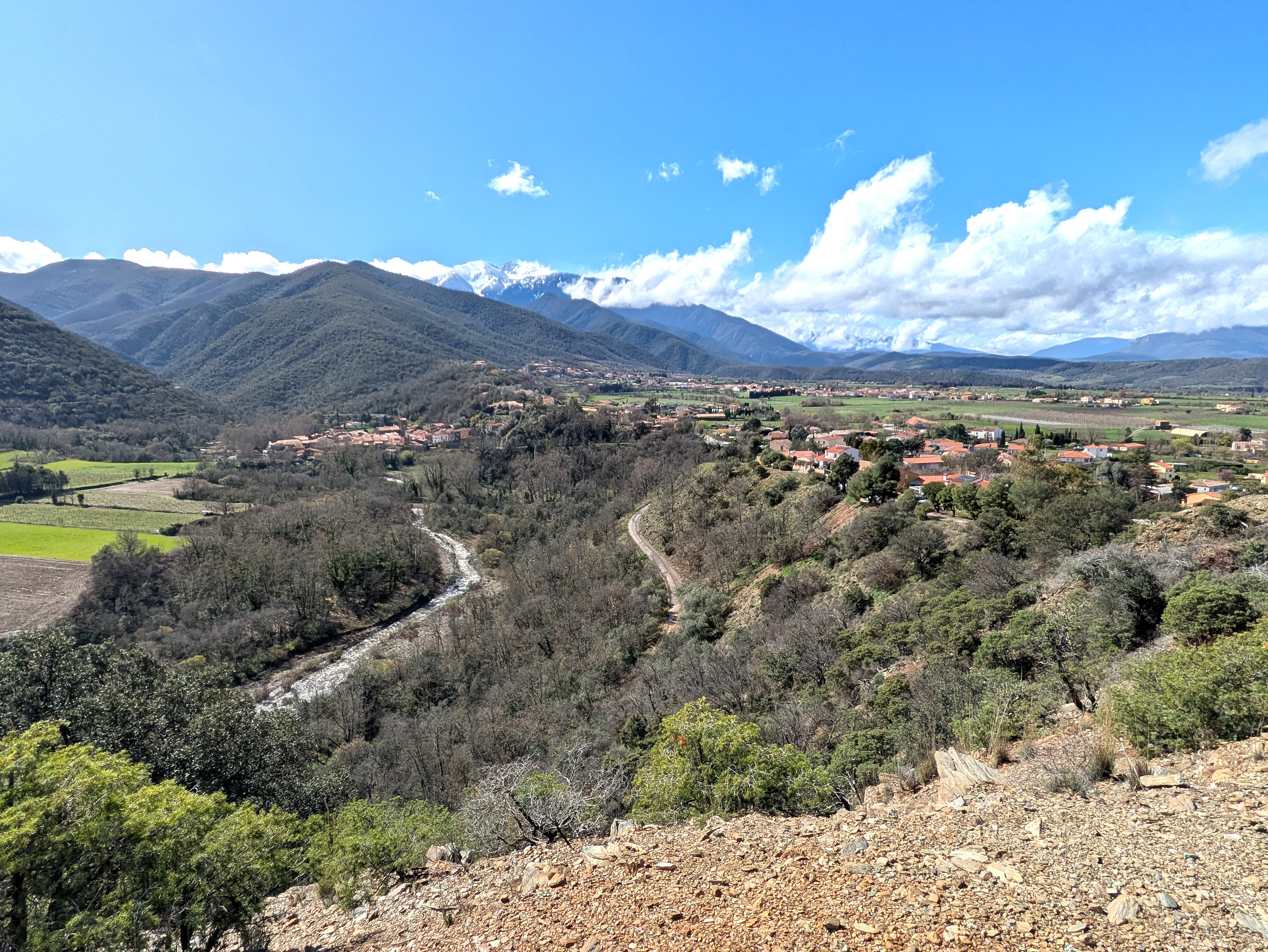
The village today

== Population ==
Historical population
| Year | Pop. | ±% p.a. |
|---|---|---|
| 1968 | 137 | — |
| 1975 | 135 | −0.21% |
| 1982 | 144 | +0.93% |
| 1990 | 164 | +1.64% |
| 1999 | 219 | +3.27% |
| 2007 | 320 | +4.85% |
| 2012 | 577 | +12.51% |
| 2017 | 641 | +2.13% |
| 2023 | 698 | +1.43% |
Source: INSEE

== See also ==
- Communes of the Pyrénées-Orientales department
