= Saint-André, Pyrénées-Orientales =

Saint-André Sant Andreu de Sureda
- Commune
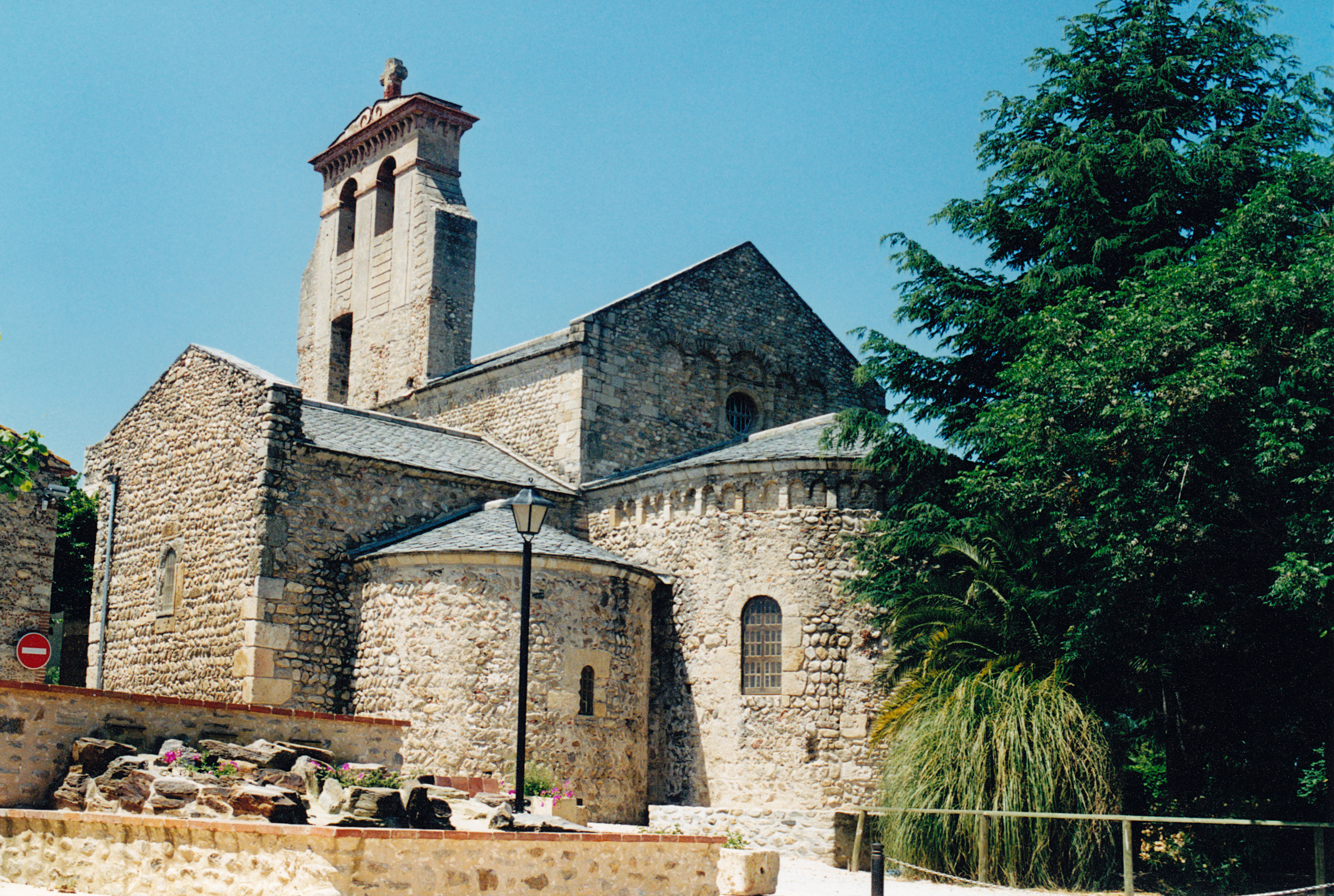
- The church in Saint-André-de-Sorède

- Coat of arms
- Location of Saint-André
- Location within France Location within Occitanie
- Coordinates: 42°33′07″N 2°58′27″E
- Country: France
- Region: Occitania
- Department: Pyrénées-Orientales
- Arrondissement: Céret
- Canton: La Côte Vermeille

Government
  - Mayor (2020–2026): Samuel Moli
- Area^{1}: 9.73 km^{2} (3.76 sq mi)
- Elevation: 38 m (125 ft)
- Highest elevation: 77 m (253 ft)
- Lowest elevation: 13 m (43 ft)
- Population (2023): 3,388
  - Density: 348/km^{2} (902/sq mi)
- Time zone: UTC+01:00 (CET)
  - Summer (DST): UTC+02:00 (CEST)
- INSEE/Postal code: 66168 /66690
- ^{1} French Land Register data, which excludes lakes, ponds, glaciers > 1 km^{2} (0.386 sq mi or 247 acres) and river estuaries.

Saint-André (French pronunciation: [sɛ̃.t‿ɑ̃dʁe]; Catalan: Sant Andreu de Sureda) is a commune in the Pyrénées-Orientales department in southern France.

== Geography ==
Saint-André is in the canton of La Côte Vermeille and in the arrondissement of Céret.

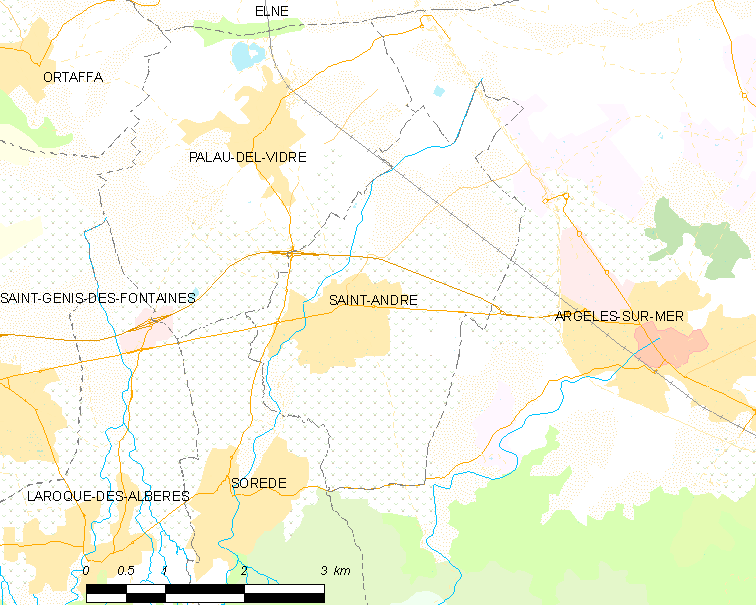
Map of Saint-André and its surrounding communes

== Population ==
Historical population
Year	Pop.	±% p.a.
1968	843	—
1975	1,016	+2.70%
1982	1,718	+7.79%
1990	2,123	+2.68%
1999	2,519	+1.92%
2007	2,717	+0.95%
2012	3,266	+3.75%
2017	3,443	+1.06%
2023	3,388	−0.27%
Source: INSEE

== See also ==
- Communes of the Pyrénées-Orientales department
