= Caudiès-de-Conflent =

Caudiès-de-Conflent Caudiers de Conflent
- Commune
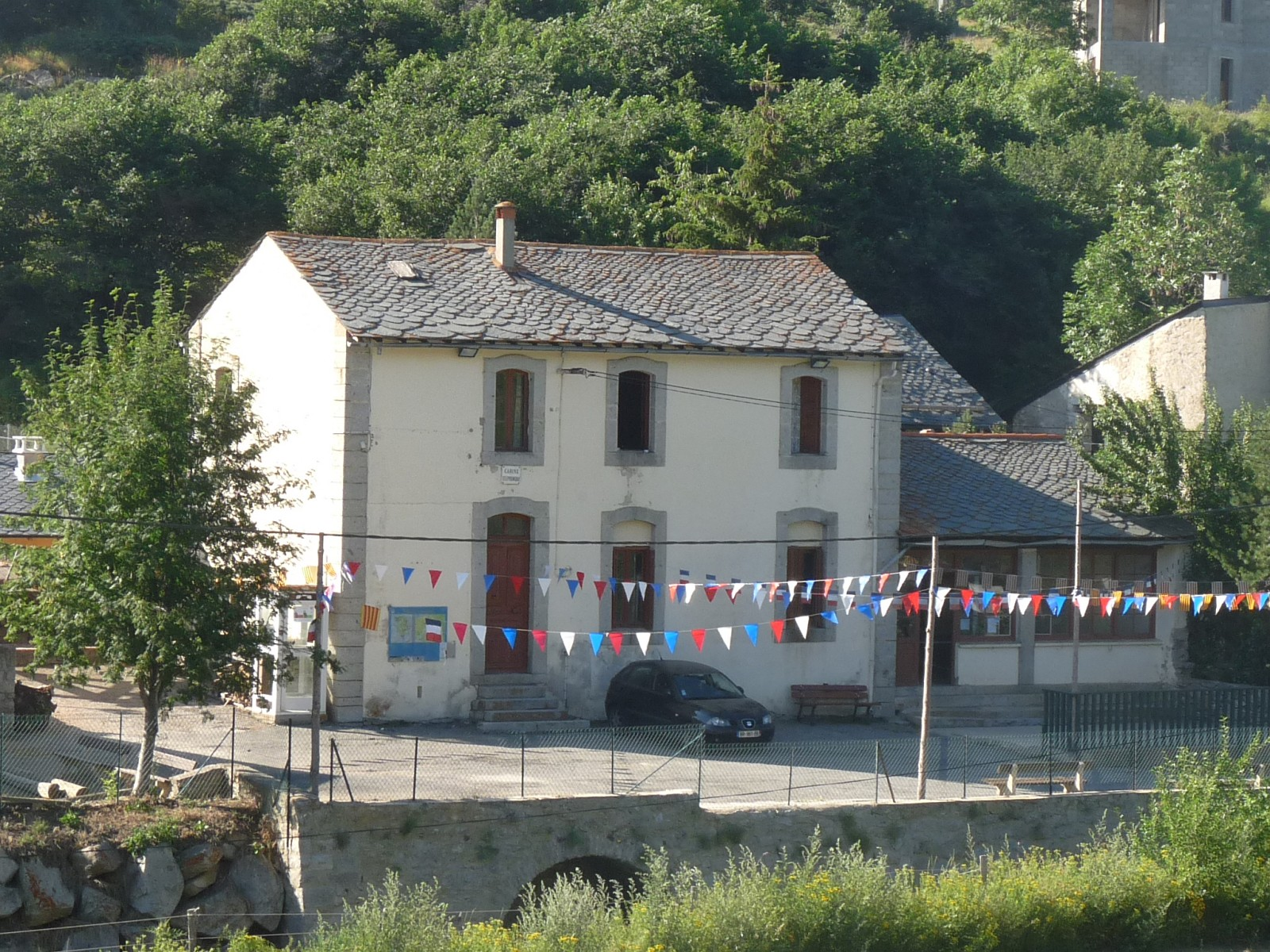
- The old school and village hall
- Location of Caudiès-de-Conflent
- Location within France Location within Occitanie
- Coordinates: 42°34′05″N 2°09′43″E
- Country: France
- Region: Occitania
- Department: Pyrénées-Orientales
- Arrondissement: Prades
- Canton: Les Pyrénées catalanes
- Intercommunality: Pyrénées Catalanes

Government
  - Mayor (2020–2026): Christian Landrieu
- Area^{1}: 6.50 km^{2} (2.51 sq mi)
- Elevation: 1,625 m (5,331 ft)
- Highest elevation: 2,045 m (6,709 ft)
- Lowest elevation: 1,616 m (5,302 ft)
- Population (2023): 23
  - Density: 3.5/km^{2} (9.2/sq mi)
- Time zone: UTC+01:00 (CET)
  - Summer (DST): UTC+02:00 (CEST)
- INSEE/Postal code: 66047 /66220
- ^{1} French Land Register data, which excludes lakes, ponds, glaciers > 1 km^{2} (0.386 sq mi or 247 acres) and river estuaries.

Caudiès-de-Conflent (French pronunciation: [kodjɛs də kɔ̃flɑ̃], literally Caudiès of Conflent; Catalan: Caudiers de Conflent) is a commune in the Pyrénées-Orientales department in southern France.

== Geography ==
=== Localisation ===
Caudiès-de-Conflent is located in the canton of Les Pyrénées catalanes and in the arrondissement of Prades.

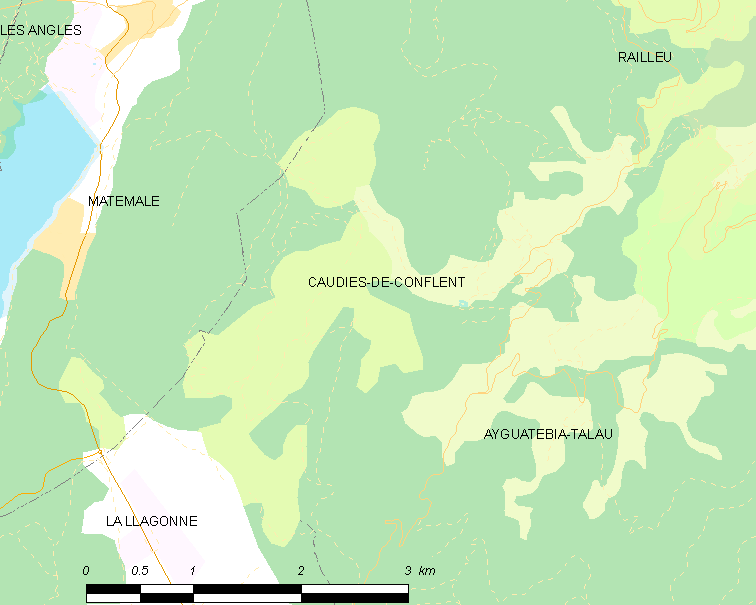
Map of Caudiès-de-Conflent and its surrounding communes

== Population ==
Historical population
| Year | Pop. | ±% p.a. |
|---|---|---|
| 1968 | 5 | — |
| 1975 | 6 | +2.64% |
| 1982 | 2 | −14.52% |
| 1990 | 2 | +0.00% |
| 1999 | 6 | +12.98% |
| 2007 | 12 | +9.05% |
| 2012 | 15 | +4.56% |
| 2017 | 17 | +2.53% |
| 2023 | 23 | +5.17% |
Source: INSEE

== See also ==
- Communes of the Pyrénées-Orientales department
