= Canton of La Côte Vermeille =

Coordinates: 42°28′59″N 3°7′1″E

La Côte Vermeille
- Canton
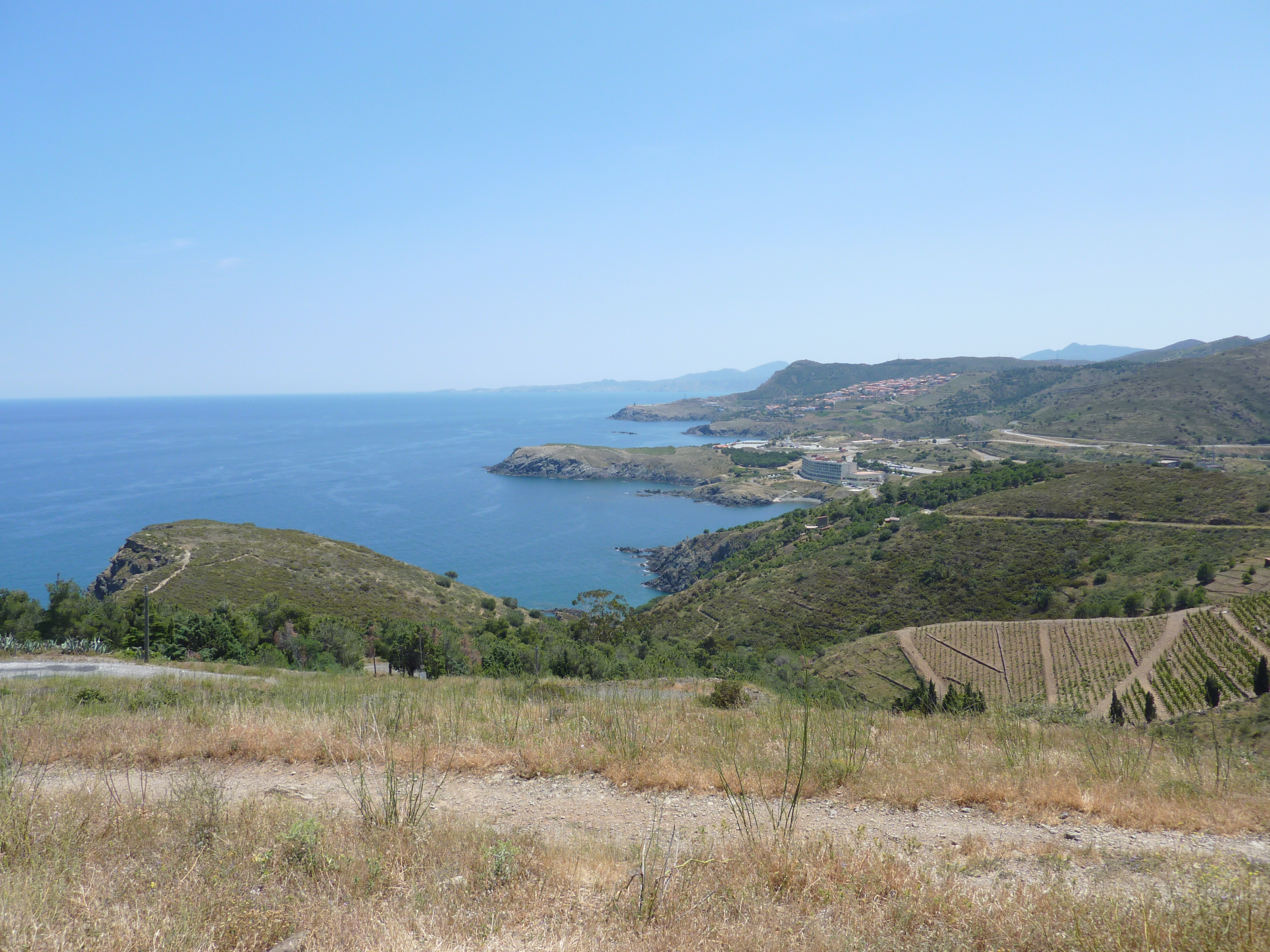
- Interactive map of La Côte Vermeille
- Country: France
- Region: Occitania
- Department: Pyrénées-Orientales
- No. of communes: {{{nbcomm}}}
- Area: 157.21 km^{2} (60.70 sq mi)
- Population (2023): 29,812
  - Density: 189.63/km^{2} (491.14/sq mi)
- INSEE code: 6605

The canton of La Côte Vermeille is a canton of France, in the Pyrénées-Orientales department. Its chief town is Argelès-sur-Mer (before 2015: Port-Vendres).

== Composition ==
At the French canton reorganisation which came into effect in March 2015, the canton was expanded from 4 to 7 communes:

- Argelès-sur-Mer
- Banyuls-sur-Mer
- Cerbère
- Collioure
- Palau-del-Vidre
- Port-Vendres
- Saint-André

== See also ==
- Cantons of the Pyrénées-Orientales department
- Communes of the Pyrénées-Orientales department
