= Arboussols =

Arboussols, Arboçols
- Commune
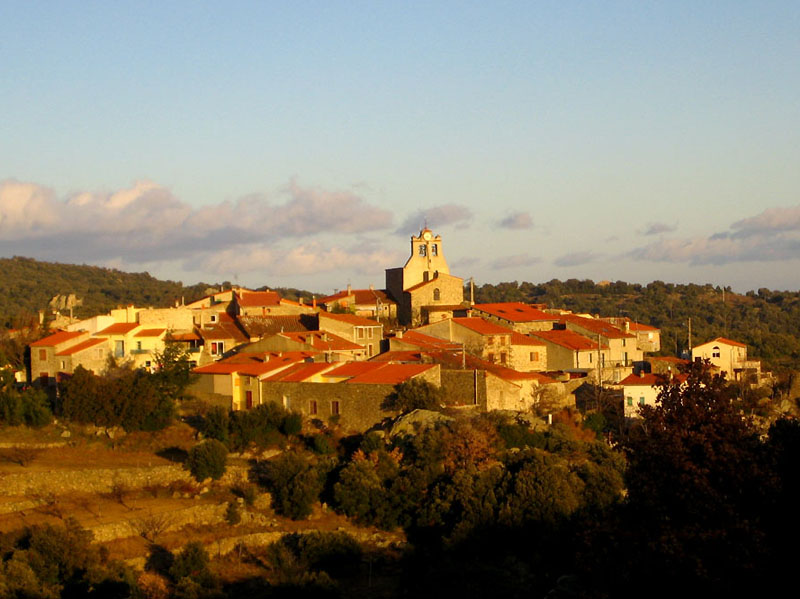
- View of Arboussols

- Coat of arms
- Location of Arboussols, Arboçols
- Location within France Location within Occitanie
- Coordinates: 42°39′52″N 2°29′10″E
- Country: France
- Region: Occitania
- Department: Pyrénées-Orientales
- Arrondissement: Prades
- Canton: La Vallée de l'Agly

Government
  - Mayor (2020–2026): Fernand Cabeza
- Area^{1}: 14.08 km^{2} (5.44 sq mi)
- Elevation: 593 m (1,946 ft)
- Highest elevation: 1,004 m (3,294 ft)
- Lowest elevation: 242 m (794 ft)
- Population (2023): 130
  - Density: 9.2/km^{2} (24/sq mi)
- Time zone: UTC+01:00 (CET)
  - Summer (DST): UTC+02:00 (CEST)
- INSEE/Postal code: 66007 /66320
- ^{1} French Land Register data, which excludes lakes, ponds, glaciers > 1 km^{2} (0.386 sq mi or 247 acres) and river estuaries.

Arboussols (French pronunciation: [aʁbusɔls]; Catalan: Arboçols) is a commune in the Pyrénées-Orientales department in southern France.

== Geography ==
=== Localisation ===
Arboussols is located in the canton of La Vallée de l'Agly and in the arrondissement of Prades.

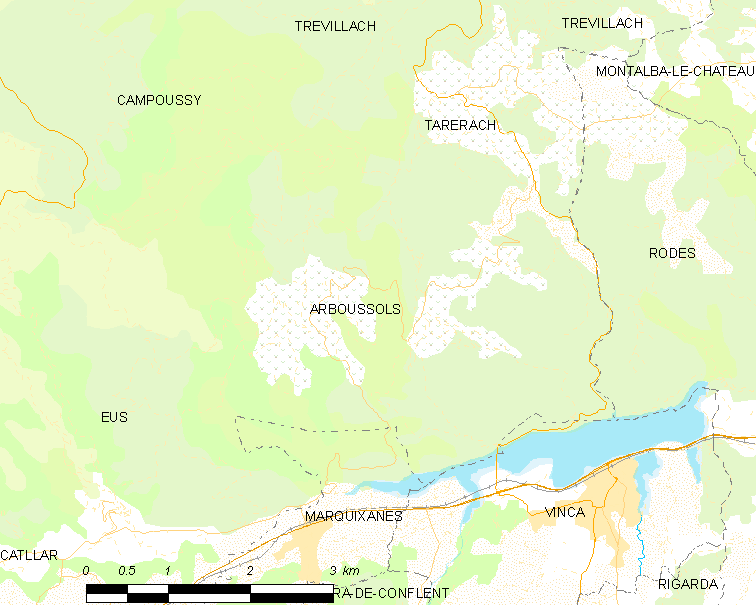
Map of Arboussols and its surrounding communes

== Government and politics ==
=== Mayors ===
Mayor	Term start	Term end
Éloi Aubert	1983	1989
Jean-Claude Delseny	2001	2014
Étienne Surjus	2014	

== Population ==
Historical population
Year	Pop.	±% p.a.
1968	104	—
1975	85	−2.84%
1982	81	−0.69%
1990	79	−0.31%
1999	95	+2.07%
2007	107	+1.50%
2012	101	−1.15%
2017	118	+3.16%
2023	130	+1.63%
Source: INSEE

== Sites of interest ==
- The church of Saint Saviour in Arboussols;
- The church of Saint Eulalia in Arboussols;
- The medieval hamlet of Marcevol;
- The priory of Marcevol;
- The church of Our Lady of the Stairs in Marcevol;
- The half-dolmen de la Llosa del Cortal dels Polls.

== See also ==
- Communes of the Pyrénées-Orientales department
