= Trévillach =

Trévillach Trevilhac
- Commune
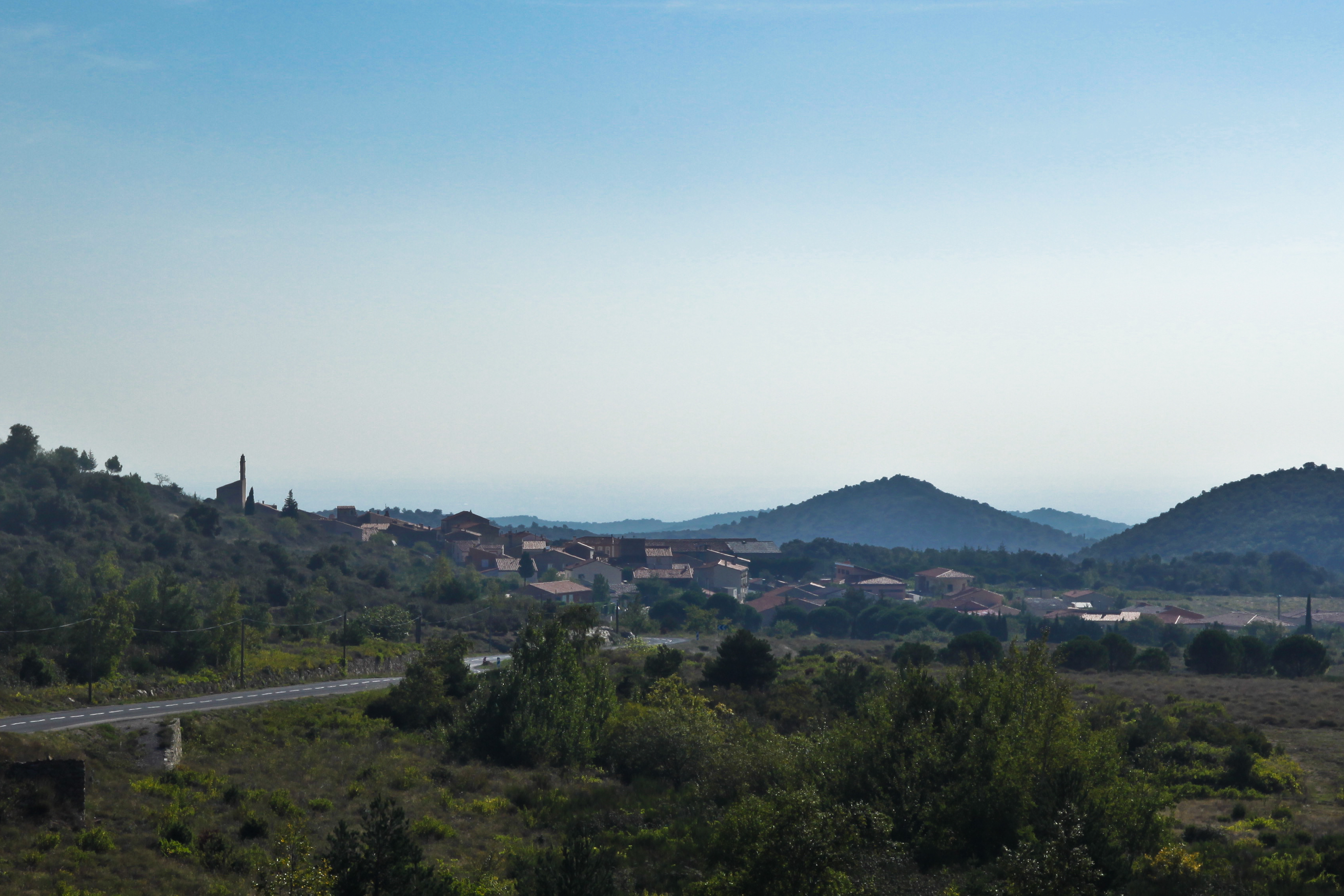
- A general view of Trévillach

- Coat of arms
- Location of Trévillach
- Location within France Location within Occitanie
- Coordinates: 42°42′34″N 2°31′51″E
- Country: France
- Region: Occitania
- Department: Pyrénées-Orientales
- Arrondissement: Prades
- Canton: La Vallée de l'Agly
- Intercommunality: Conflent-Canigó

Government
  - Mayor (2020–2026): Claude Sire
- Area^{1}: 17.24 km^{2} (6.66 sq mi)
- Elevation: 486 m (1,594 ft)
- Highest elevation: 800 m (2,600 ft)
- Lowest elevation: 346 m (1,135 ft)
- Population (2023): 201
  - Density: 11.7/km^{2} (30.2/sq mi)
- Time zone: UTC+01:00 (CET)
  - Summer (DST): UTC+02:00 (CEST)
- INSEE/Postal code: 66215 /66130
- ^{1} French Land Register data, which excludes lakes, ponds, glaciers > 1 km^{2} (0.386 sq mi or 247 acres) and river estuaries.

Trévillach (French pronunciation: [tʁevijak]; Occitan: Trevilhac; Catalan: Trevillac) is a commune in the Pyrénées-Orientales department in southern France.

== Geography ==
=== Localisation ===
Trévillach is located in the canton of La Vallée de l'Agly and in the arrondissement of Prades.

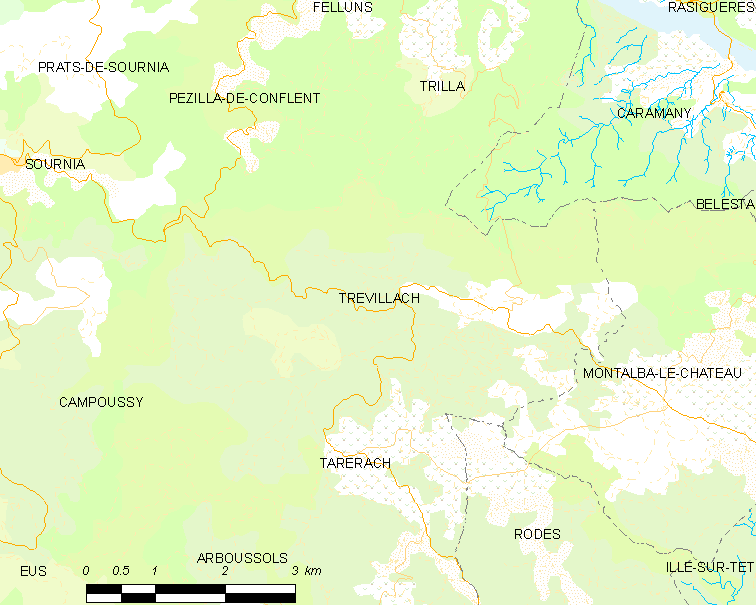
Map of Trévillach and its surrounding communes

== Population and society ==
=== Demography ===
Historical population
Year	Pop.	±% p.a.
1968	139	—
1975	137	−0.21%
1982	109	−3.21%
1990	92	−2.10%
1999	76	−2.10%
2007	111	+4.85%
2012	134	+3.84%
2017	157	+3.22%
2023	201	+4.20%
Source: INSEE

=== Events ===
- Patronal feast : 11 November.
- Communal feast : 22 August.

== See also ==
- Communes of the Pyrénées-Orientales department
