= L'Écluse =

Village in Brabant, Wallonia

L'Écluse Scluze (Walloon)
- Village
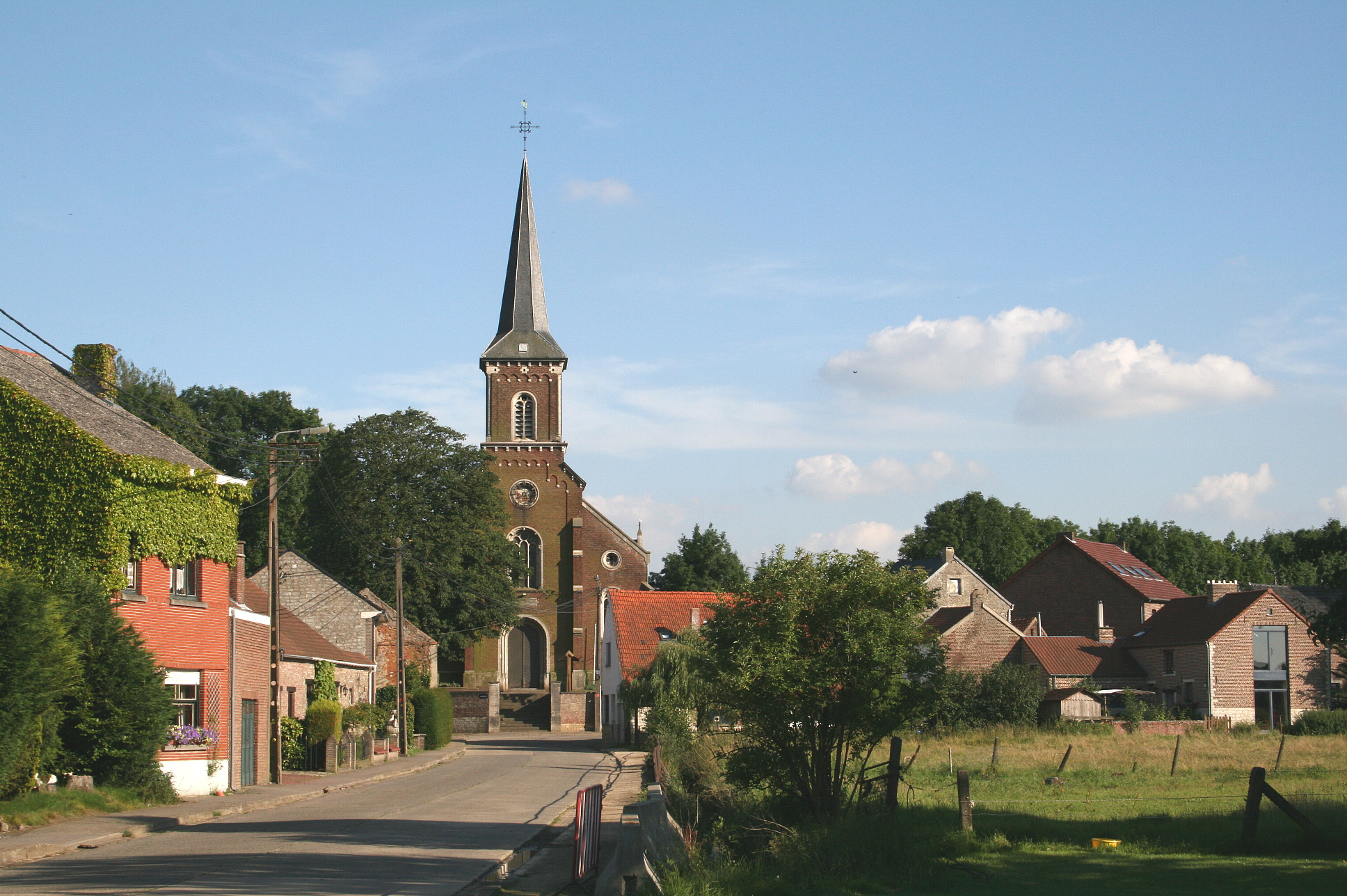
- Church borough

- Location within Walloon Brabant

- Location in Belgium
- Coordinates: 50°46′18″N 4°49′55″E
- Country: Belgium
- Region: Wallonia
- Province: Walloon Brabant
- Municipality: Beauvechain

L'Écluse (French pronunciation: [leklyz]; Dutch: Sluizen, pronounced [ˈslœyzə(n)]; Walloon: Scluze) is a village of Wallonia and a district of the municipality of Beauvechain, located in the province of Walloon Brabant, Belgium.

It was a municipality in its own right before the fusion of the Belgian municipalities in 1977.
