= Prunet-et-Belpuig =

Prunet-et-Belpuig Prunet i Bellpuig
- Commune
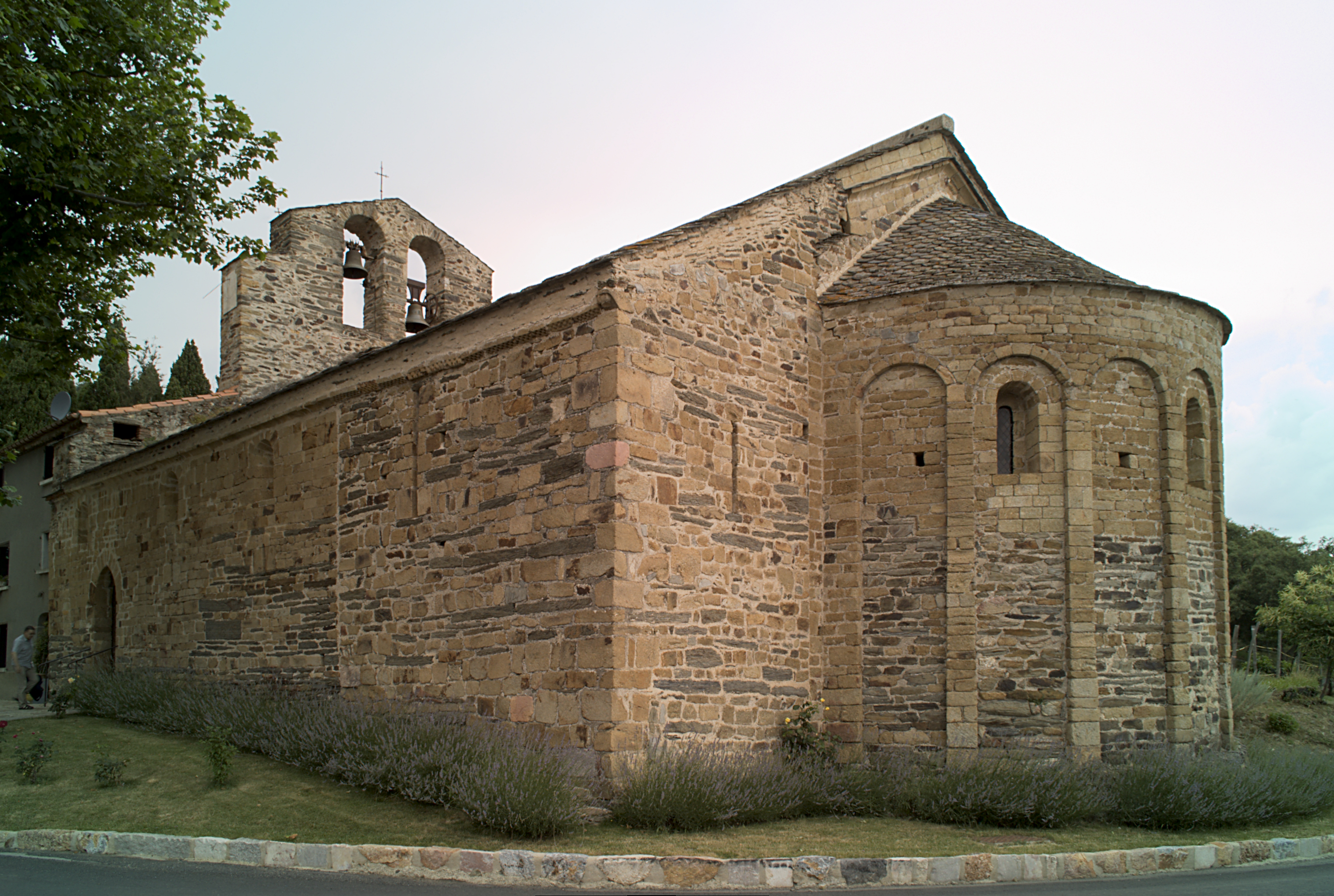
- The Chapel of the Trinity, in Prunet-et-Belpuig
- Location of Prunet-et-Belpuig
- Location within France Location within Occitanie
- Coordinates: 42°33′46″N 2°37′32″E
- Country: France
- Region: Occitania
- Department: Pyrénées-Orientales
- Arrondissement: Prades
- Canton: Le Canigou
- Intercommunality: Roussillon Conflent

Government
  - Mayor (2020–2026): Benoît Bonacaze
- Area^{1}: 21.68 km^{2} (8.37 sq mi)
- Elevation: 660 m (2,170 ft)
- Highest elevation: 863 m (2,831 ft)
- Lowest elevation: 353 m (1,158 ft)
- Population (2023): 44
  - Density: 2.0/km^{2} (5.3/sq mi)
- Time zone: UTC+01:00 (CET)
  - Summer (DST): UTC+02:00 (CEST)
- INSEE/Postal code: 66153 /66130
- ^{1} French Land Register data, which excludes lakes, ponds, glaciers > 1 km^{2} (0.386 sq mi or 247 acres) and river estuaries.

Prunet-et-Belpuig (French pronunciation: [pʁynɛ e bɛlpɥitʃ]; Catalan: Prunet i Bellpuig) is a commune in Roussillon in the Pyrénées-Orientales department in southern France. It is made up of the hamlets of Prunet (geographically of Roussillon) and Bellpuig (geographically of Vallespir), as well as the sanctuary of the Trinity where there is the town hall. The population is scattered over sundry farms and cottages in the area.

== Geography ==
Prunet-et-Belpuig is in the canton of Le Canigou and in the arrondissement of Prades.

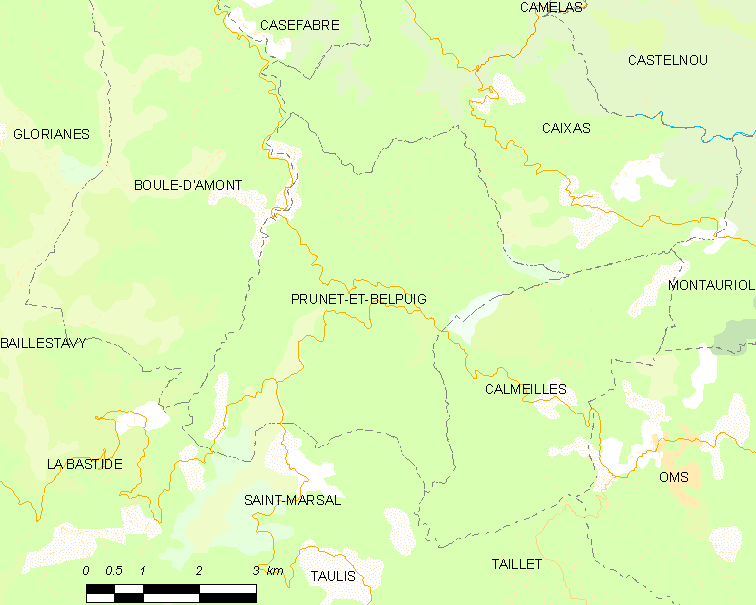
Map of Prunet-et-Belpuig and its surrounding communes

== Population ==
Historical population
Year	Pop.	±% p.a.
1968	55	—
1975	36	−5.87%
1982	37	+0.39%
1990	52	+4.35%
1999	68	+3.03%
2007	58	−1.97%
2012	54	−1.42%
2017	49	−1.92%
2023	44	−1.78%
Source: INSEE

== See also ==
- Communes of the Pyrénées-Orientales department
