= Conat, Pyrénées-Orientales =

Conat
- Commune
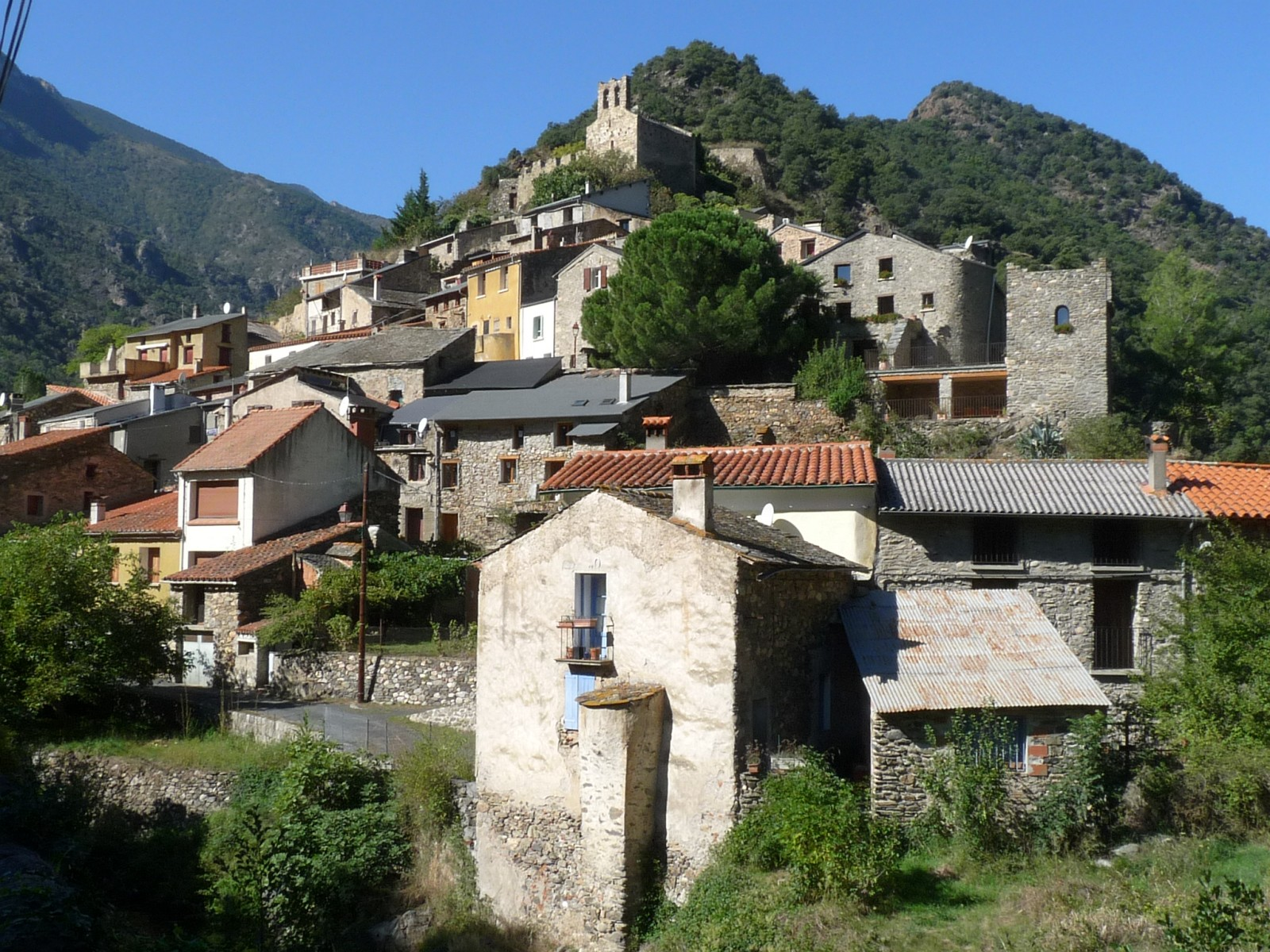
- The church of Sainte-Marguerite of Nabilles, and surrounding buildings, in Conat
- Location of Conat
- Location within France Location within Occitanie
- Coordinates: 42°36′51″N 2°21′27″E
- Country: France
- Region: Occitania
- Department: Pyrénées-Orientales
- Arrondissement: Prades
- Canton: Les Pyrénées catalanes

Government
  - Mayor (2020–2026): Johanna Messager
- Area^{1}: 19.12 km^{2} (7.38 sq mi)
- Elevation: 530 m (1,740 ft)
- Highest elevation: 1,680 m (5,510 ft)
- Lowest elevation: 467 m (1,532 ft)
- Population (2023): 65
  - Density: 3.4/km^{2} (8.8/sq mi)
- Time zone: UTC+01:00 (CET)
  - Summer (DST): UTC+02:00 (CEST)
- INSEE/Postal code: 66054 /66500
- ^{1} French Land Register data, which excludes lakes, ponds, glaciers > 1 km^{2} (0.386 sq mi or 247 acres) and river estuaries.

Conat is a commune in the Pyrénées-Orientales department in southern France.

== Geography ==
=== Localisation ===
Conat is located in the canton of Les Pyrénées catalanes and in the arrondissement of Prades.

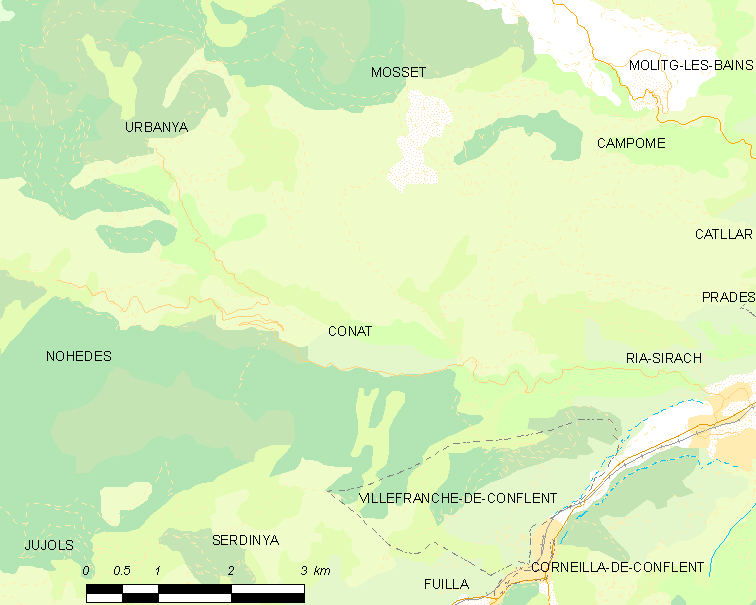
Map of Conat and its surrounding communes

== Population ==
Historical population
Year	Pop.	±% p.a.
1968	50	—
1975	38	−3.84%
1982	45	+2.44%
1990	40	−1.46%
1999	45	+1.32%
2007	52	+1.82%
2012	55	+1.13%
2017	61	+2.09%
2023	65	+1.06%
Source: INSEE

== See also ==
- Communes of the Pyrénées-Orientales department
