= Pézilla-de-Conflent =

Pézilla-de-Conflent Pesilhan de Conflent
- Commune
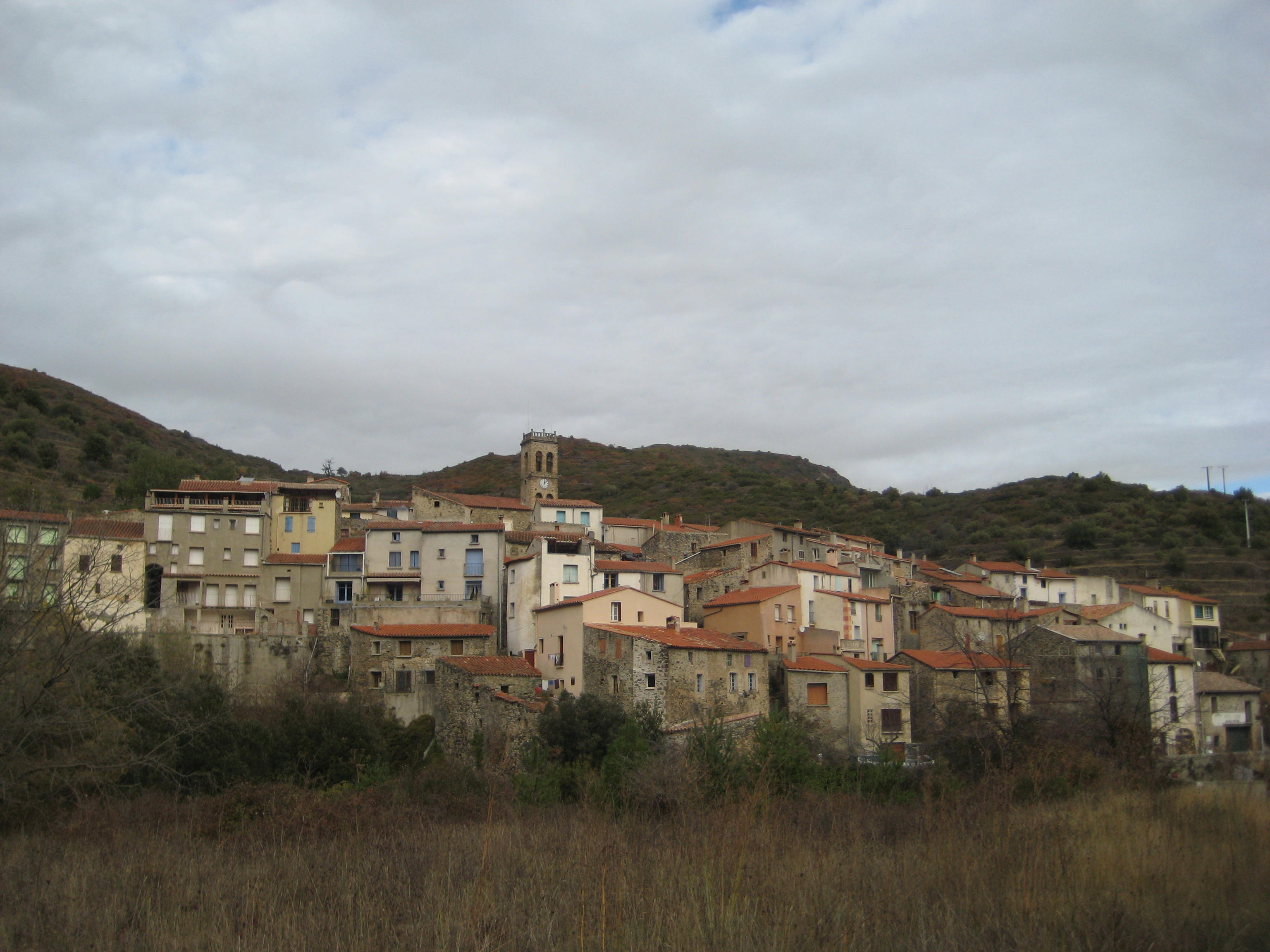
- A general view of Pézilla-de-Conflent

- Coat of arms
- Location of Pézilla-de-Conflent
- Location within France Location within Occitanie
- Coordinates: 42°44′21″N 2°28′57″E
- Country: France
- Region: Occitania
- Department: Pyrénées-Orientales
- Arrondissement: Prades
- Canton: La Vallée de l'Agly
- Area^{1}: 6.85 km^{2} (2.64 sq mi)
- Elevation: 300 m (980 ft)
- Highest elevation: 763 m (2,503 ft)
- Lowest elevation: 240 m (790 ft)
- Population (2023): 46
  - Density: 6.7/km^{2} (17/sq mi)
- Time zone: UTC+01:00 (CET)
  - Summer (DST): UTC+02:00 (CEST)
- INSEE/Postal code: 66139 /66730
- ^{1} French Land Register data, which excludes lakes, ponds, glaciers > 1 km^{2} (0.386 sq mi or 247 acres) and river estuaries.

Pézilla-de-Conflent (French pronunciation: [pezija də kɔ̃flɑ̃], Pézilla of Conflent; Occitan: Pesilhan de Conflent) is a commune in the Pyrénées-Orientales department in southern France.

== Geography ==
Pézilla-de-Conflent is located in the canton of La Vallée de l'Agly and in the arrondissement of Prades.

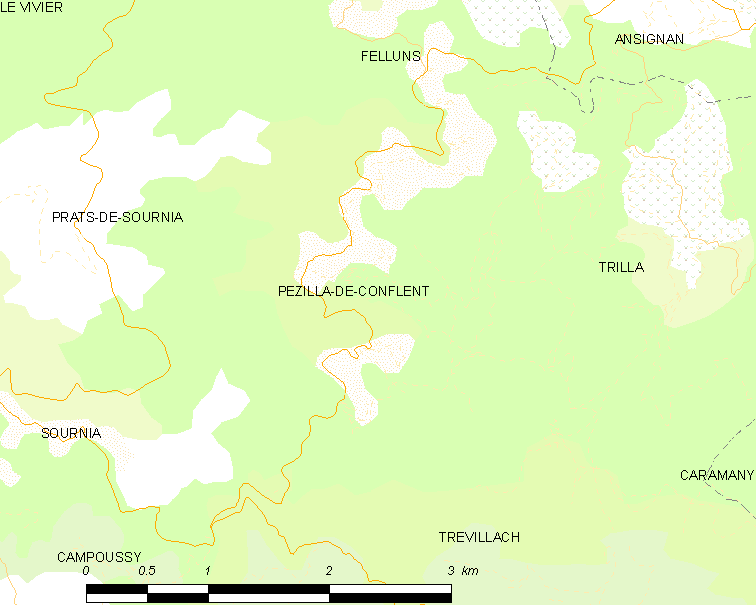
Map of Pézilla-de-Conflent and its surrounding communes

== Population ==
Historical population
Year	Pop.	±% p.a.
1968	75	—
1975	62	−2.68%
1982	69	+1.54%
1990	52	−3.47%
1999	50	−0.43%
2007	52	+0.49%
2012	58	+2.21%
2017	46	−4.53%
2023	46	+0.00%
Source: INSEE

== See also ==
- Communes of the Pyrénées-Orientales department
