= Prats-Saint-Thomas =

Coordinates: 42°29′54″N 2°10′16″E

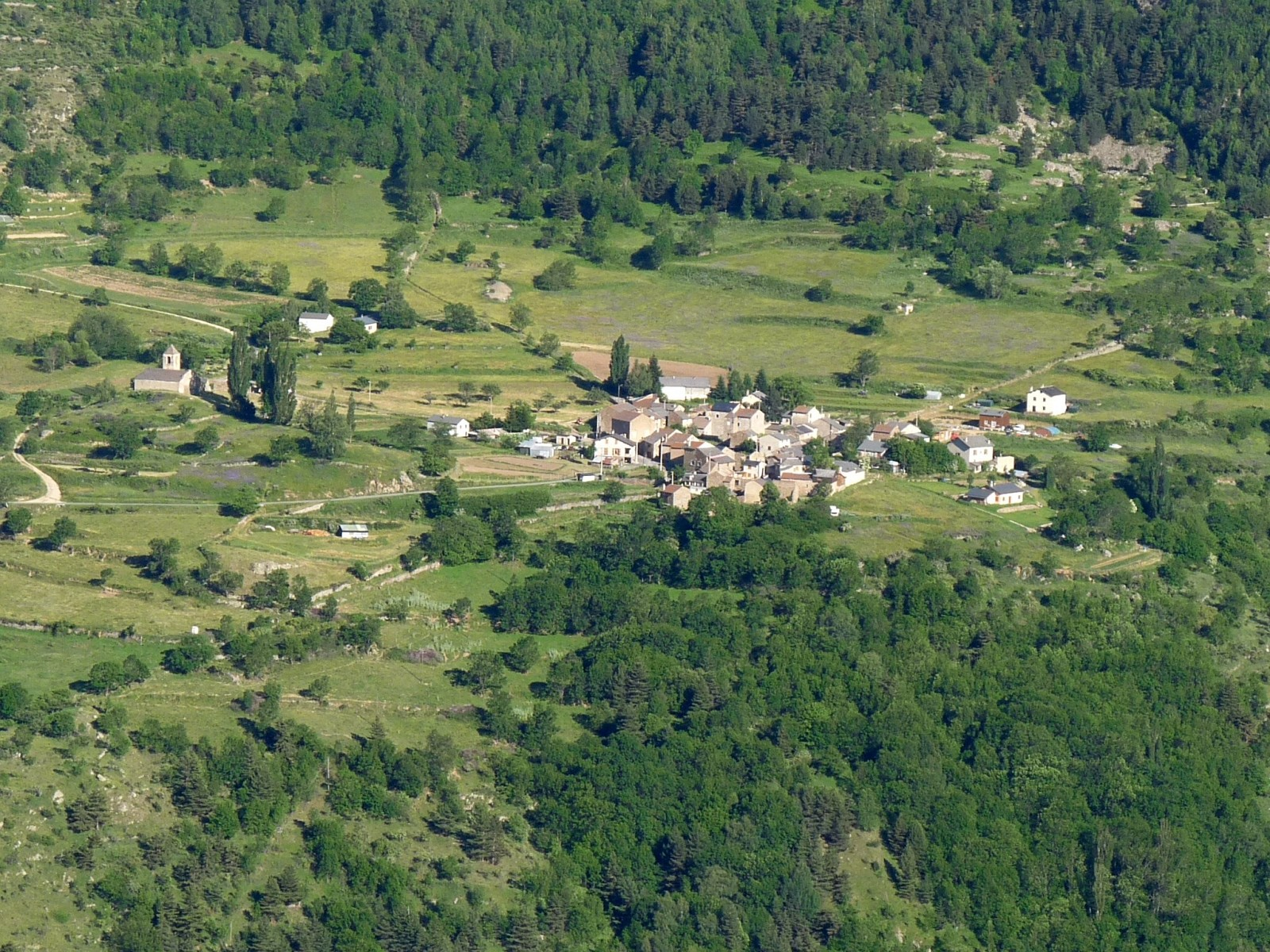
Prats-Balaguer

Prats-Saint-Thomas (Catalan: Prats i Sant Tomàs) is a former commune in Pyrénées-Orientales (France).

== Geography ==
=== Location ===
Prats-Saint-Thomas is located west of Fontpédrouse.

=== Hydrography ===
The river Têt runs through the north of Prats-Saint-Thomas, from the west to the east.

== History ==
The commune of Prats-Saint-Thomas was created in 1793 by uniting the hamlets of Prats-Balaguer and Saint-Thomas. Since 26 June 1822, it was linked with Fontpédrouse.

Part of the hamlets were destroyed in December 1932 because of heavy rains which caused several landslides.

== Sites of interest ==
- Church of Trinity and Saint Mary of Prats-Balaguer, from the 11th century.

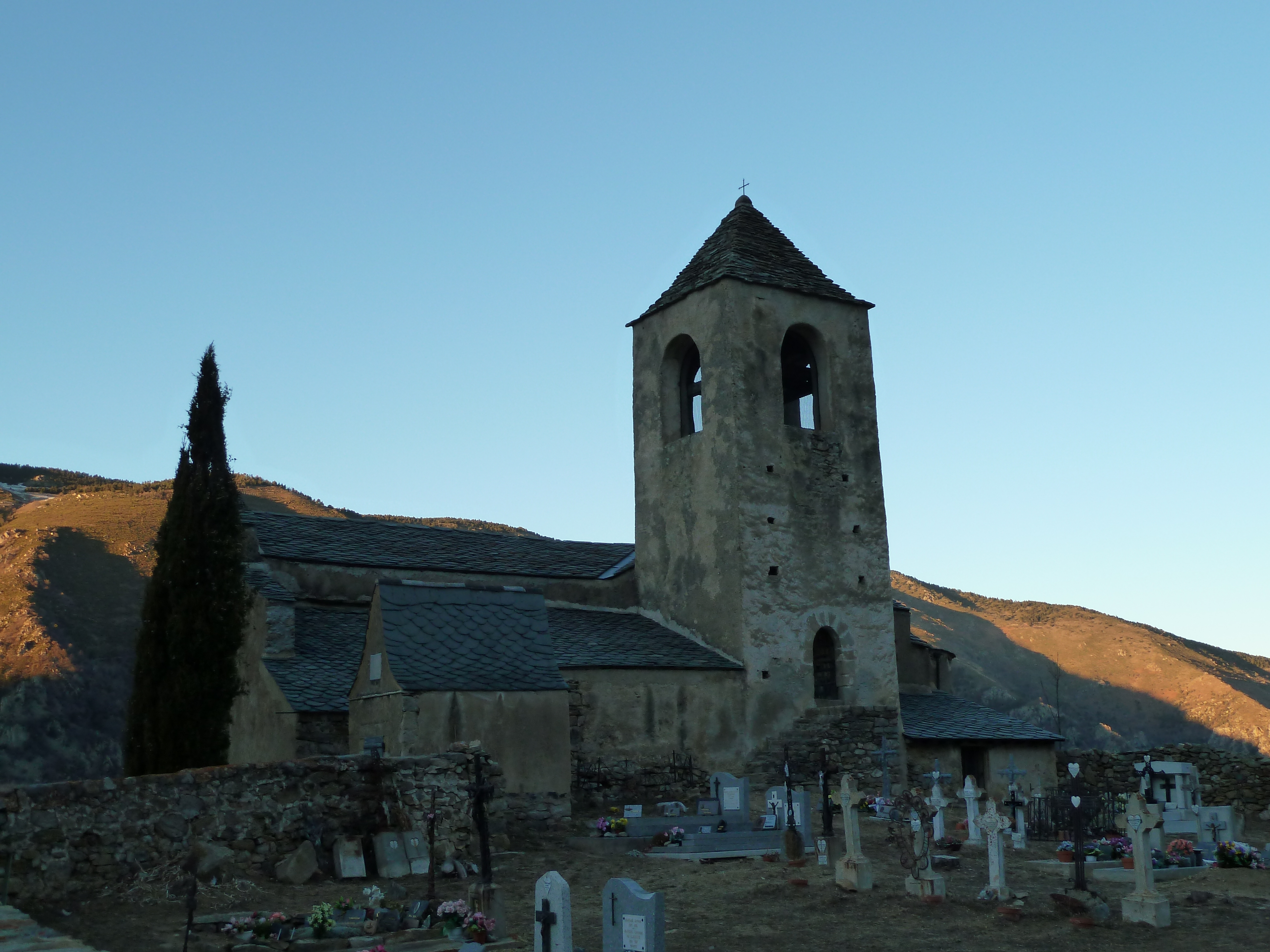
The church in Prats-Balaguer
