= Communauté de communes Conflent-Canigó =

Community of comumunes in Pyrénées-Orientales, France

- Community
- Interactive map of Communauté de communes Conflent-Canigó
- Coordinates: 42°36′51.51″N 2°24′54.29″E
- Country: France
- Region: Occitanie
- Department: Pyrénées-Orientales

Population (2022)
  - Total: 20,918

The Community of Municipalities of Conflent Canigó is a community of communes in the Pyrénées-Orientales department in the Occitanie region of southern France.

It was born from the merger at the initiative of the elected officials between the Vinça Canigou community of municipalities and the Confluent community of municipalities on 1 January 2015.

== History ==
The community of communes of Conflent was created on 1 January 2009 and became part of the community of communes Canigou - Val Cady on 1 January 2014. The Vinça Canigou community of municipalities was created on 1 January 1998.

These two communities of municipalities merged to give birth on 1 January 2015 to the community of Municipalities Conflent Canigó bringing together 47 municipalities. A prefectural plan envisaged authorizing the municipalities of Vinça and Baillestavy to leave Vinça Canigou for Conflent, leading to a very sharp decrease in the population of the inter-municipality.

It includes 47 municipalities and 20,905 people on a territory of 832.93 square kilometres (321.60 sq mi). The structure was not threatened by the NoTRE law which imposed a first level of fifteen thousand inhabitants.
