= Prats-de-Sournia =

Prats-de-Sournia Prats de Sornian
- Commune
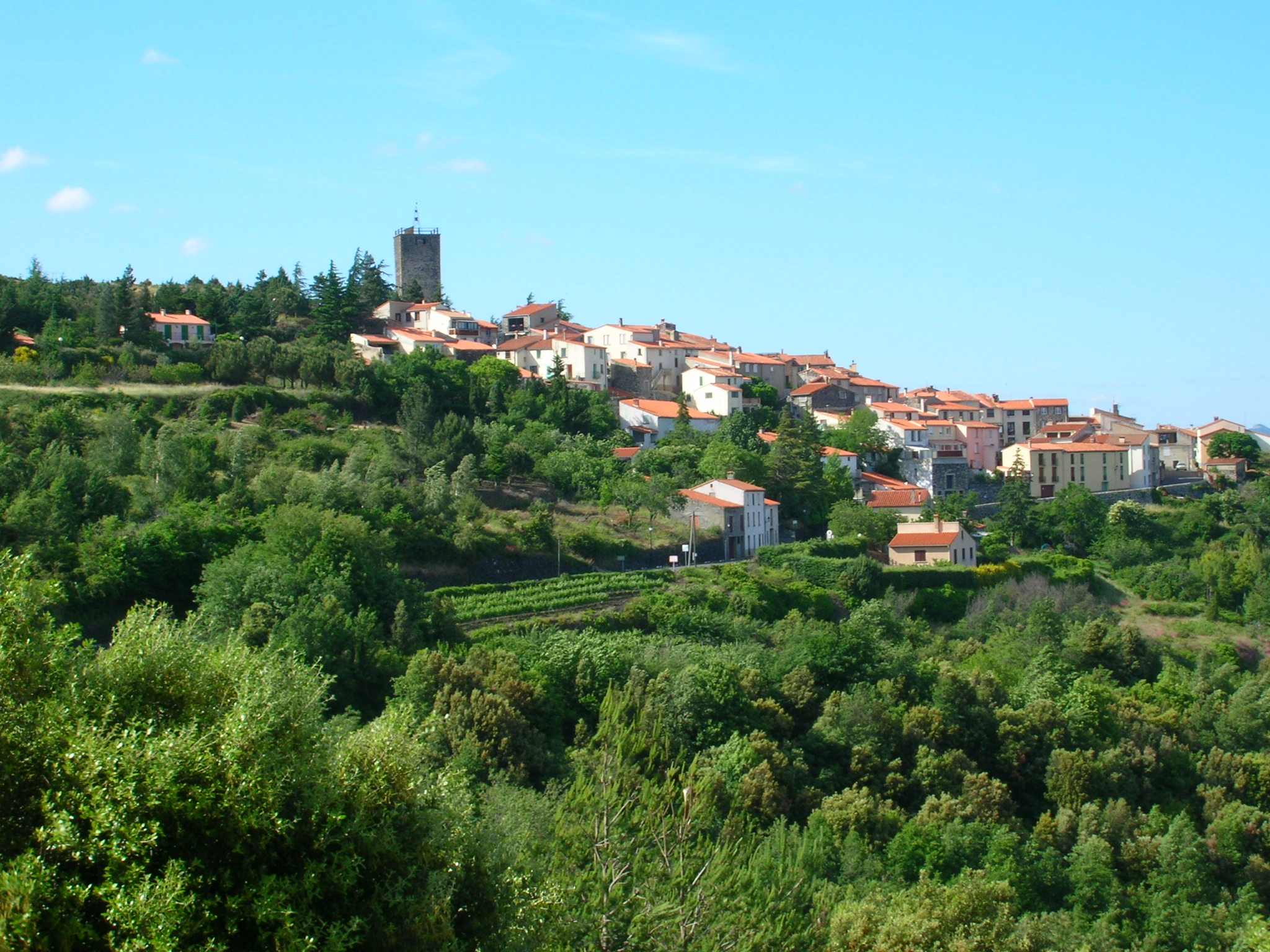
- A general view of Prats-de-Sournia

- Coat of arms
- Location of Prats-de-Sournia
- Location within France Location within Occitanie
- Coordinates: 42°44′42″N 2°27′40″E
- Country: France
- Region: Occitania
- Department: Pyrénées-Orientales
- Arrondissement: Prades
- Canton: La Vallée de l'Agly

Government
  - Mayor (2020–2026): Gilles Deulofeu
- Area^{1}: 8.01 km^{2} (3.09 sq mi)
- Elevation: 635 m (2,083 ft)
- Highest elevation: 966 m (3,169 ft)
- Lowest elevation: 347 m (1,138 ft)
- Population (2023): 76
  - Density: 9.5/km^{2} (25/sq mi)
- Time zone: UTC+01:00 (CET)
  - Summer (DST): UTC+02:00 (CEST)
- INSEE/Postal code: 66151 /66730
- ^{1} French Land Register data, which excludes lakes, ponds, glaciers > 1 km^{2} (0.386 sq mi or 247 acres) and river estuaries.

Prats-de-Sournia (French pronunciation: [pʁats də suʁnja]; Catalan: Prats de Sornià) is a commune in the Pyrénées-Orientales department in southern France.

== Geography ==
Prats-de-Sournia is in the canton of La Vallée de l'Agly and in the arrondissement of Prades.

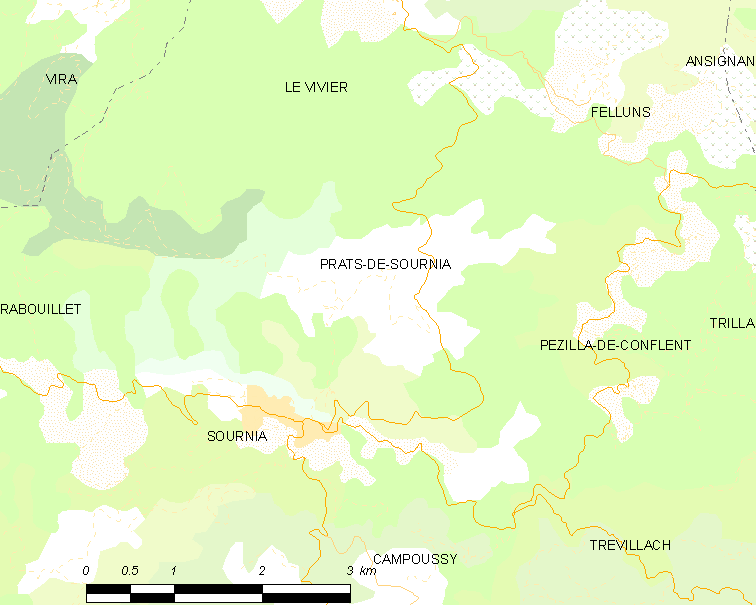
Map of Prats-de-Sournia and its surrounding communes

== Population ==
Historical population
Year	Pop.	±% p.a.
1968	113	—
1975	104	−1.18%
1982	87	−2.52%
1990	58	−4.94%
1999	58	+0.00%
2007	71	+2.56%
2012	73	+0.56%
2017	78	+1.33%
2023	76	−0.43%
Source: INSEE

== See also ==
- Communes of the Pyrénées-Orientales department
