= Communauté de communes Agly Fenouillèdes =

The Communauté de communes Agly Fenouillèdes is a community of communes in the Pyrénées-Orientales department in the Occitanie region in southern France. It has a population of 6,284 inhabitants as of 2022.

== History ==
It was created by a decree of December 26, 1996 with effect from December 31, 1996. On 1 January 2014, the municipality of Prats-de-Sournia joined the community of municipalities.
