= Canton of Vinça =

Coordinates: 42.6461°N 2.5294°E

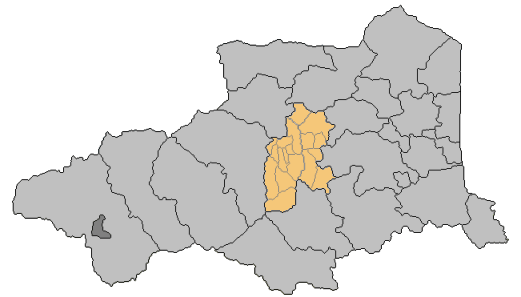
Location of the canton in Pyrénées-Orientales

The Canton of Vinça is a French former canton of the Pyrénées-Orientales department, in the Languedoc-Roussillon region. It had 11,502 inhabitants (2012). It was disbanded following the French canton reorganisation which came into effect in March 2015.

== Composition ==
The canton of Vinça comprised 18 communes:

- Vinça
- Baillestavy
- Bouleternère
- Boule-d'Amont
- Casefabre
- Espira-de-Conflent
- Estoher
- Finestret
- Glorianes
- Ille-sur-Têt
- Joch
- Marquixanes
- Montalba-le-Château
- Prunet-et-Belpuig
- Rigarda
- Rodès
- Saint-Michel-de-Llotes
- Valmanya
