= Canton of Prats-de-Mollo-la-Preste =

Coordinates: 42.4047°N 2.4797°E

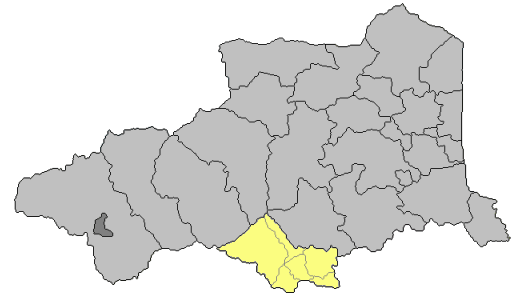
Location of the canton in Pyrénées-Orientales

The Canton of Prats-de-Mollo-la-Preste is a French former canton of the Pyrénées-Orientales department, in the Languedoc-Roussillon region. It had 2,767 inhabitants in 2012. It was disbanded following the French canton reorganisation which came into effect in March 2015. It consisted of 6 communes, which joined the new canton of Le Canigou in 2015.

== Composition ==
The canton of Prats-de-Mollo-la-Preste comprised 6 communes:

- Prats-de-Mollo-la-Preste
- Coustouges
- Lamanère
- Saint-Laurent-de-Cerdans
- Serralongue
- Le Tech
