= Canton of Arles-sur-Tech =

French administrative unit

Coordinates: 42.4500°N 2.6333°E

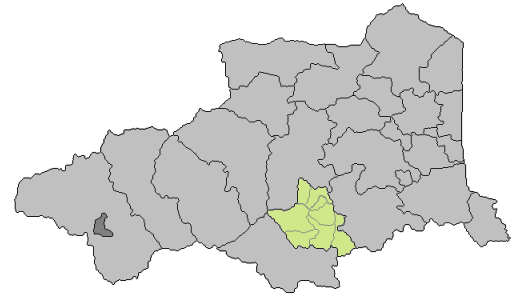
Location of the canton in Pyrénées-Orientales

The Canton of Arles-sur-Tech is a French former canton of Pyrénées-Orientales department, in Languedoc-Roussillon. It had 7,197 inhabitants (2012). It was disbanded following the French canton reorganisation which came into effect in March 2015.

== Composition ==
The canton of Arles-sur-Tech consisted of 8 communes:

- Arles-sur-Tech
- Amélie-les-Bains-Palalda
- Montferrer
- Corsavy
- Montbolo
- Saint-Marsal
- La Bastide
- Taulis
