= Tretzevents (Canigó) =

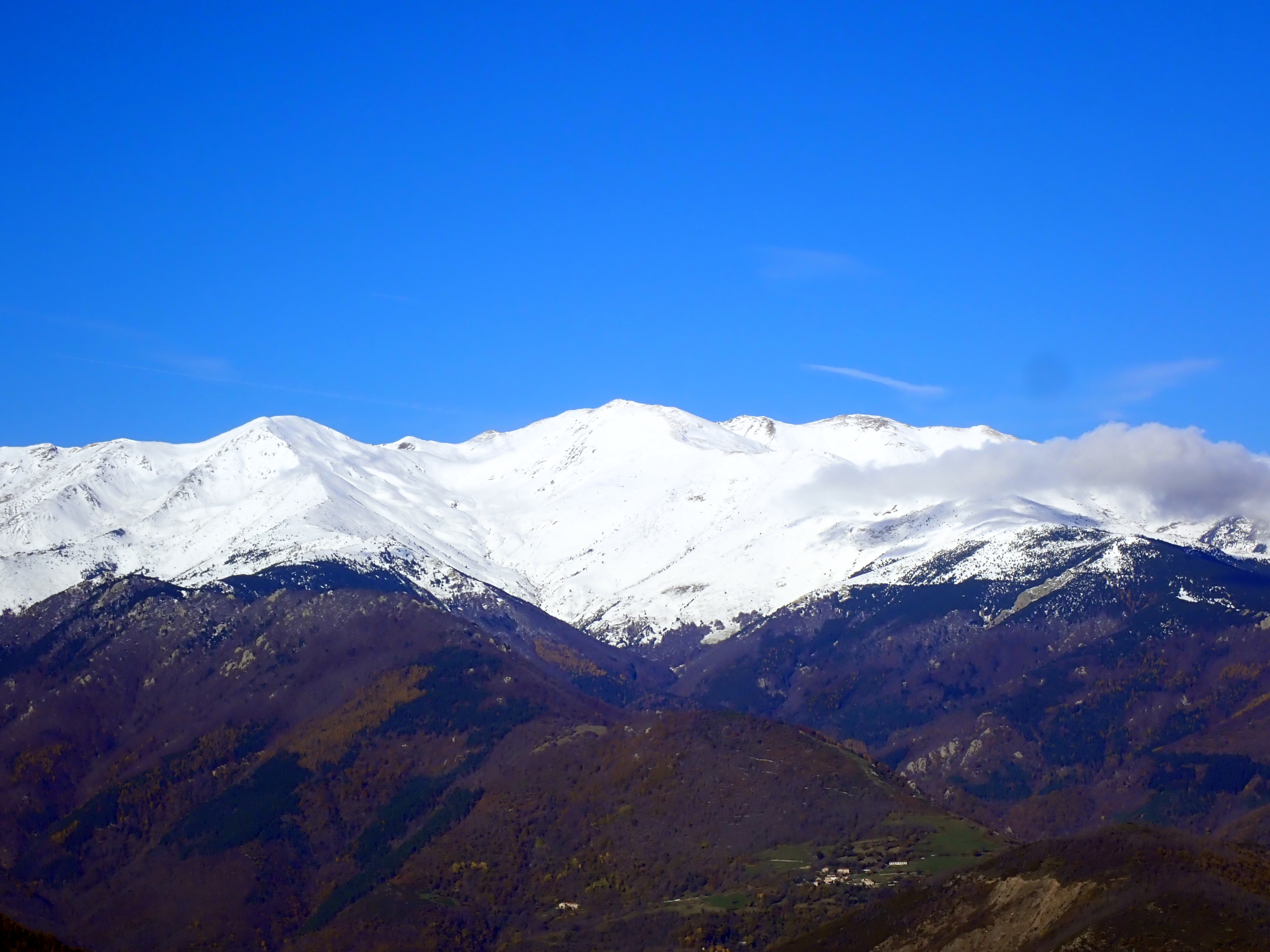
- The summit of Tretzevents from the Torres de Cabrenç.

Highest point
- Elevation: 2,731 m (8,960 ft)
- Coordinates: 42°29′30″N 2°28′08″E

Geography
- Location within Pyrenees
- Location: Vallespir, Catalonia
- Parent range: Pyrenees

Tretzevents or Puig de Tres Vents is a mountain of the Canigó Massif, Pyrenees, Pyrénées-Orientales, France. Located between the communes of Cortsaví (Corsavy) and El Tec (Le Tech), Pyrénées-Orientales, it has an elevation of 2,731 metres above sea level. A secondary 2,727 m high summit is located at the limit of the Castell de Vernet (Casteil) commune.

== See also ==
- Canigó (Canigou)
- Mountains of Catalonia
