= Joch =

Joch may refer to:

- Joch (unit of measurement), a historic unit of measurement equivalent to the yoke.
- Joch, Austrian word for saddle, often found in place names
- Joch, Pyrénées-Orientales
