= Coustouges =

Coustouges Costoja
- Commune
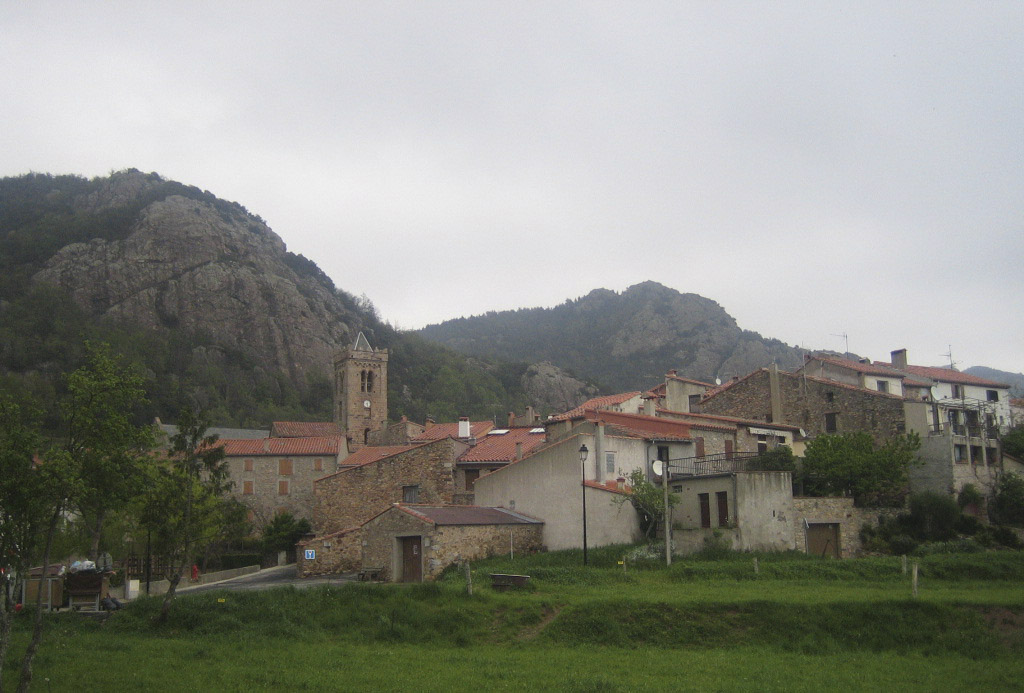
- A general view of Coustouges
- Location of Coustouges
- Location within France Location within Occitanie
- Coordinates: 42°22′07″N 2°39′02″E
- Country: France
- Region: Occitania
- Department: Pyrénées-Orientales
- Arrondissement: Céret
- Canton: Le Canigou
- Intercommunality: Haut Vallespir

Government
  - Mayor (2020–2026): Michel Anrigo
- Area^{1}: 16.86 km^{2} (6.51 sq mi)
- Elevation: 827 m (2,713 ft)
- Highest elevation: 1,120 m (3,670 ft)
- Lowest elevation: 411 m (1,348 ft)
- Population (2023): 95
  - Density: 5.6/km^{2} (15/sq mi)
- Time zone: UTC+01:00 (CET)
  - Summer (DST): UTC+02:00 (CEST)
- INSEE/Postal code: 66061 /66260
- ^{1} French Land Register data, which excludes lakes, ponds, glaciers > 1 km^{2} (0.386 sq mi or 247 acres) and river estuaries.

Coustouges (French pronunciation: [kustuʒ]; Catalan: Costoja) is a commune in the Pyrénées-Orientales department in southern France. Inhabitants are called Coustougiens (male) or Coustougiennes (female).

== Geography ==
=== Localisation ===
Coustouges is located in the canton of Le Canigou and in the arrondissement of Céret.

Coustouges is the second most southerly commune of mainland France, after Lamanère. The village is situated at an altitude of 832 m.

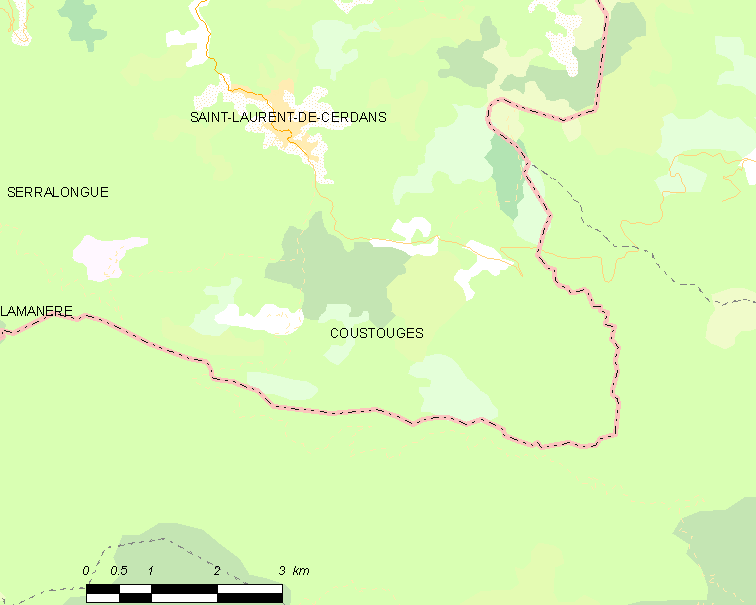
Map of Coustouges and its surrounding communes

== Toponymy ==
Coustouges was previously recorded with the name Costogia in 936, Custajas or Costogia, and finally Coustouges (end of the 19th century).

== History ==
Coustouges was a dependency of the Abbey of Arles-sur-Tech from 988 until the French Revolution.

== Population ==
Historical population
Year	Pop.	±% p.a.
1968	207	—
1975	171	−2.69%
1982	163	−0.68%
1990	119	−3.86%
1999	134	+1.33%
2007	116	−1.79%
2012	108	−1.42%
2017	98	−1.92%
2023	95	−0.52%
Source: INSEE

== Notable people ==
- Francesc Sabaté Llopart (1915-1960), anarchist, anti-Francoist maquisard, spent several years in Coustouges
- François Pinault, French entrepreneur, bought a house there in September 2004.

== Images ==
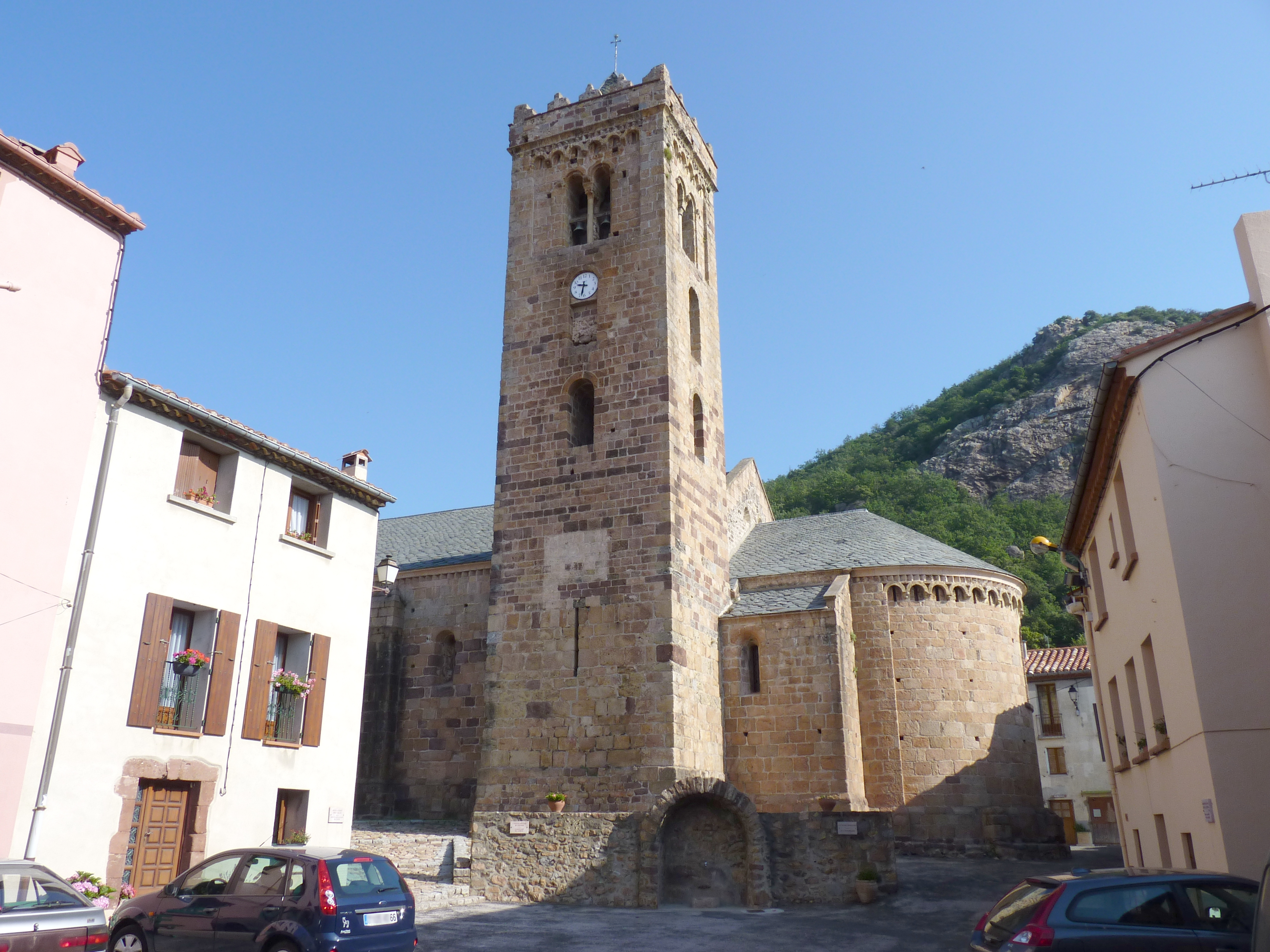
Church of Notre-Dame de l’Aubépine

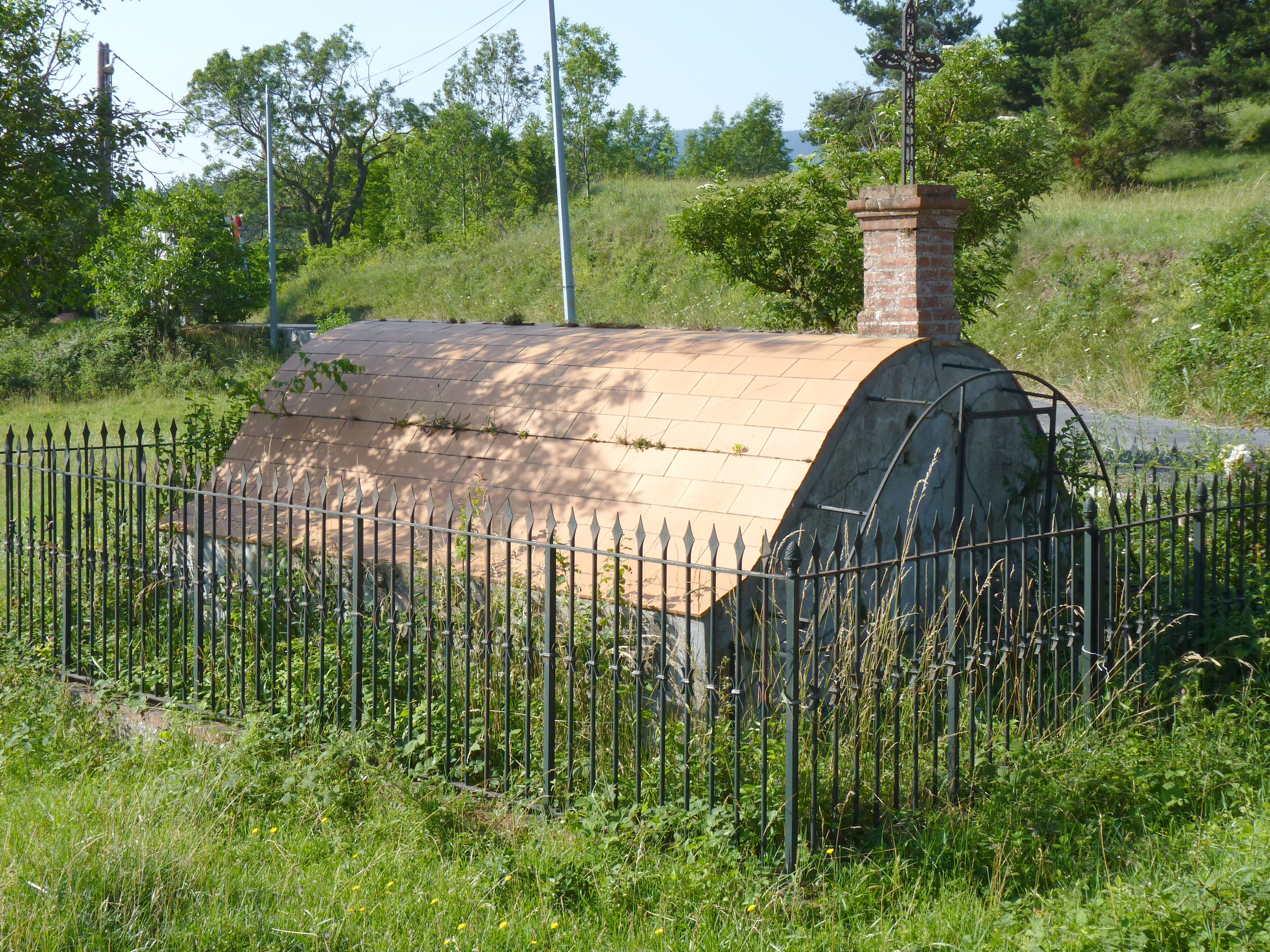
Tomb of an old family

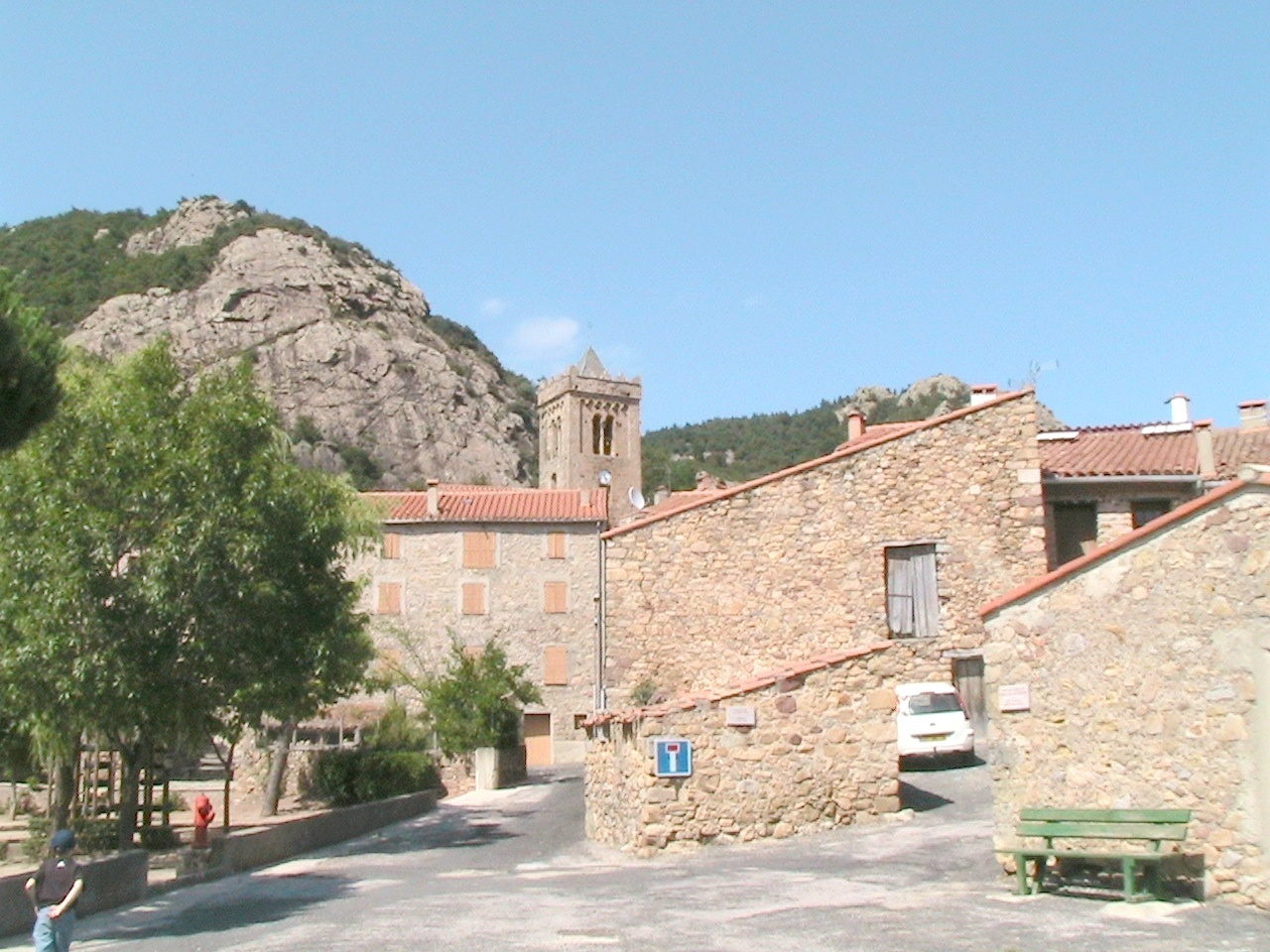
View of the church from the square

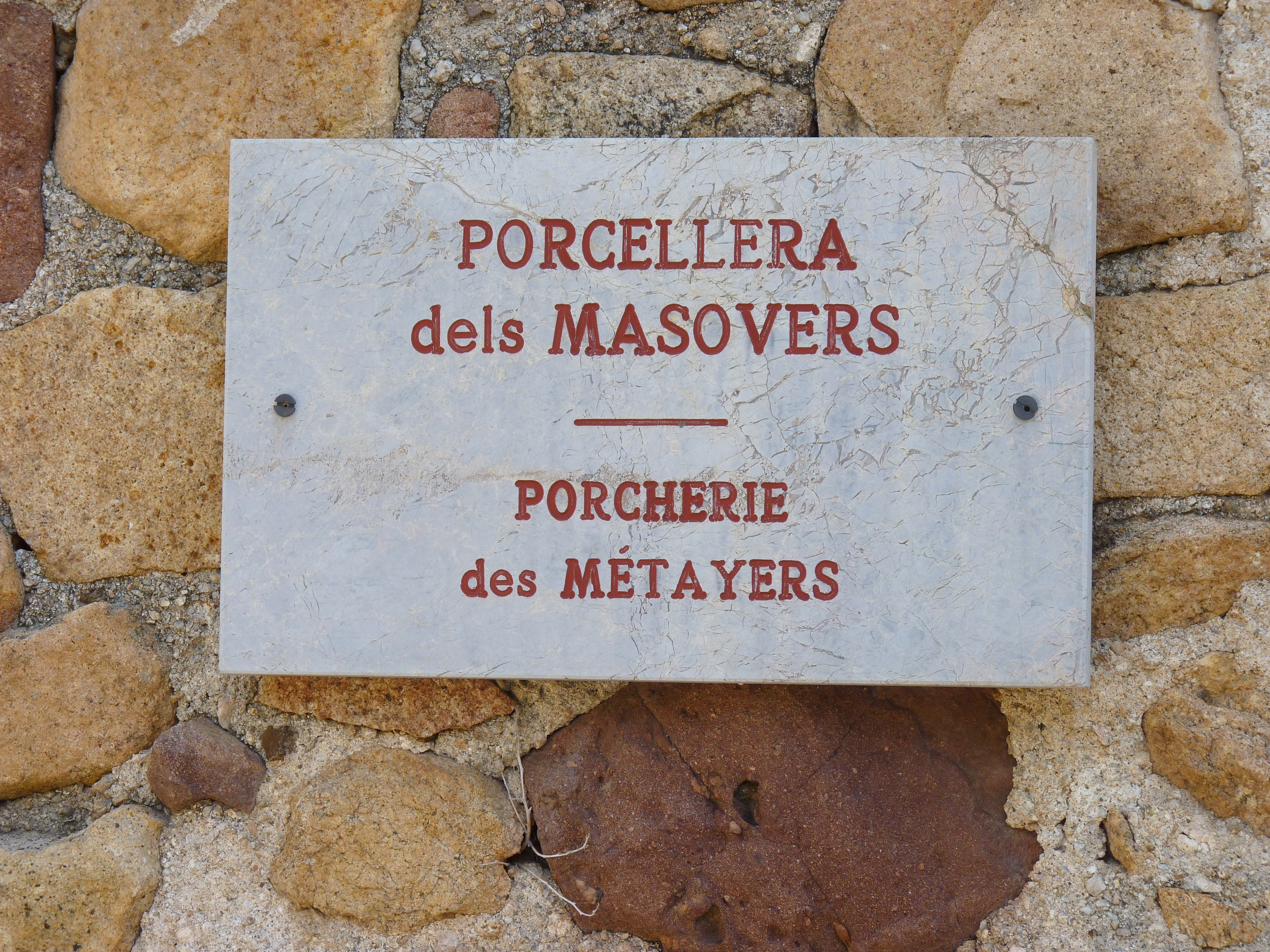
Typical street name plaque in Coustouges

== See also ==
- Communes of the Pyrénées-Orientales department
