= Py, Pyrénées-Orientales =

Py Pi de Conflent
- Commune
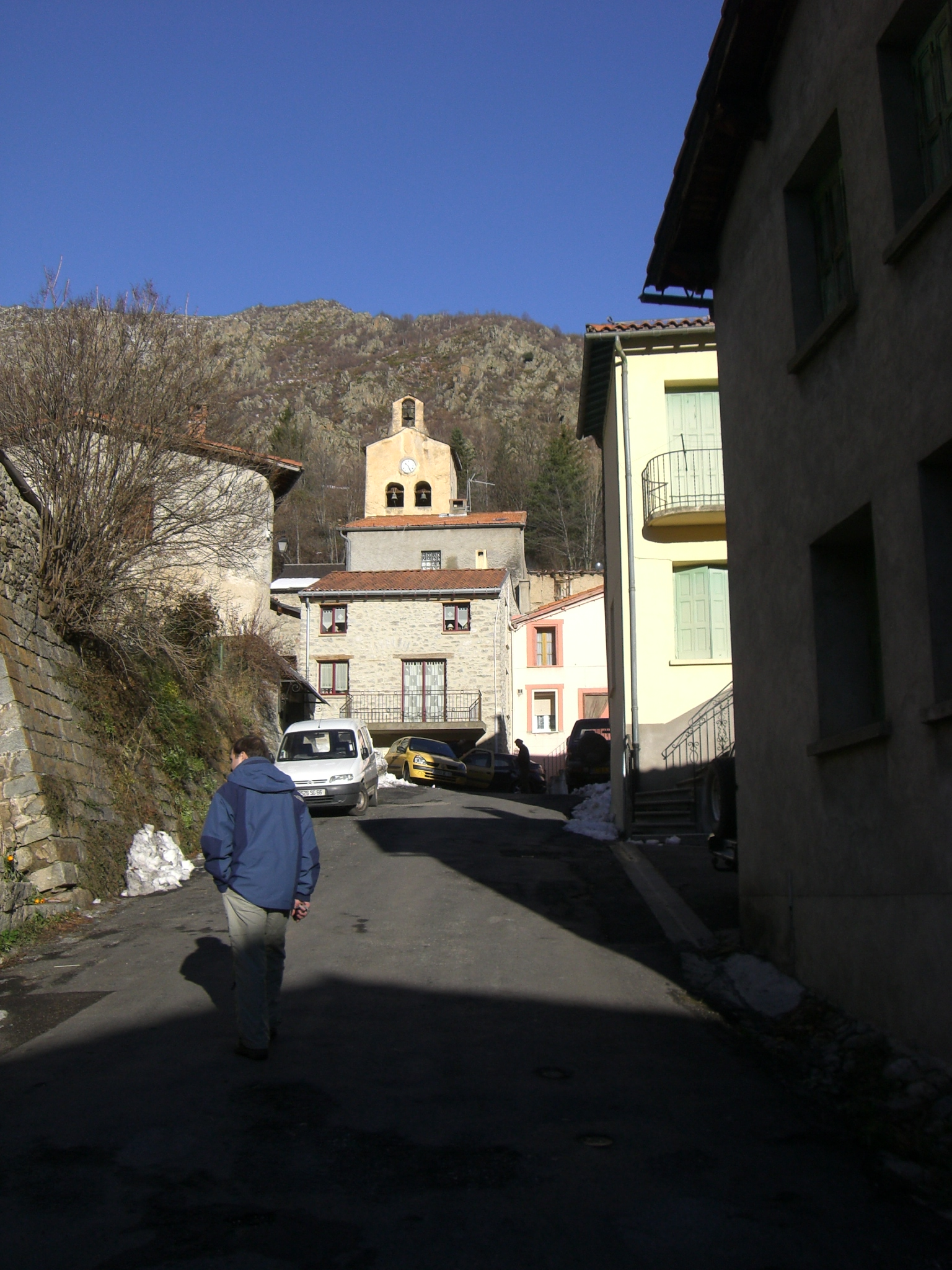
- A view within Py

- Coat of arms
- Location of Py
- Location within France Location within Occitanie
- Coordinates: 42°29′48″N 2°21′05″E
- Country: France
- Region: Occitania
- Department: Pyrénées-Orientales
- Arrondissement: Prades
- Canton: Le Canigou

Government
  - Mayor (2020–2026): Françoise Elliott
- Area^{1}: 50.86 km^{2} (19.64 sq mi)
- Elevation: 1,024 m (3,360 ft)
- Highest elevation: 2,442 m (8,012 ft)
- Lowest elevation: 880 m (2,890 ft)
- Population (2023): 83
  - Density: 1.6/km^{2} (4.2/sq mi)
- Time zone: UTC+01:00 (CET)
  - Summer (DST): UTC+02:00 (CEST)
- INSEE/Postal code: 66155 /66360
- ^{1} French Land Register data, which excludes lakes, ponds, glaciers > 1 km^{2} (0.386 sq mi or 247 acres) and river estuaries.

Py (French pronunciation: [pi]; Catalan: Pi de Conflent) is a commune in the Pyrénées-Orientales department in southern France.

== Geography ==
Py is in the canton of Le Canigou and in the arrondissement of Prades.

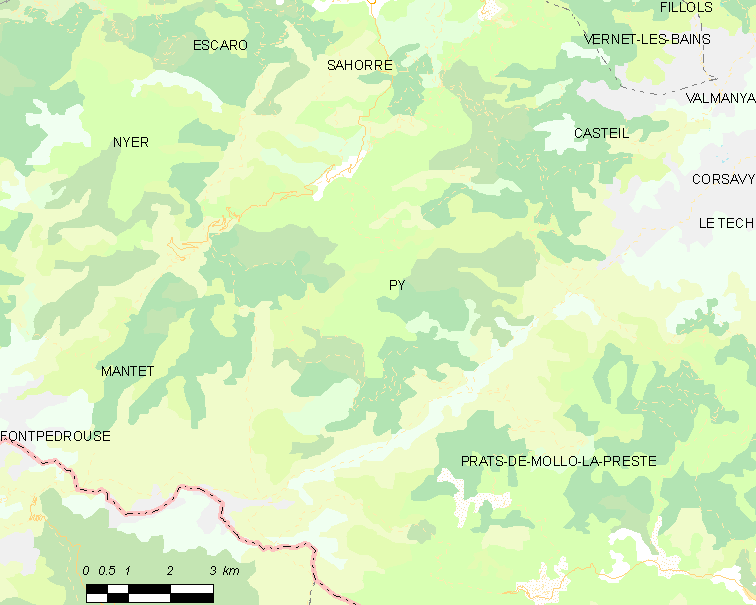
Map of Py and its surrounding communes

== Population ==
Historical population
Year	Pop.	±% p.a.
1968	113	—
1975	102	−1.45%
1982	95	−1.01%
1990	97	+0.26%
1999	107	+1.10%
2007	110	+0.35%
2012	91	−3.72%
2017	88	−0.67%
2023	83	−0.97%
Source: INSEE

== See also ==
- Communes of the Pyrénées-Orientales department
