= Mantet =

Mantet Mentet
- Commune
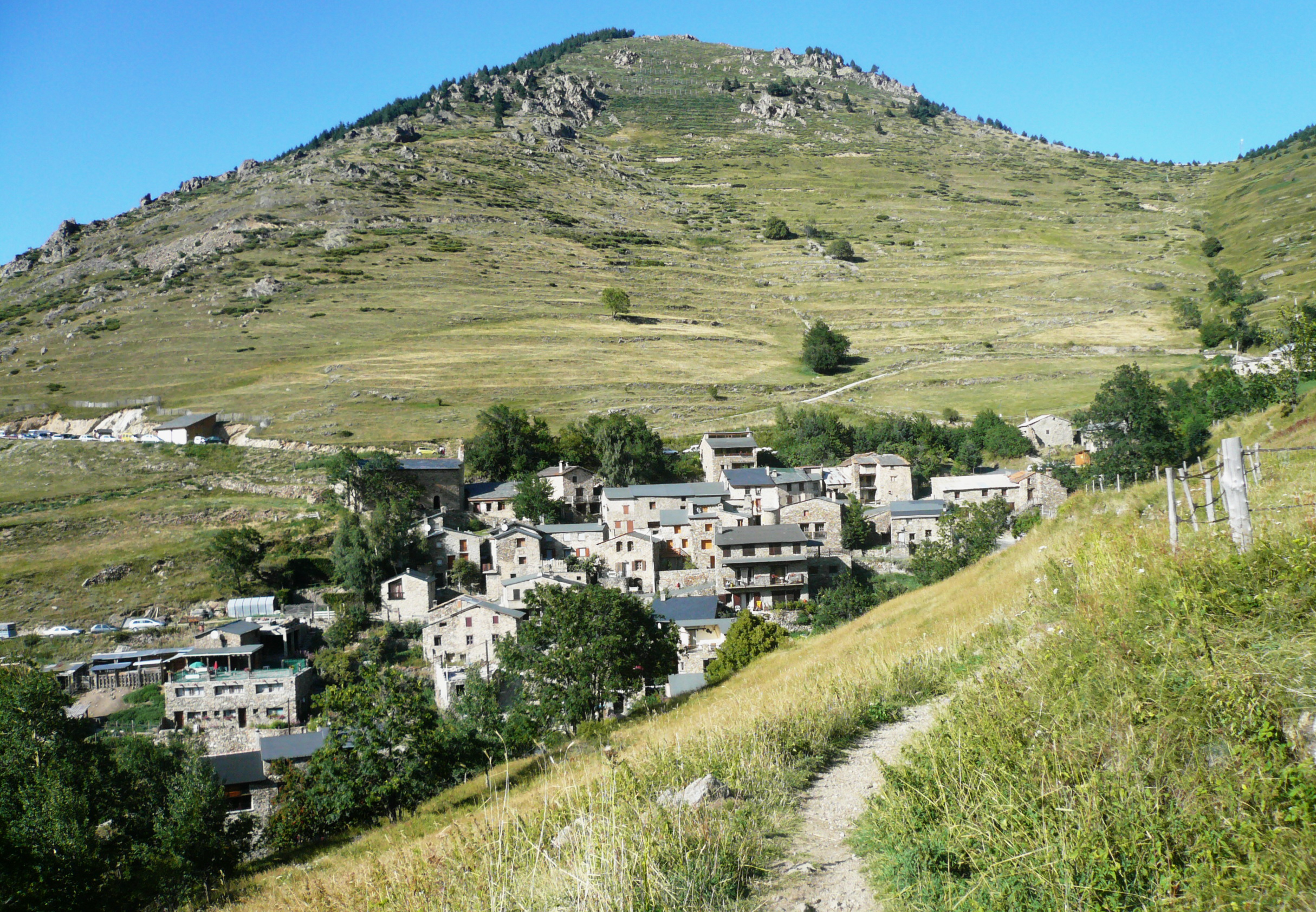
- A general view of Mantet

- Coat of arms
- Location of Mantet
- Location within France Location within Occitanie
- Coordinates: 42°28′41″N 2°18′28″E
- Country: France
- Region: Occitania
- Department: Pyrénées-Orientales
- Arrondissement: Prades
- Canton: Le Canigou

Government
  - Mayor (2020–2026): Jean-Luc Blaise
- Area^{1}: 32.15 km^{2} (12.41 sq mi)
- Elevation: 1,558 m (5,112 ft)
- Highest elevation: 2,688 m (8,819 ft)
- Lowest elevation: 1,381 m (4,531 ft)
- Population (2023): 35
  - Density: 1.1/km^{2} (2.8/sq mi)
- Time zone: UTC+01:00 (CET)
  - Summer (DST): UTC+02:00 (CEST)
- INSEE/Postal code: 66102 /66360
- ^{1} French Land Register data, which excludes lakes, ponds, glaciers > 1 km^{2} (0.386 sq mi or 247 acres) and river estuaries.

Mantet (Catalan: Mentet) is a commune in the Pyrénées-Orientales department in southern France.

== Geography ==
Mantet is located in the canton of Le Canigou and in the arrondissement of Prades.

The village of Mantet lies at an altitude of 1550 metres about 200 metres below the Col de Mantet. The GR 10 Pyrenean footpath passes through the village so it is one of the few points in the Pyrenees Orientales where hikers can buy provisions and spend the night in comfort.

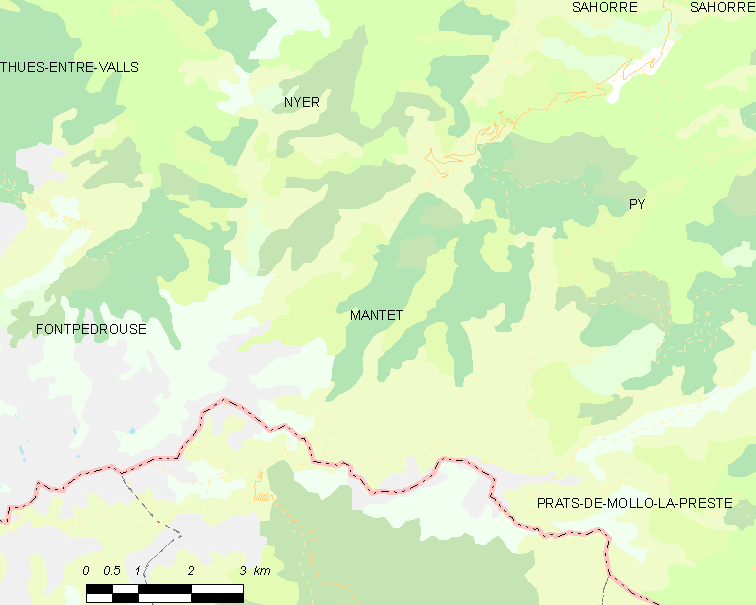
Map of Mantet and its surrounding communes

== Population ==
Historical population
Year	Pop.	±% p.a.
1968	4	—
1975	7	+8.32%
1982	23	+18.52%
1990	26	+1.54%
1999	17	−4.61%
2007	22	+3.28%
2012	31	+7.10%
2017	30	−0.65%
2023	35	+2.60%
Source: INSEE

== See also ==
- Communes of the Pyrénées-Orientales department
