= Fillols =

- Commune
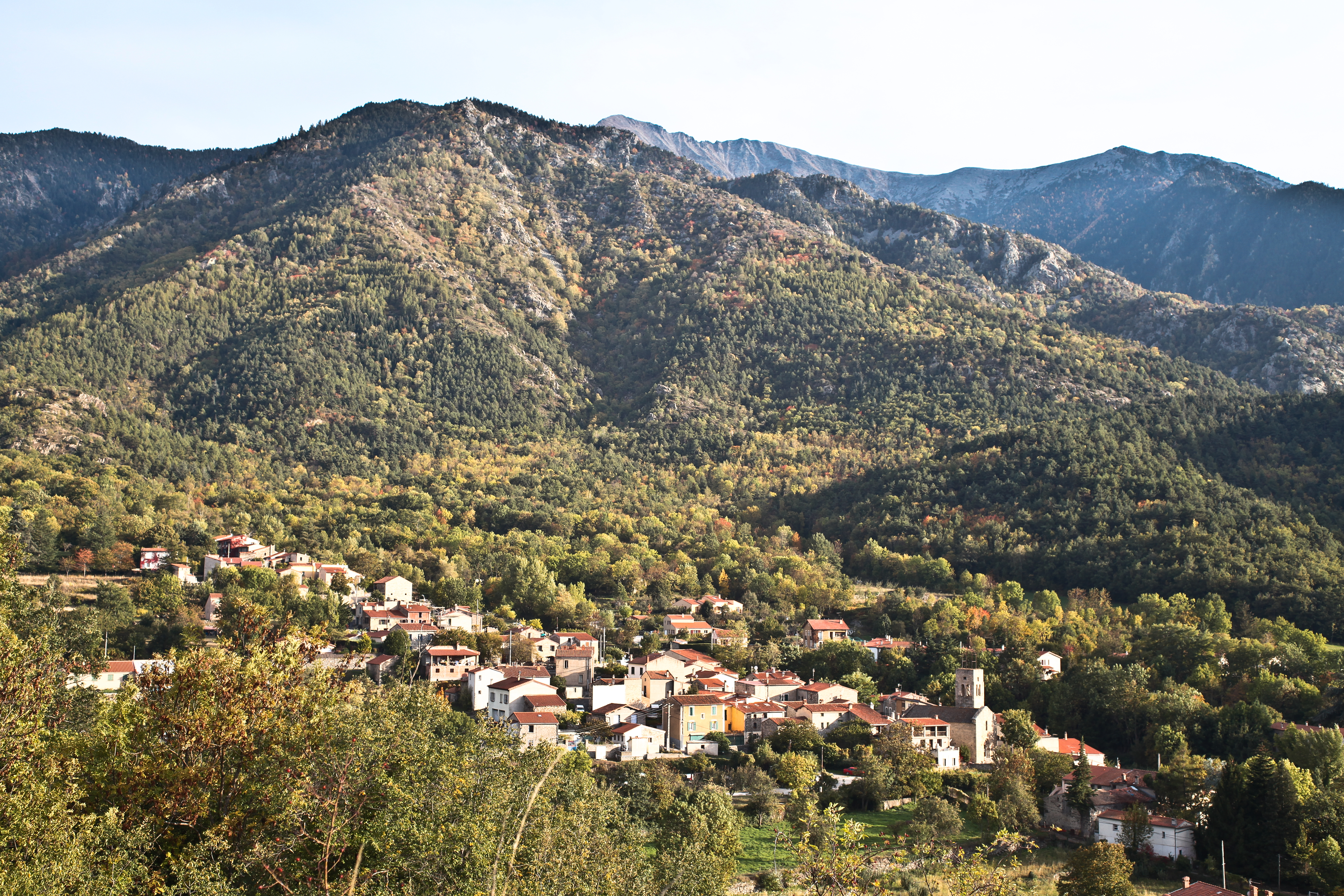
- A general view of Fillols
- Location of Fillols
- Location within France Location within Occitanie
- Coordinates: 42°33′43″N 2°24′37″E
- Country: France
- Region: Occitania
- Department: Pyrénées-Orientales
- Arrondissement: Prades
- Canton: Le Canigou

Government
  - Mayor (2020–2026): Claude Escape
- Area^{1}: 8.40 km^{2} (3.24 sq mi)
- Elevation: 650 m (2,130 ft)
- Highest elevation: 2,360 m (7,740 ft)
- Lowest elevation: 576 m (1,890 ft)
- Population (2023): 207
  - Density: 24.6/km^{2} (63.8/sq mi)
- Time zone: UTC+01:00 (CET)
  - Summer (DST): UTC+02:00 (CEST)
- INSEE/Postal code: 66078 /66820
- ^{1} French Land Register data, which excludes lakes, ponds, glaciers > 1 km^{2} (0.386 sq mi or 247 acres) and river estuaries.

Fillols (French pronunciation: [fijɔls]; Catalan: Fillols) is a commune in the Pyrénées-Orientales department in southern France.

== Geography ==
Fillols is located in the canton of Le Canigou and in the arrondissement of Prades.

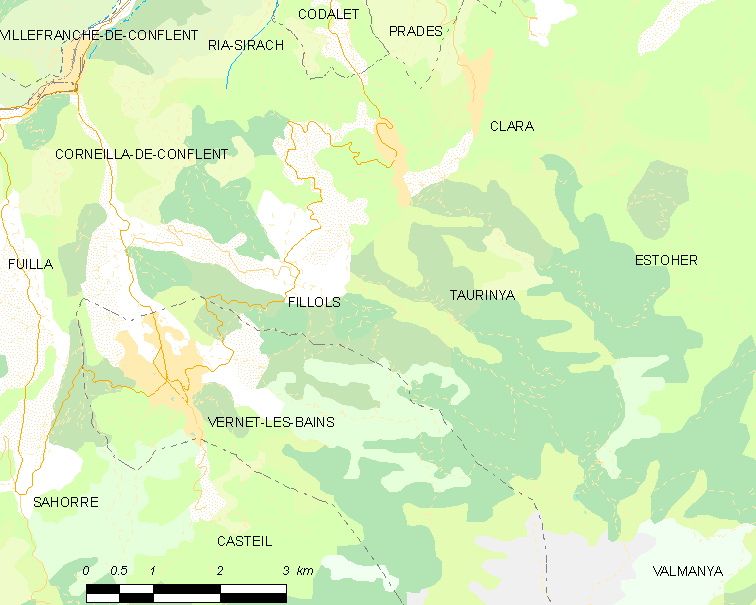
Map of Fillols and its surrounding communes

== Population ==
Historical population
Year	Pop.	±% p.a.
1968	187	—
1975	141	−3.95%
1982	163	+2.09%
1990	141	−1.80%
1999	141	+0.00%
2007	149	+0.69%
2012	169	+2.55%
2017	185	+1.83%
2023	207	+1.89%
Source: INSEE

== See also ==
- Communes of the Pyrénées-Orientales department
