= Taillet =

Taillet Tellet
- Commune
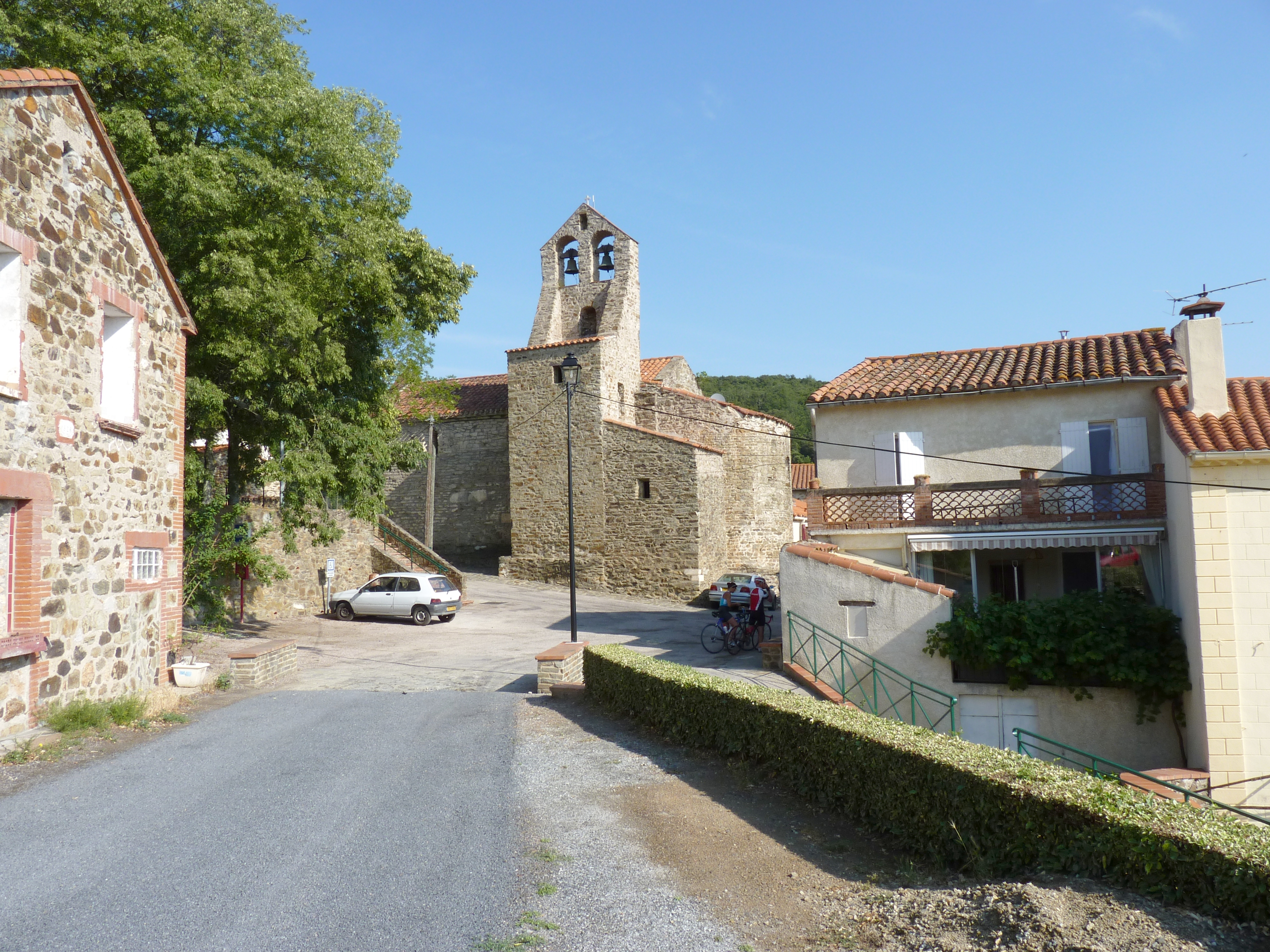
- The church in the village of Taillet

- Coat of arms
- Location of Taillet
- Location within France Location within Occitanie
- Coordinates: 42°31′41″N 2°40′22″E
- Country: France
- Region: Occitania
- Department: Pyrénées-Orientales
- Arrondissement: Céret
- Canton: Le Canigou

Government
  - Mayor (2020–2026): Alain Raymond
- Area^{1}: 10.02 km^{2} (3.87 sq mi)
- Elevation: 600 m (2,000 ft)
- Highest elevation: 681 m (2,234 ft)
- Lowest elevation: 198 m (650 ft)
- Population (2023): 105
  - Density: 10.5/km^{2} (27.1/sq mi)
- Time zone: UTC+01:00 (CET)
  - Summer (DST): UTC+02:00 (CEST)
- INSEE/Postal code: 66199 /66400
- ^{1} French Land Register data, which excludes lakes, ponds, glaciers > 1 km^{2} (0.386 sq mi or 247 acres) and river estuaries.

Taillet (Catalan: Tellet) is a commune in the Pyrénées-Orientales department in southern France.

== Geography ==
Taillet is located in the canton of Le Canigou and in the arrondissement of Céret.

The town is at the foot of the eastern end of the Pyrenees mountains, close to the border with the eastern tip of Spain, near the Mediterranean Sea. It mostly has lush forestland, some grazing land for animals and croplands.

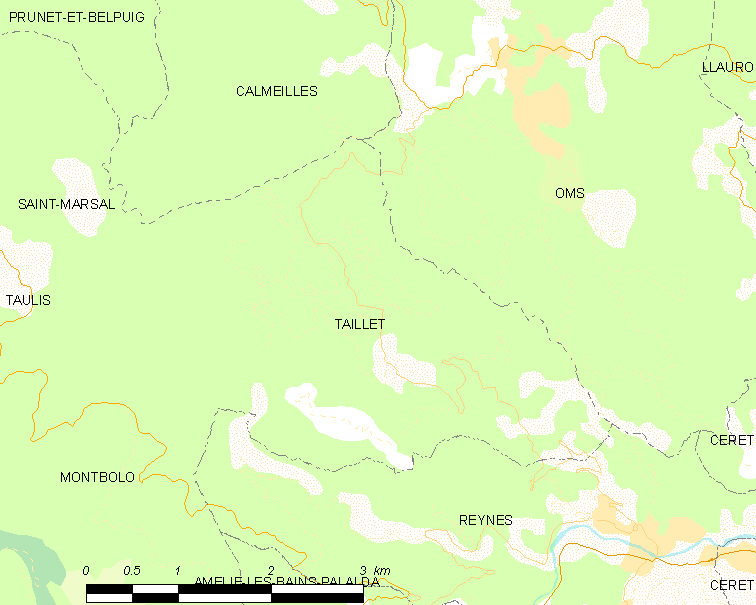
Map of Taillet and its surrounding communes

== Population ==
Historical population
Year	Pop.	±% p.a.
1968	56	—
1975	47	−2.47%
1982	52	+1.45%
1990	74	+4.51%
1999	83	+1.28%
2007	81	−0.30%
2012	126	+9.24%
2017	105	−3.58%
2023	105	+0.00%
Source: INSEE

== See also ==
- Communes of the Pyrénées-Orientales department
