= Estoher =

Estoher Estoer
- Commune
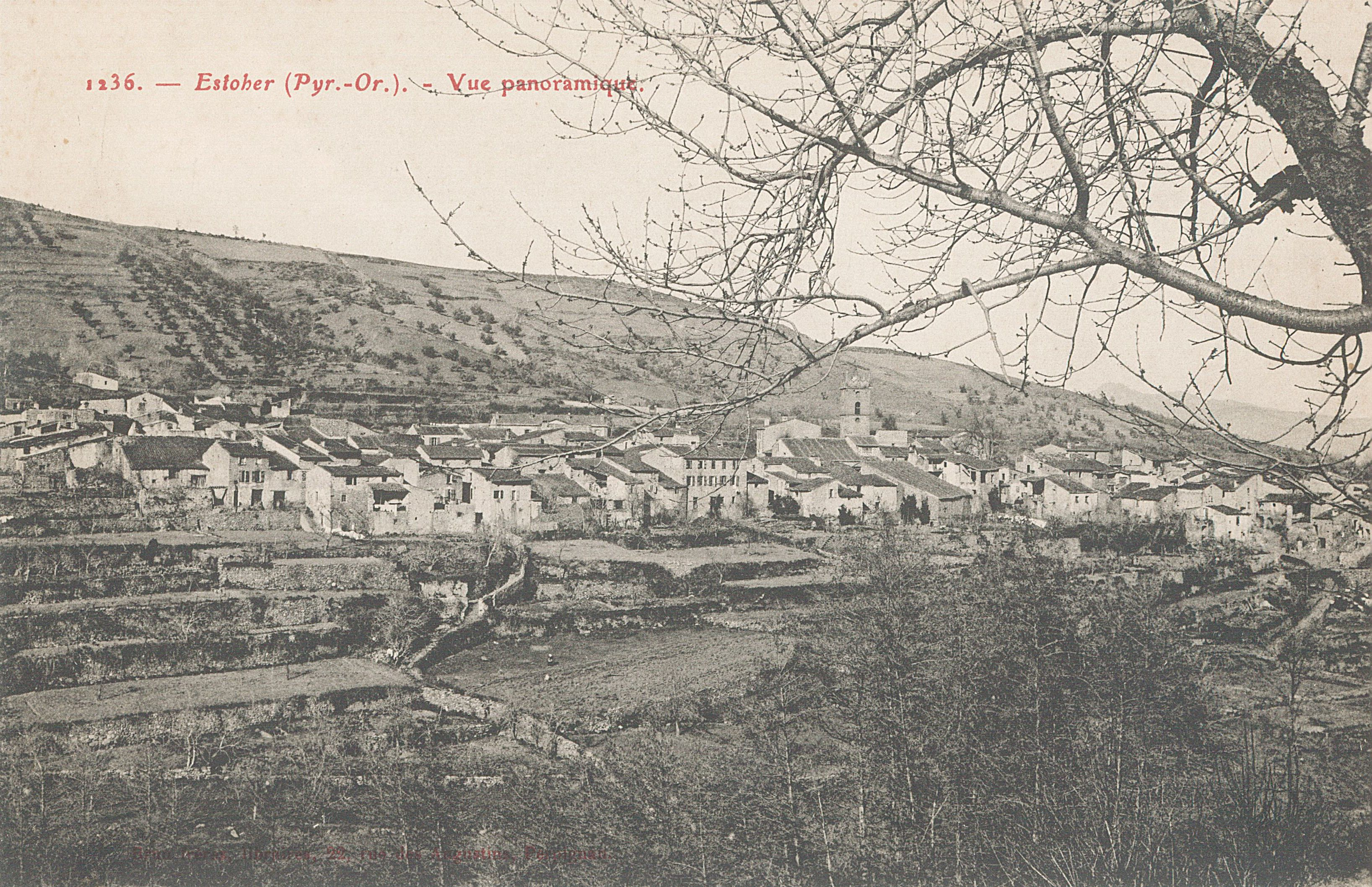
- A postcard view of Estoher, in the early 20th century

- Coat of arms
- Location of Estoher
- Location within France Location within Occitanie
- Coordinates: 42°36′06″N 2°29′13″E
- Country: France
- Region: Occitania
- Department: Pyrénées-Orientales
- Arrondissement: Prades
- Canton: Le Canigou
- Intercommunality: Conflent Canigó

Government
  - Mayor (2026–32): Erik Chatelus
- Area^{1}: 26.08 km^{2} (10.07 sq mi)
- Elevation: 360 m (1,180 ft)
- Highest elevation: 2,481 m (8,140 ft)
- Lowest elevation: 336 m (1,102 ft)
- Population (2023): 163
  - Density: 6.25/km^{2} (16.2/sq mi)
- Time zone: UTC+01:00 (CET)
  - Summer (DST): UTC+02:00 (CEST)
- INSEE/Postal code: 66073 /66320
- ^{1} French Land Register data, which excludes lakes, ponds, glaciers > 1 km^{2} (0.386 sq mi or 247 acres) and river estuaries.

Estoher (French pronunciation: [ɛstɔe]; Catalan: Estoer) is a commune in the Pyrénées-Orientales department in southern France.

== Geography ==
=== Localisation ===
Estoher is located in the canton of Le Canigou and in the arrondissement of Prades.

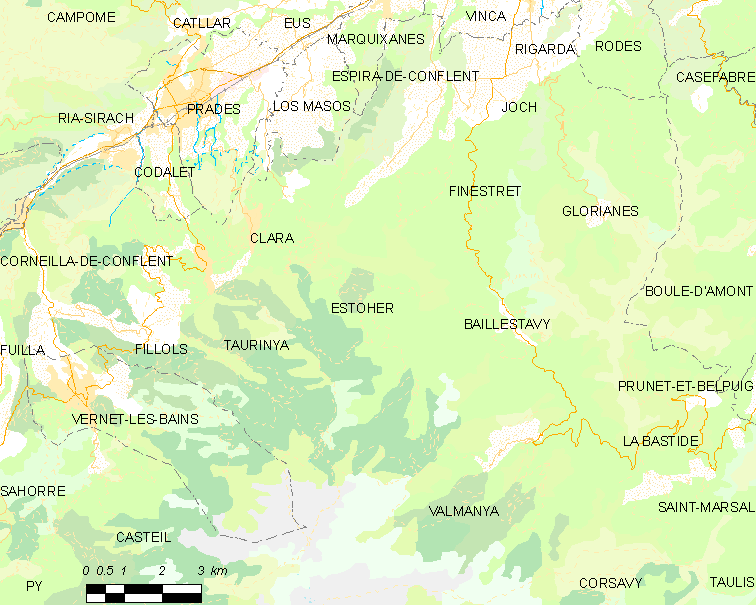
Map of Estoher and its surrounding communes

The village of Estoher is located in the lower part of the Llech valley.

== Population ==
Historical population
Year	Pop.	±% p.a.
1968	165	—
1975	127	−3.67%
1982	115	−1.41%
1990	124	+0.95%
1999	134	+0.87%
2007	154	+1.75%
2012	153	−0.13%
2017	145	−1.07%
2023	163	+1.97%
Source: INSEE

== See also ==
- Communes of the Pyrénées-Orientales department
