= Finestret =

- Commune
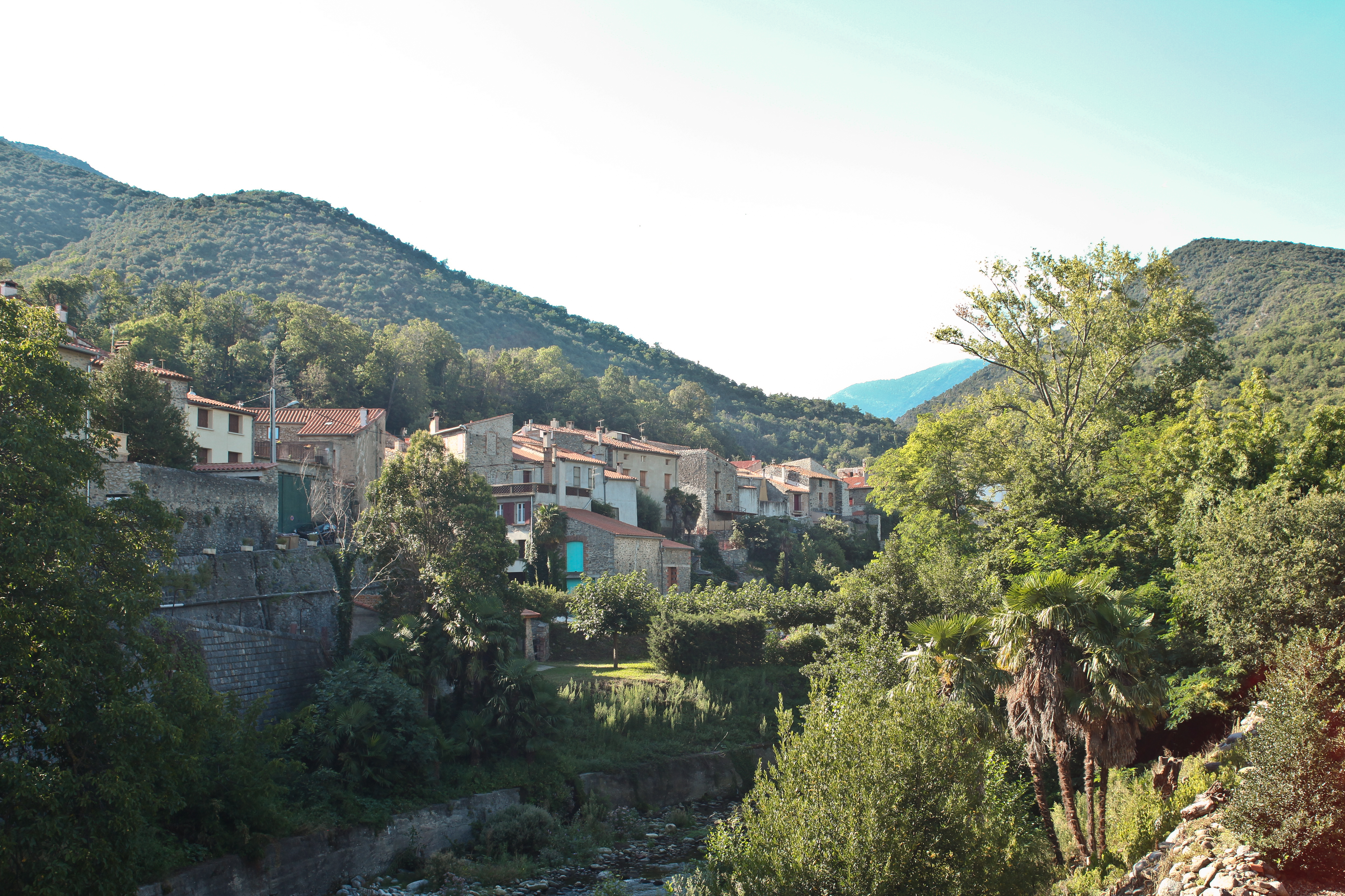
- A general view of Finestret
- Location of Finestret
- Location within France Location within Occitanie
- Coordinates: 42°37′01″N 2°30′43″E
- Country: France
- Region: Occitania
- Department: Pyrénées-Orientales
- Arrondissement: Prades
- Canton: Le Canigou

Government
  - Mayor (2020–2026): Stéphane Gilmant
- Area^{1}: 8.43 km^{2} (3.25 sq mi)
- Elevation: 330 m (1,080 ft)
- Highest elevation: 1,139 m (3,737 ft)
- Lowest elevation: 274 m (899 ft)
- Population (2023): 204
  - Density: 24.2/km^{2} (62.7/sq mi)
- Time zone: UTC+01:00 (CET)
  - Summer (DST): UTC+02:00 (CEST)
- INSEE/Postal code: 66079 /66320
- ^{1} French Land Register data, which excludes lakes, ponds, glaciers > 1 km^{2} (0.386 sq mi or 247 acres) and river estuaries.

Finestret (French pronunciation: [finɛstʁɛt]) is a commune in the Pyrénées-Orientales department in southern France.

== Geography ==
Finestret is located in the canton of Le Canigou and in the arrondissement of Prades.

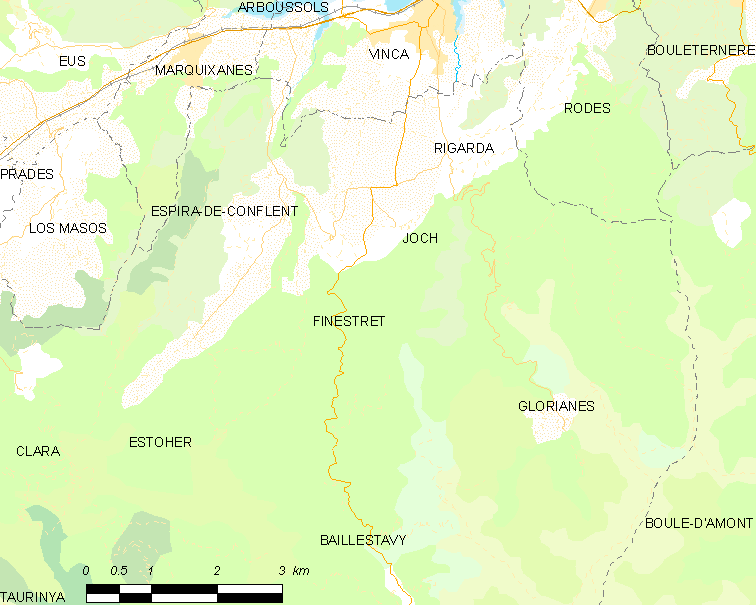
Map of Finestret and its surrounding communes

== Population ==
Historical population
Year	Pop.	±% p.a.
1968	196	—
1975	154	−3.39%
1982	143	−1.05%
1990	124	−1.77%
1999	135	+0.95%
2007	149	+1.24%
2012	199	+5.96%
2017	176	−2.43%
2023	204	+2.49%
Source: INSEE

== See also ==
- Communes of the Pyrénées-Orientales department
