= Serralongue =

- Commune
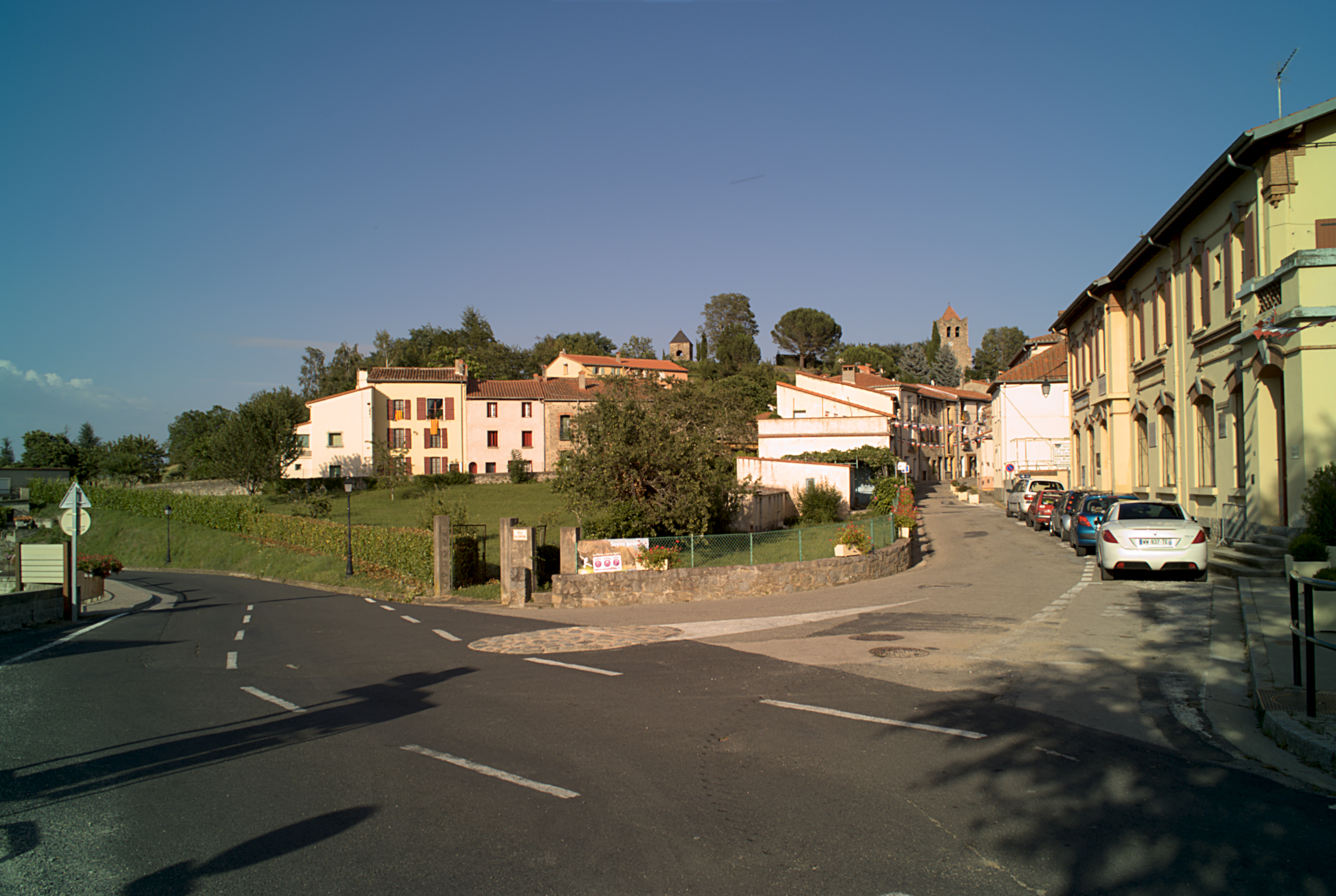
- The junction of Paul Santena road and Abdon Poggi road, in Serralongue

- Coat of arms
- Location of Serralongue
- Location within France Location within Occitanie
- Coordinates: 42°23′54″N 2°33′23″E
- Country: France
- Region: Occitania
- Department: Pyrénées-Orientales
- Arrondissement: Céret
- Canton: Le Canigou
- Intercommunality: Haut Vallespir

Government
  - Mayor (2020–2026): Philippe Juanola
- Area^{1}: 23.04 km^{2} (8.90 sq mi)
- Elevation: 714 m (2,343 ft)
- Highest elevation: 1,407 m (4,616 ft)
- Lowest elevation: 478 m (1,568 ft)
- Population (2023): 244
  - Density: 10.6/km^{2} (27.4/sq mi)
- Time zone: UTC+01:00 (CET)
  - Summer (DST): UTC+02:00 (CEST)
- INSEE/Postal code: 66194 /66230
- ^{1} French Land Register data, which excludes lakes, ponds, glaciers > 1 km^{2} (0.386 sq mi or 247 acres) and river estuaries.

Serralongue (French pronunciation: [sɛʁalɔ̃ɡ]; Catalan: Serrallonga) is a commune in the Pyrénées-Orientales department in southern France.

== Geography ==
Serralongue is located in the canton of Le Canigou and in the arrondissement of Céret.

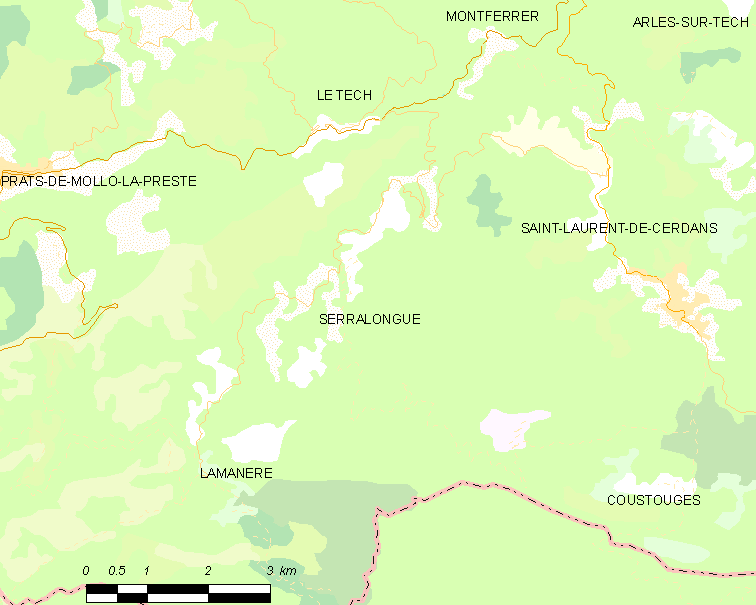
Map of Serralongue and its surrounding communes

== Population ==
Historical population
Year	Pop.	±% p.a.
1968	244	—
1975	206	−2.39%
1982	205	−0.07%
1990	210	+0.30%
1999	238	+1.40%
2007	258	+1.01%
2012	227	−2.53%
2017	226	−0.09%
2023	244	+1.29%
Source: INSEE

== See also ==
- Communes of the Pyrénées-Orientales department
