= La Bastide, Pyrénées-Orientales =

La Bastide La Bastida (Catalan)
- Commune
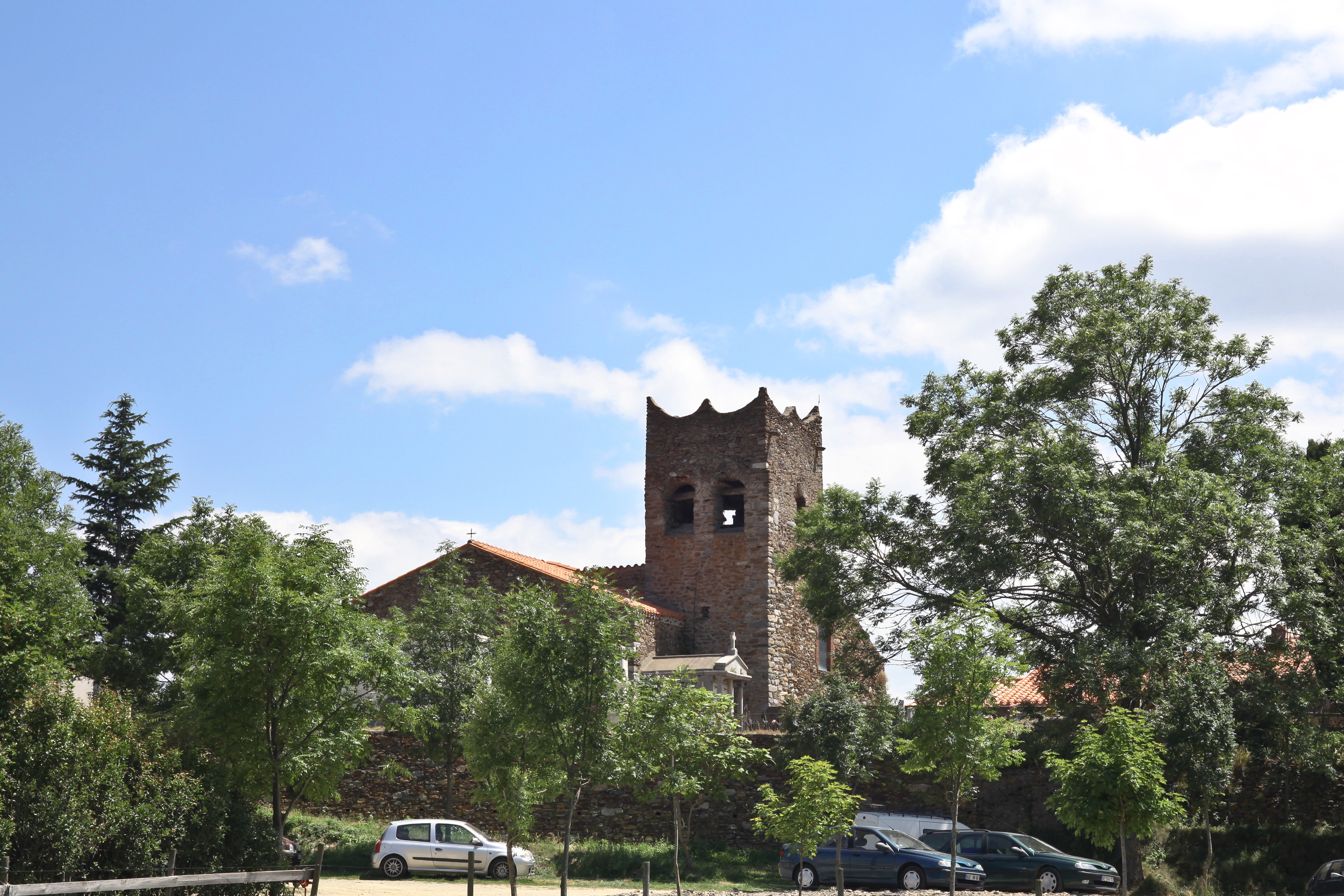
- The church in La Bastide
- Location of La Bastide
- Location within France Location within Occitanie
- Coordinates: 42°32′52″N 2°35′23″E
- Country: France
- Region: Occitania
- Department: Pyrénées-Orientales
- Arrondissement: Céret
- Canton: Le Canigou
- Intercommunality: Haut Vallespir

Government
  - Mayor (2020–2026): Daniel Baux
- Area^{1}: 15.63 km^{2} (6.03 sq mi)
- Elevation: 787 m (2,582 ft)
- Highest elevation: 1,780 m (5,840 ft)
- Lowest elevation: 545 m (1,788 ft)
- Population (2023): 60
  - Density: 3.8/km^{2} (9.9/sq mi)
- Demonym(s): bastidois (fr) bastidenc (ca)
- Time zone: UTC+01:00 (CET)
  - Summer (DST): UTC+02:00 (CEST)
- INSEE/Postal code: 66018 /66110
- ^{1} French Land Register data, which excludes lakes, ponds, glaciers > 1 km^{2} (0.386 sq mi or 247 acres) and river estuaries.

La Bastide (French pronunciation: [la bastid]; Catalan: La Bastida [ɫə bəsˈti.ðə]) is a commune in the Pyrénées-Orientales department in southern France.

== Geography ==
=== Localisation ===
La Bastide is located in the canton of Le Canigou and in the arrondissement of Céret.

It is part of the Northern Catalan comarca of Rosselló.

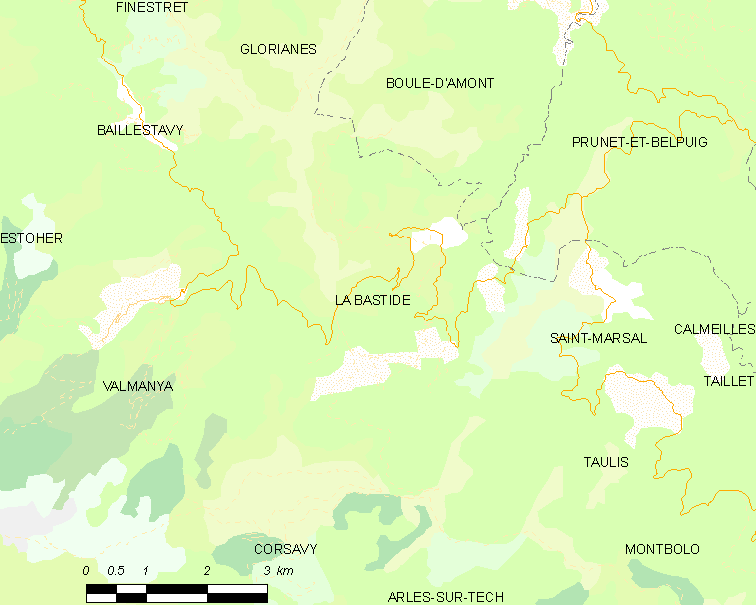
Map of La Bastide and its surrounding communes

== Government and politics ==
Mayors

Mayor	Term start	Term end
Daniel Baux	2001	

== Population ==
Historical population
Year	Pop.	±% p.a.
1968	80	—
1975	70	−1.89%
1982	65	−1.05%
1990	64	−0.19%
1999	61	−0.53%
2007	103	+6.77%
2012	80	−4.93%
2017	72	−2.09%
2023	60	−2.99%
Source: INSEE

== See also ==
- Communes of the Pyrénées-Orientales department
