= Montferrer =

- Commune
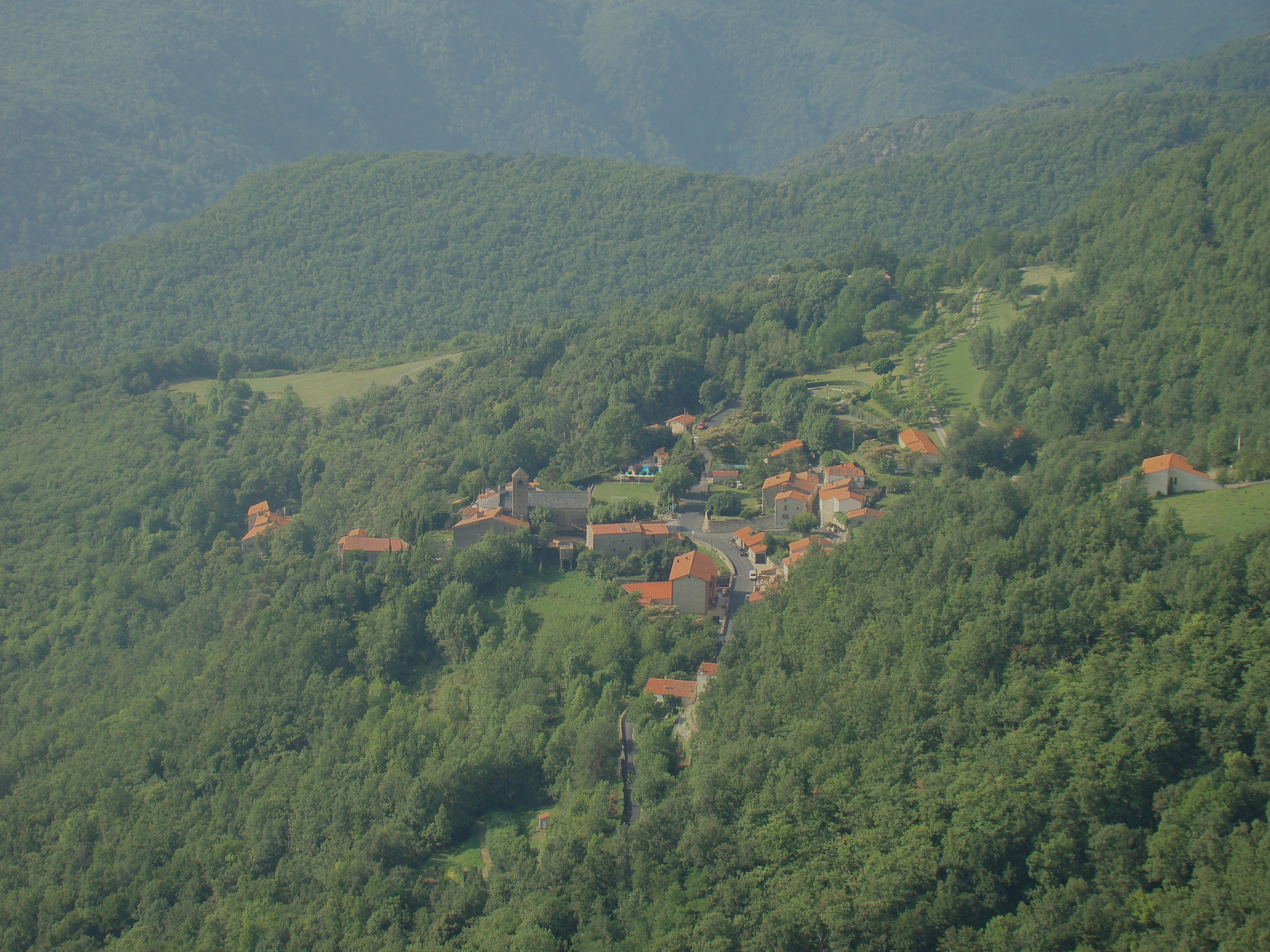
- A general view of Montferrer

- Coat of arms
- Location of Montferrer
- Location within France Location within Occitanie
- Coordinates: 42°26′20″N 2°34′05″E
- Country: France
- Region: Occitania
- Department: Pyrénées-Orientales
- Arrondissement: Céret
- Canton: Le Canigou
- Intercommunality: Haut Vallespir

Government
  - Mayor (2020–2026): Jean-Marie Gourgues
- Area^{1}: 21.95 km^{2} (8.47 sq mi)
- Elevation: 820 m (2,690 ft)
- Highest elevation: 1,608 m (5,276 ft)
- Lowest elevation: 308 m (1,010 ft)
- Population (2023): 218
  - Density: 9.93/km^{2} (25.7/sq mi)
- Time zone: UTC+01:00 (CET)
  - Summer (DST): UTC+02:00 (CEST)
- INSEE/Postal code: 66116 /66150
- ^{1} French Land Register data, which excludes lakes, ponds, glaciers > 1 km^{2} (0.386 sq mi or 247 acres) and river estuaries.

Montferrer (French pronunciation: [mɔ̃fɛʁe]) is a commune in the southern part of the Pyrénées-Orientales department in the Occitanie region of southern France. Its inhabitants are called Montferrerois. Historically and culturally, the commune is in the Vallespir, a former viscounty (incorporated in the Middle Ages into the viscounty of Castelnou), annexed to France by the Treaty of the Pyrenees (1659) and roughly corresponding to the Tech Valley from its source to Céret.

Exposed to a modified oceanic climate, it is drained by the Tech River, the Saint-Laurent River, the Fou River, and two other watercourses. The commune has a natural heritage: a Natura 2000 site ("le Tech") and a natural area of ecological interest, fauna, and flora.

Montferrer is a rural commune with 197 inhabitants in 2020, after reaching a population peak of 883 inhabitants in 1806. It is part of the Amélie-les-Bains-Palalda attraction area.

The Gorges de la Fou serve as the boundary between the communes of Montferrer and Corsavy. The location is particularly remarkable: over a length of about two kilometers, the gorges reach a depth of 250 meters, sometimes narrowing to not exceed the width of one meter between the two walls. Unfortunately, the gorges are currently off-limits to the public: between 300 and 600 cubic meters of rock have detached from the wall, making the visit to the site dangerous. According to a study, it would take between 18 and 24 million euros to restore the gorges.

== Geography ==
Montferrer is located in the canton of Le Canigou and in the arrondissement of Céret.

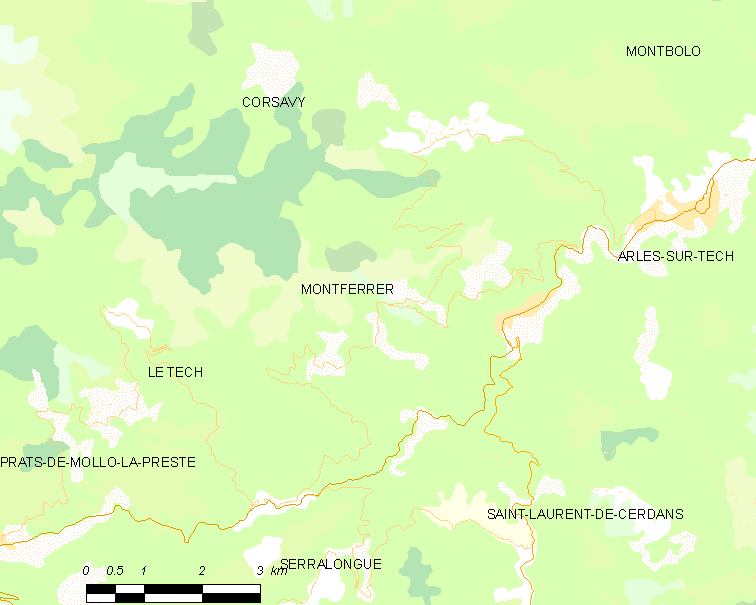
Map of Montferrer and its surrounding communes

The municipality of Montferrer is located in the department of Pyrénées-Orientales, in the Occitanie region.

It is situated 40 km as the crow flies from Perpignan, the prefecture of the department, 16 km from Céret, a sub-prefecture, and 10 km from Amélie-les-Bains-Palalda, the central office of the Canigou canton, to which the commune has been affiliated since 2015 for departmental elections. Additionally, the commune is part of the living area of Amélie-les-Bains-Palalda.

The closest municipalities are Corsavy (3.3 km), Le Tech (3.6 km), Serralongue (4.6 km), Arles-sur-Tech (5.9 km), Saint-Laurent-de-Cerdans (7.0 km), Prats-de-Mollo-la-Preste (8.2 km), Montbolo (8.9 km), Lamanère (9.5 km).

Historically and culturally, Montferrer is part of the Vallespir, a former viscounty (incorporated in the Middle Ages into the viscounty of Castelnou), annexed to France by the Treaty of the Pyrenees in 1659 and roughly corresponding to the Tech Valley from its source to Céret.

== Urbanism ==
=== Typology ===
Montferrer is a rural commune because it is classified among the sparsely populated or very sparsely populated communes, according to the municipal INSEE density grid.

Additionally, the commune is part of the attraction area of Amélie-les-Bains-Palalda, where it is considered a crown commune. This area, comprising 6 communes, falls into the category of areas with fewer than 50,000 inhabitants.

=== Land usage ===
Land use in the commune, as indicated by the European database of biophysical land cover, Corine Land Cover (CLC), is characterized by the significance of forests and semi-natural environments, accounting for 92.4% in 2018, an increase compared to 1990 (90.2%). The detailed distribution in 2018 is as follows: forests (74.3%), areas with shrub and/or herbaceous vegetation (18.1%), and heterogeneous agricultural areas (7.6%).

The evolution of land use in the commune and its infrastructures can be observed through various cartographic representations of the territory: the Cassini map (18th century), the state-major map (1820-1866), and the IGN aerial maps or photos for the current period (1950 to today).

=== Climate ===
In 2010, the climate of the commune is classified as an altered Mediterranean climate, according to a CNRS study based on data spanning the period 1971-2008. In 2020, Météo-France publishes a typology of climates in metropolitan France, placing the commune in a transitional zone between mountain and Mediterranean climates. It falls within the climatic region of Pyrénées Orientales, characterized by low precipitation, high sunshine hours (2,600 h/year), dry air, especially in winter, and few fogs.

For the period 1971-2000, the average annual temperature is 13 °C, with an annual temperature range of 14.2 °C. The average annual precipitation is 802 mm, with 5.6 days of precipitation in January and 5.7 days in July. For the period 1991-2020, the observed average annual temperature at the nearest weather station, located in the commune of Le Tech, 4 km as the crow flies, is 12.9 °C, and the average annual precipitation is 1,146.5 mm. For the future, climate parameters for the commune estimated for 2050 under different greenhouse gas emission scenarios can be found on a dedicated website published by Météo-France in November 2022.

== Natural Environments and Biodiversity ==
=== Natura 2000 Network ===
Natura 2000 site within the communal territory. The Natura 2000 network is a European ecological network of natural sites of ecological interest established based on habitat and bird directives. It consists of Special Conservation Areas (SCAs) and Special Protection Areas (SPAs). A Natura 2000 site has been designated in the commune under the habitat directive: "le Tech," covering an area of 1,467 ha. It hosts the Southern Barbel, which exhibits very high genetic variability throughout the Tech watershed. Additionally, the upper basin is inhabited by the Pyrenean Desman.

=== Natural Areas of Ecological Interest, Fauna, and Flora ===
Map of the ZNIEFF type 2 located in the commune. The inventory of Natural Areas of Ecological Interest, Fauna, and Flora (ZNIEFF) aims to cover the most interesting ecological areas, primarily to enhance knowledge of the national natural heritage and provide decision-makers with a tool to consider the environment in territorial planning.

A ZNIEFF of type 2 is listed in the commune: "le Vallespir" (47,344 ha), covering 18 communes in the department.

== Culture and society ==
=== Cultural Events and Festivities ===
| Event name | Date |
|---|---|
| Patron Saint Festival | August 15 |
| Municipal Festival | June 24 |

== Population ==
Its inhabitants are called Montferrerois or Montferreroises in French.

Historical population
| Year | Pop. | ±% p.a. |
|---|---|---|
| 1968 | 215 | — |
| 1975 | 260 | +2.75% |
| 1982 | 226 | −1.98% |
| 1990 | 353 | +5.73% |
| 1999 | 221 | −5.07% |
| 2007 | 202 | −1.12% |
| 2012 | 191 | −1.11% |
| 2017 | 188 | −0.32% |
| 2023 | 218 | +2.50% |
Source: INSEE

== Micro-economics ==
In 2018, the commune has 79 fiscal households, comprising 165 individuals. The median disposable income per consumption unit is €15,100 (€19,350 in the department).

== Macro-economics ==
In 2018, the population aged 15 to 64 in the commune is 116 individuals, among whom 64.7% are economically active (56.9% employed and 7.8% unemployed), and 35.3% are inactive. In 2018, the municipal unemployment rate (according to the census) for individuals aged 15 to 64 is lower than that of France and the department, whereas in 2008, the situation was reversed.

The commune is part of the surrounding area of the attraction zone of Amélie-les-Bains-Palalda, as at least 15% of the economically active population works in the hub. It has 26 jobs in 2018, compared to 25 in 2013 and 30 in 2008. The number of economically active individuals residing in the commune is 67, indicating an employment concentration indicator of 38.7% and an activity rate among those aged 15 and over of 46.3%.

Of these 67 individuals aged 15 or older with employment, 21 work in the commune, accounting for 31% of the residents. For commuting to work, 88.1% of the residents use a personal or company four-wheeled vehicle, 4.5% use two-wheelers, bicycles, or walk, and 7.5% do not need transportation (work from home).

=== Non-agricultural Activities ===
Business Sectors: As of December 31, 2019, there are 18 establishments in Montferrer. The sector of wholesale and retail trade, transportation, accommodation, and catering is predominant in the commune, representing 33.3% of the total number of establishments (6 out of the 18 businesses in Montferrer), compared to 30.5% at the departmental level.

=== Agriculture ===
The commune is in the "Vallespir et Albères," a small agricultural region located in the southern part of the Pyrénées-Orientales department. In 2020, the technical and economic orientation of agriculture in the commune is pig farming. Five agricultural holdings with their headquarters in the commune were counted in the 2020 agricultural census (eight in 1988). The utilized agricultural area is 213 ha.

== Politics and Administration ==
=== Cantonese ===
The municipality of Montferrer was included in the Prats-de-Mollo canton in 1790. It was transferred to the Arles canton in 1793, to which it continued to belong until the disappearance of this canton in 2015. Since the elections following the 2014 reform, it has been part of the Canigou canton.

=== Mayors ===
| Start | End | Name | Political Party |
| 1791 | | 1794 | | M. Jean JANOTET | | |
| 1794 | | 1796 | | M. Joseph VAILLS | | |
| 1796 | | 1798 | | M. André MALET | | |
| 1798 | | Élu | | M. Jean SOLA | | |
| 1798 | | 1799 | | M. Jean-Pierre GALY | | |
| 1799 | | 1810 | | M. Jean COLL | | |
| 1810 | | 1847 | | M. Joseph GALANGAU | | |
| 1847 | | 1870 | | M. Jean FIGUÈRES | | |
| 1870 | | 1871 | | M. Damien CUFFI-SOBRAQUÈS | | |
| 1871 | | 1881 | | M. Jean GALANGAU | | |
| 1881 | | 1884 | | M. Augustin VALLS | | |
| 1884 | | 1886 | | M. Jean GALANGAU | | |
| 1886 | | 1888 | | M. Paul DESSORS | | |
| 1888 | | 1896 | | M. Jean GALANGAU | | |
| 1896 | | 1917 | | M. Joseph SOBRAQUÈS | | |
| 1917 | | 1934 | | M. Jean RAMON | | |
| 1934 | | 1944 | | M. Joseph VALLS | | |
| 1944 | | 1947 | | M. Jean COSTE | | |
| 1947 | | 1958 | | Abdon FIGUÈRES | | |
| 1958 | | 1959 | | M. Jean COSTE | | |
| 1959 | | 1965 | | M. André SAQUER | | |
| 1965 | | 1971 | | M. Henry DOUZON | | |
| 1971 | | 1977 | | M. Pierre VALLS | | |
| 1977 | | 1983 | | M. Raymond DENAMIEL | | |
| 1983 | | 2008 | | Mme Madeleine DENAMIEL | | RPR |
| 2008 | | 2013 | | M. Paul BAUDEN | | |
| 2013 | | 2020 | Dominique PETIT | | |
| 2020 | Incumbent | M. Jean-Marie GOURGUES | Ind. |

== Local Culture and Heritage ==
=== Monuments and Tourist Sites ===
- The Sainte-Marie Church of Montferrer (Historical Monument - Classified MH in 1922) is dedicated to the Virgin of the Assumption. With a single nave and a semicircular apse, it was built between the 11th and 13th centuries, using all or part of a previous structure from the 10th century. The portal, with a multi-archivolt, is supported by two columns with marble capitals. The bell tower is adorned with twin windows on two levels. The church houses a 14th-century sarcophagus (Dalmau II de Castelnou, his wife Béatrix, and their son Père), some pieces of goldsmithing, as well as the altarpiece of the main altar (18th century). Several of its items are referenced in the Palissy database.

- There is also a fountain dedicated to Sainte-Marie, located near the church.

- The Saint-Luc Church.

=== Lore ===
En 1674, Charles de Banyuls de Montferrer, the eldest son of Thomas II de Banyuls de Montferrer, leads the Villefranche conspiracy. The plot is uncovered, and Charles manages to escape to Barcelona, while he is sentenced to death in absentia. In retaliation, the Mollet Castle is demolished under the supervision of Vauban to prevent it from serving as a refuge for potential rebels.

== Newspaper ==
Montferrer has a newspaper, run by the town hall, published once per year, called the Bulletin municipal. The newspaper covers a range of topics, such as births, deaths, and in some cases obtention of diplomas or certificates from residents. The newspaper also talks about new laws and regulation and changes to current ones.

The bulletin begins with a foreword from the mayor. Followed by information such as what is happening to municipal buildings and infrastructure.

The last part of the bulletin are a series of scanned newspaper clippings related to montferrer.

== See also ==
- Communes of the Pyrénées-Orientales department
