= Canton of Le Canigou =

Coordinates: 42.48°N 2.67°E

The canton of Le Canigou is an administrative division of the Pyrénées-Orientales department, in southern France. It was created at the French canton reorganisation which came into effect in March 2015. Its seat is in Amélie-les-Bains-Palalda.

It consists of the following communes:

1. Amélie-les-Bains-Palalda
2. Arles-sur-Tech
3. Baillestavy
4. La Bastide
5. Boule-d'Amont
6. Bouleternère
7. Casefabre
8. Casteil
9. Corneilla-de-Conflent
10. Corsavy
11. Coustouges
12. Espira-de-Conflent
13. Estoher
14. Fillols
15. Finestret
16. Fuilla
17. Glorianes
18. Joch
19. Lamanère
20. Mantet
21. Marquixanes
22. Montbolo
23. Montferrer
24. Prats-de-Mollo-la-Preste
25. Prunet-et-Belpuig
26. Py
27. Reynès
28. Rigarda
29. Rodès
30. Sahorre
31. Saint-Laurent-de-Cerdans
32. Saint-Marsal
33. Saint-Michel-de-Llotes
34. Serralongue
35. Taillet
36. Taulis
37. Taurinya
38. Le Tech
39. Valmanya
40. Vernet-les-Bains
41. Vinça
