= Baillestavy =

Baillestavy Vallestàvia
- Commune
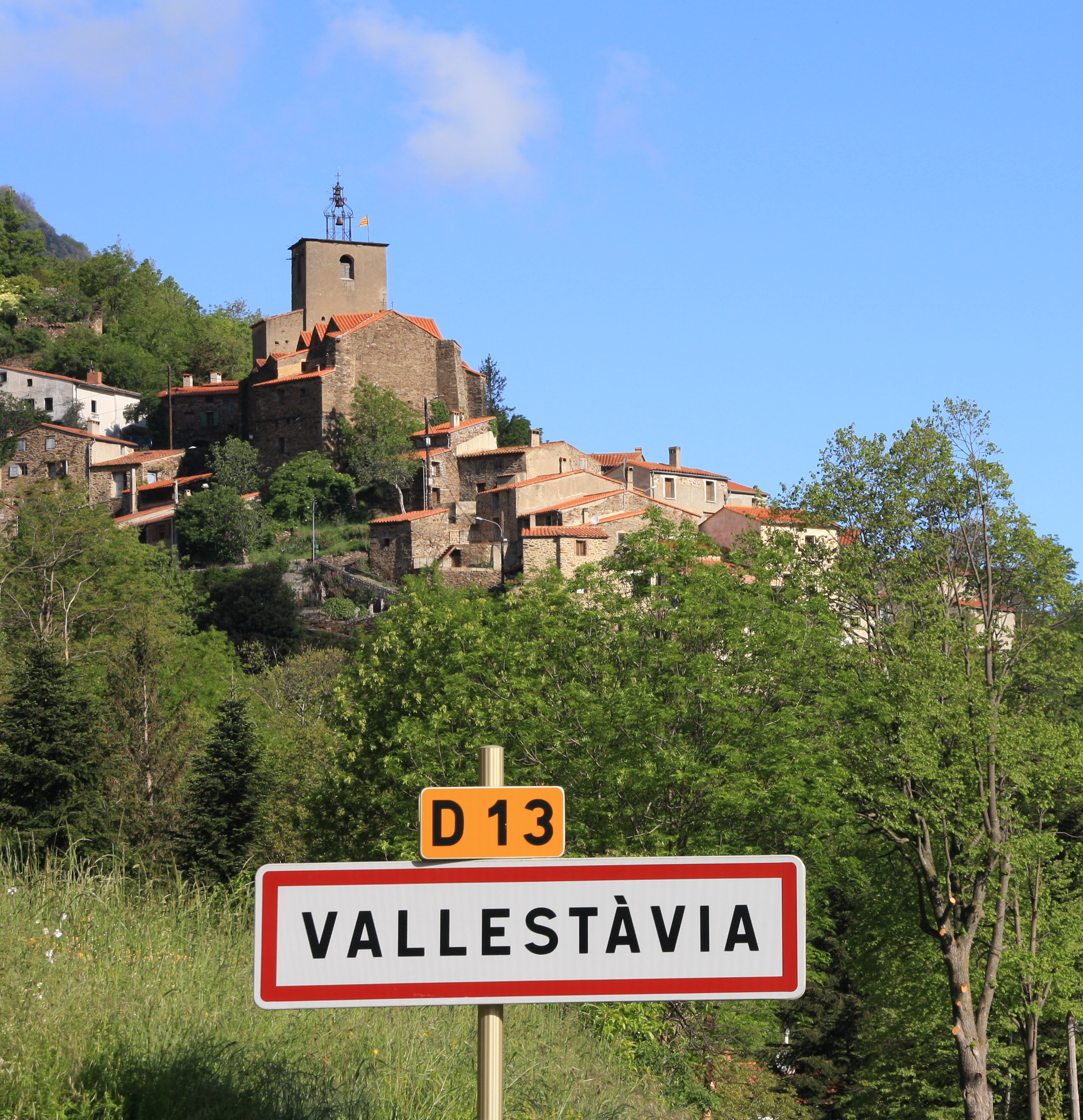
- Baillestavy

- Coat of arms
- Location of Baillestavy
- Location within France Location within Occitanie
- Coordinates: 42°33′56″N 2°31′33″E
- Country: France
- Region: Occitania
- Department: Pyrénées-Orientales
- Arrondissement: Prades
- Canton: Le Canigou
- Intercommunality: Conflent-Canigó

Government
  - Mayor (2020–2026): Éric Mahieux
- Area^{1}: 17.89 km^{2} (6.91 sq mi)
- Elevation: 585 m (1,919 ft)
- Highest elevation: 1,720 m (5,640 ft)
- Lowest elevation: 468 m (1,535 ft)
- Population (2023): 112
  - Density: 6.26/km^{2} (16.2/sq mi)
- Time zone: UTC+01:00 (CET)
  - Summer (DST): UTC+02:00 (CEST)
- INSEE/Postal code: 66013 /66320
- ^{1} French Land Register data, which excludes lakes, ponds, glaciers > 1 km^{2} (0.386 sq mi or 247 acres) and river estuaries.

Baillestavy (French: [bajəstavi]; Catalan: Vallestàvia) is a commune in the Pyrénées-Orientales department in southern France.

== Geography ==
=== Localisation ===
Baillestavy is located in the canton of Le Canigou and in the arrondissement of Prades.

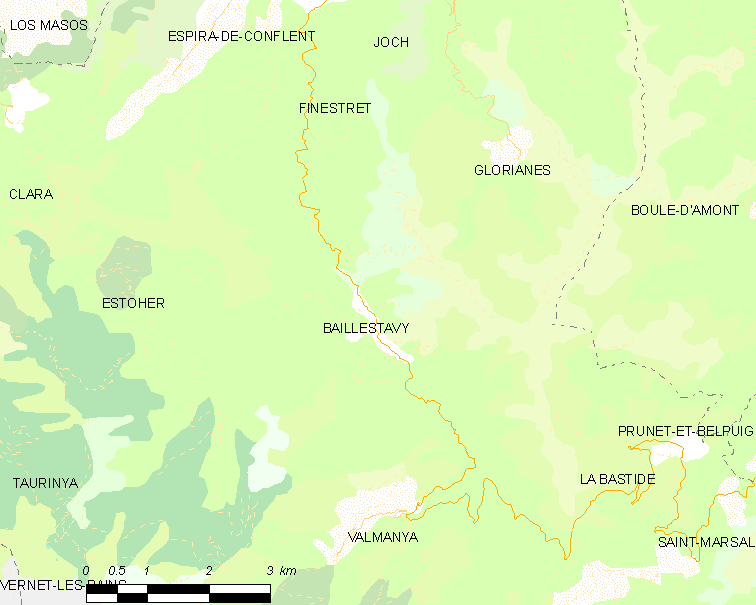
Map of Baillestavy and its surrounding communes

=== Hydrography ===
Baillestavy is crossed by the Lentillà river, a tributary of the Tech.

== Government and politics ==
=== Mayors ===
Mayor	Term start	Term end
Joseph Carboneill	1815	?
Jean Guerre	193?	1959
Remy Maler	1959	1971
Alain Taurinya	1971	1989
Claude Maynéris	1989	2001
Jacques Taurinya	2001	2020
Éric Mahieux	2020	incumbent

== Population ==
Historical population
Year	Pop.	±% p.a.
1968	54	—
1975	55	+0.26%
1982	50	−1.35%
1990	53	+0.73%
1999	58	+1.01%
2007	90	+5.65%
2012	103	+2.74%
2017	115	+2.23%
2023	112	−0.44%
Source: INSEE

== See also ==
- Communes of the Pyrénées-Orientales department
