= Marquixanes =

- Commune
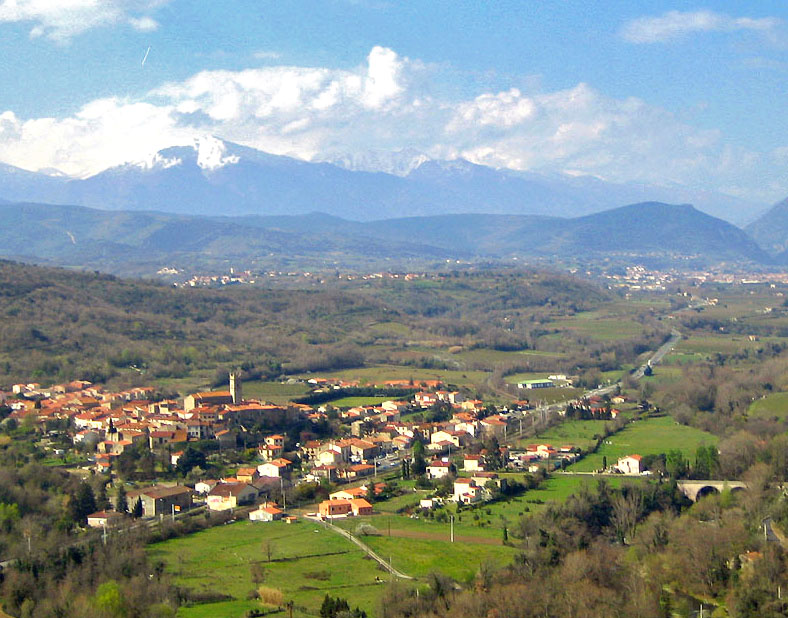
- A general view of Marquixanes

- Coat of arms
- Location of Marquixanes
- Location within France Location within Occitanie
- Coordinates: 42°38′34″N 2°29′11″E
- Country: France
- Region: Occitania
- Department: Pyrénées-Orientales
- Arrondissement: Prades
- Canton: Le Canigou
- Intercommunality: Conflent-Canigó

Government
  - Mayor (2022–2026): Jacques Vanelle
- Area^{1}: 4.80 km^{2} (1.85 sq mi)
- Elevation: 267 m (876 ft)
- Highest elevation: 568 m (1,864 ft)
- Lowest elevation: 244 m (801 ft)
- Population (2023): 599
  - Density: 125/km^{2} (323/sq mi)
- Time zone: UTC+01:00 (CET)
  - Summer (DST): UTC+02:00 (CEST)
- INSEE/Postal code: 66103 /66320
- ^{1} French Land Register data, which excludes lakes, ponds, glaciers > 1 km^{2} (0.386 sq mi or 247 acres) and river estuaries.

Marquixanes (French pronunciation: [maʁkiʃan]; Catalan: Marqueixanes) is a commune in the Pyrénées-Orientales department in southern France.

== Geography ==
Marquixanes is located in the canton of Le Canigou and in the arrondissement of Prades.

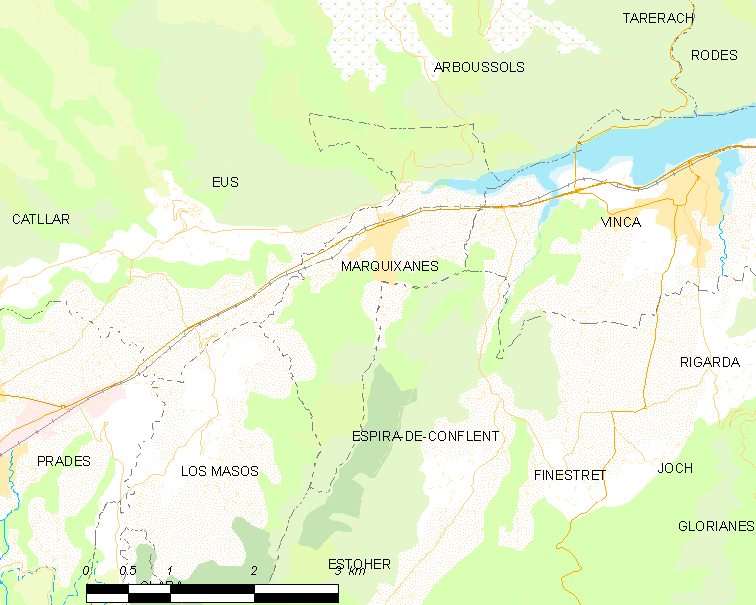
Map of Marquixanes and its surrounding communes

== Population ==
Historical population
Year	Pop.	±% p.a.
1968	363	—
1975	333	−1.22%
1982	307	−1.15%
1990	299	−0.33%
1999	397	+3.20%
2007	532	+3.73%
2012	548	+0.59%
2017	555	+0.25%
2023	599	+1.28%
Source: INSEE

== See also ==
- Communes of the Pyrénées-Orientales department
