= Glorianes =

- Commune
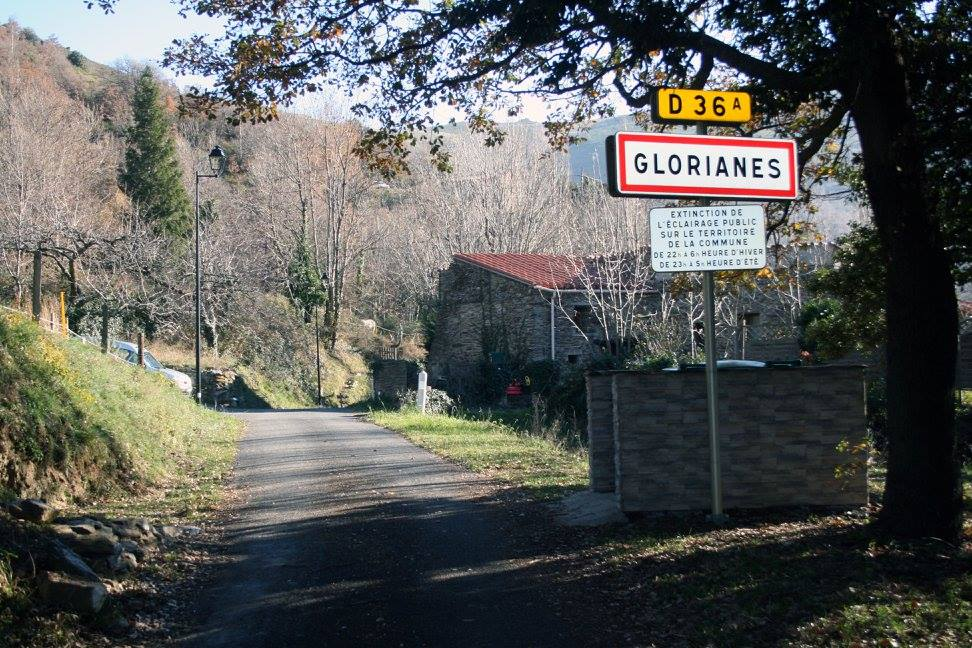
- The city limit sign in Glorianes
- Location of Glorianes
- Location within France Location within Occitanie
- Coordinates: 42°35′29″N 2°33′18″E
- Country: France
- Region: Occitania
- Department: Pyrénées-Orientales
- Arrondissement: Prades
- Canton: Le Canigou

Government
  - Mayor (2020–2026): Céline Dragué
- Area^{1}: 18.72 km^{2} (7.23 sq mi)
- Elevation: 793 m (2,602 ft)
- Highest elevation: 1,348 m (4,423 ft)
- Lowest elevation: 320 m (1,050 ft)
- Population (2023): 15
  - Density: 0.80/km^{2} (2.1/sq mi)
- Time zone: UTC+01:00 (CET)
  - Summer (DST): UTC+02:00 (CEST)
- INSEE/Postal code: 66086 /66320
- ^{1} French Land Register data, which excludes lakes, ponds, glaciers > 1 km^{2} (0.386 sq mi or 247 acres) and river estuaries.

Glorianes (French pronunciation: [ɡlɔʁjan]) is a commune in the Pyrénées-Orientales department in southern France.

== Geography ==
Glorianes is located in the canton of Le Canigou and in the arrondissement of Prades.

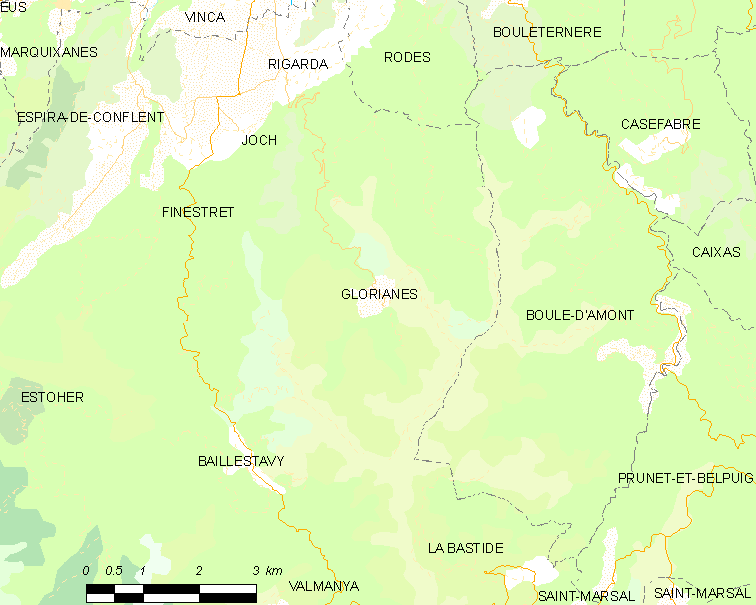
Map of Glorianes and its surrounding communes

== Population ==
Historical population
Year	Pop.	±% p.a.
1968	7	—
1975	8	+1.93%
1982	13	+7.18%
1990	20	+5.53%
1999	23	+1.57%
2007	20	−1.73%
2012	17	−3.20%
2017	25	+8.02%
2023	15	−8.16%
Source: INSEE

== See also ==
- Communes of the Pyrénées-Orientales department
