= Valmanya =

- Commune
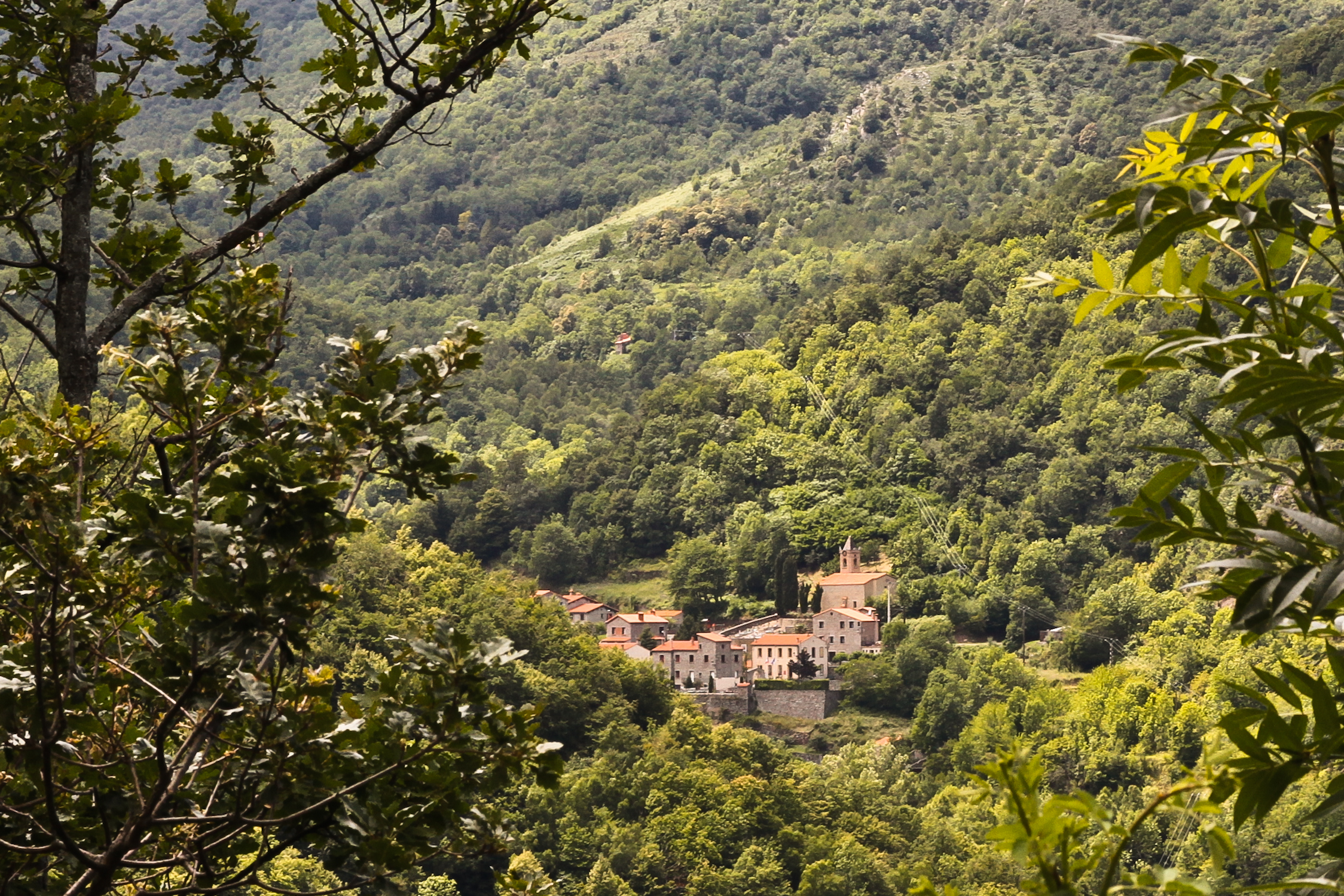
- A general view of Valmanya

- Coat of arms
- Location of Valmanya
- Location within France Location within Occitanie
- Coordinates: 42°32′21″N 2°32′06″E
- Country: France
- Region: Occitania
- Department: Pyrénées-Orientales
- Arrondissement: Prades
- Canton: Le Canigou
- Intercommunality: Conflent-Canigó

Government
  - Mayor (2022–2026): Serge Boyer
- Area^{1}: 27.63 km^{2} (10.67 sq mi)
- Elevation: 901 m (2,956 ft)
- Highest elevation: 2,720 m (8,920 ft)
- Lowest elevation: 692 m (2,270 ft)
- Population (2023): 34
  - Density: 1.2/km^{2} (3.2/sq mi)
- Time zone: UTC+01:00 (CET)
  - Summer (DST): UTC+02:00 (CEST)
- INSEE/Postal code: 66221 /66320
- ^{1} French Land Register data, which excludes lakes, ponds, glaciers > 1 km^{2} (0.386 sq mi or 247 acres) and river estuaries.

Valmanya (French pronunciation: [valmaɲa]; Catalan: Vallmanya) is a commune in the Pyrénées-Orientales department in southern France.

== Geography ==
Valmanya is located in the canton of Le Canigou and in the arrondissement of Prades.

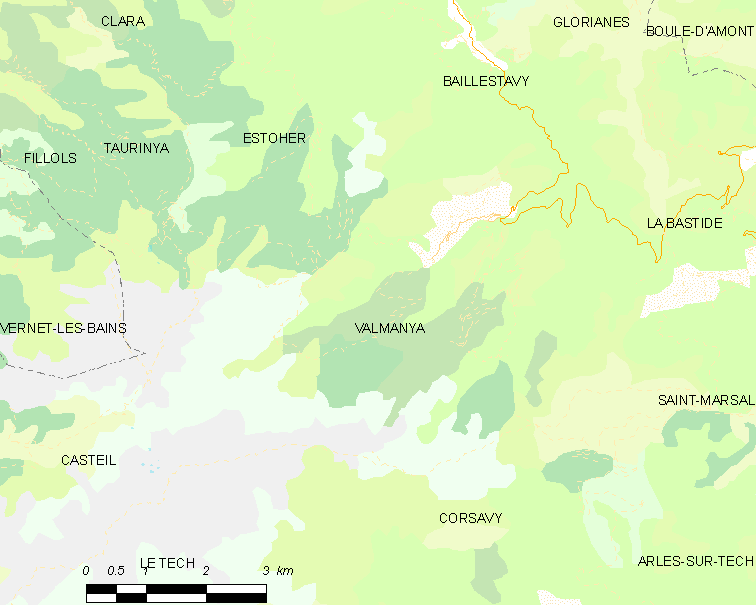
Map of Valmanya and its surrounding communes

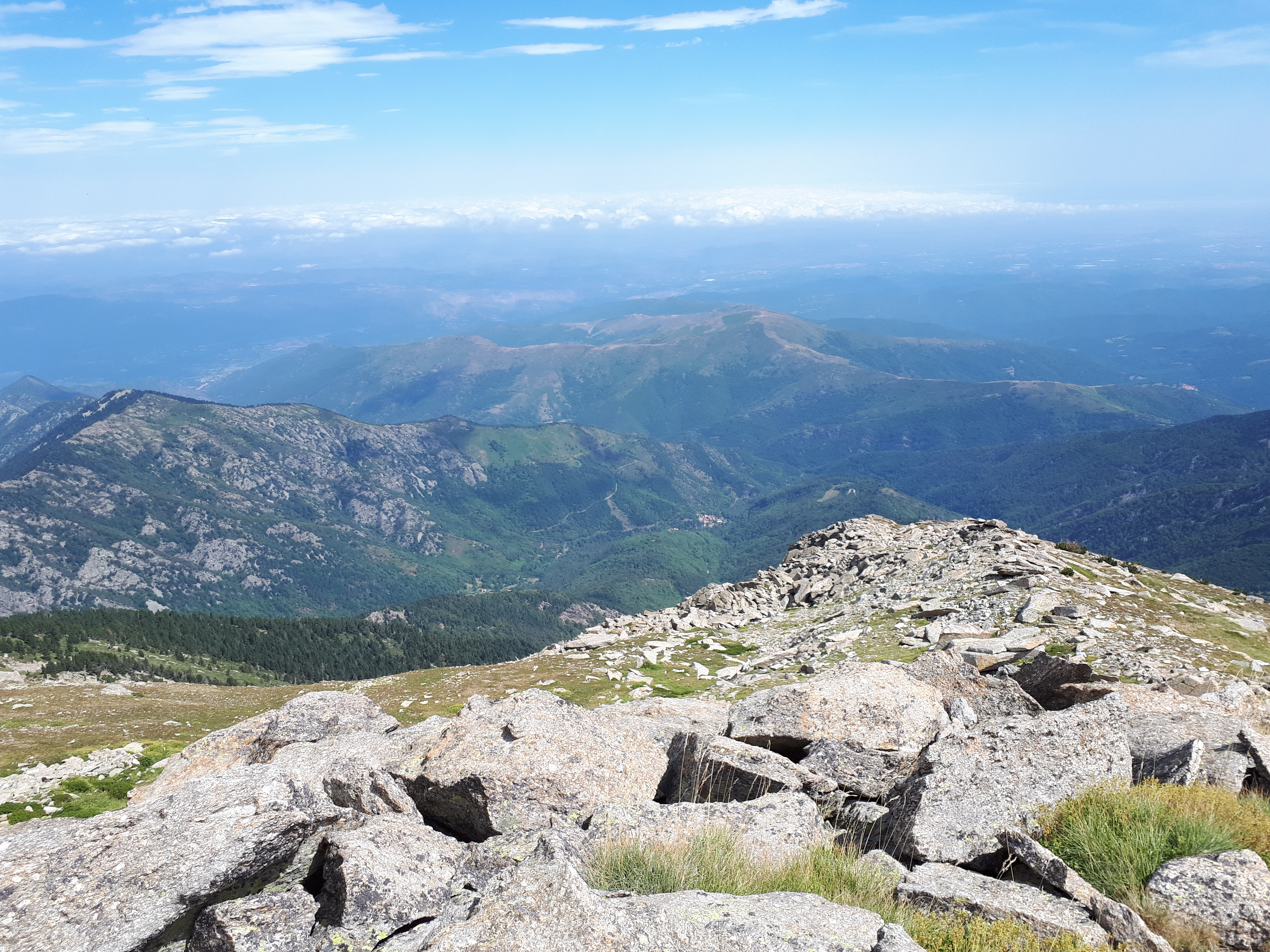
The village of Valmanya, seen from Pic Gallinasse, which lies on the southern boundary of the commune.

== Population ==
Historical population
Year	Pop.	±% p.a.
1968	63	—
1975	29	−10.49%
1982	32	+1.42%
1990	30	−0.80%
1999	18	−5.52%
2007	27	+5.20%
2012	44	+10.26%
2017	34	−5.03%
2023	34	+0.00%
Source: INSEE

== See also ==
- Communes of the Pyrénées-Orientales department
