= Lamanère =

Lamanère La Menera
- Commune
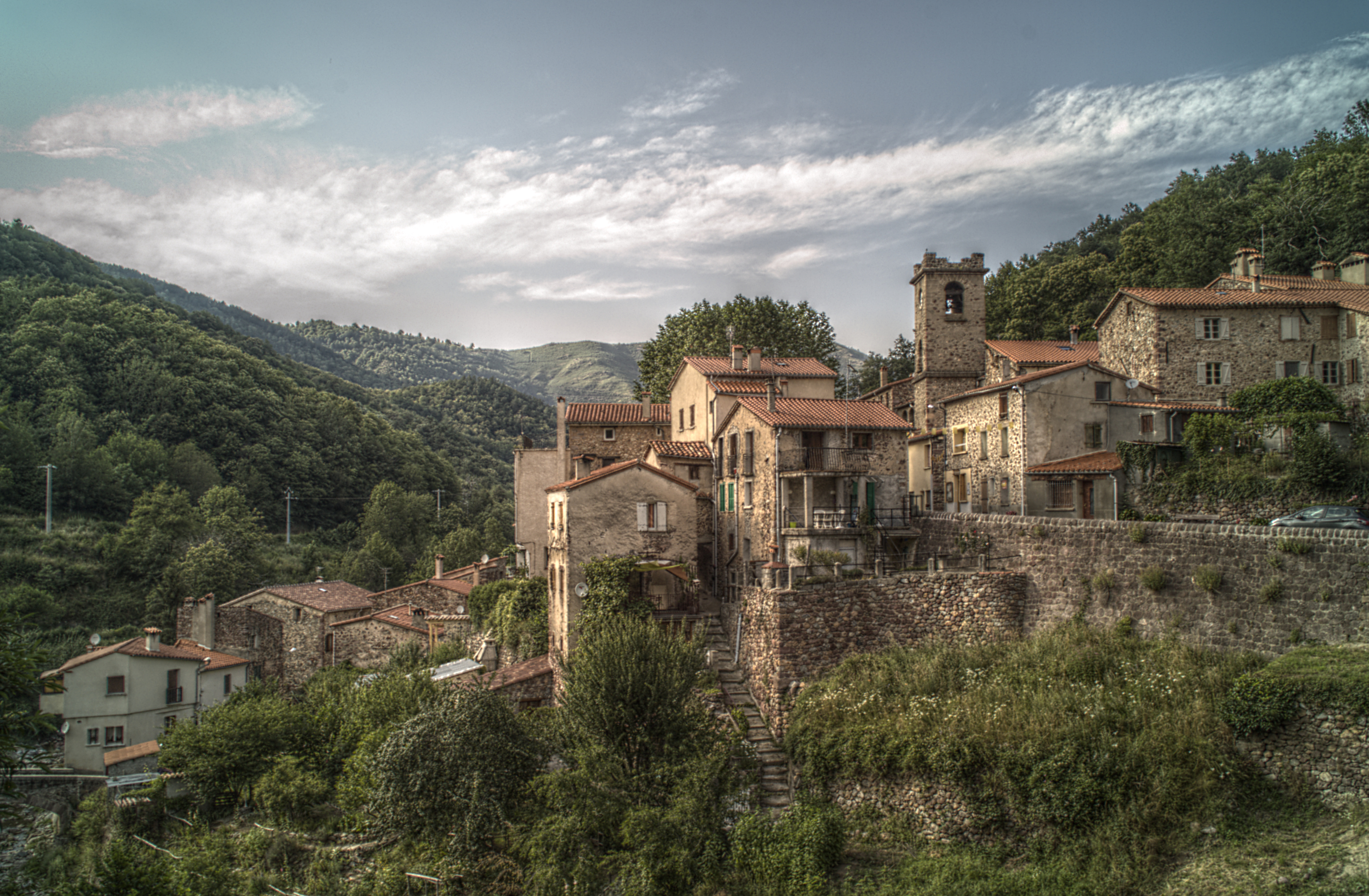
- A general view of Lamanère

- Coat of arms
- Location of Lamanère
- Location within France Location within Occitanie
- Coordinates: 42°21′40″N 2°31′16″E
- Country: France
- Region: Occitania
- Department: Pyrénées-Orientales
- Arrondissement: Céret
- Canton: Le Canigou
- Intercommunality: Haut Vallespir

Government
  - Mayor (2020–2026): Gisèle Juanole
- Area^{1}: 23.83 km^{2} (9.20 sq mi)
- Elevation: 780 m (2,560 ft)
- Highest elevation: 1,554 m (5,098 ft)
- Lowest elevation: 667 m (2,188 ft)
- Population (2023): 62
  - Density: 2.6/km^{2} (6.7/sq mi)
- Time zone: UTC+01:00 (CET)
  - Summer (DST): UTC+02:00 (CEST)
- INSEE/Postal code: 66091 /66230
- ^{1} French Land Register data, which excludes lakes, ponds, glaciers > 1 km^{2} (0.386 sq mi or 247 acres) and river estuaries.

Lamanère (French pronunciation: [lamanɛʁ]; Catalan: La Menera) is a commune in the Pyrénées-Orientales department in southern France.

It is the southernmost village of Continental France.

== Geography ==
Lamanère is located in the canton of Le Canigou and in the arrondissement of Céret.

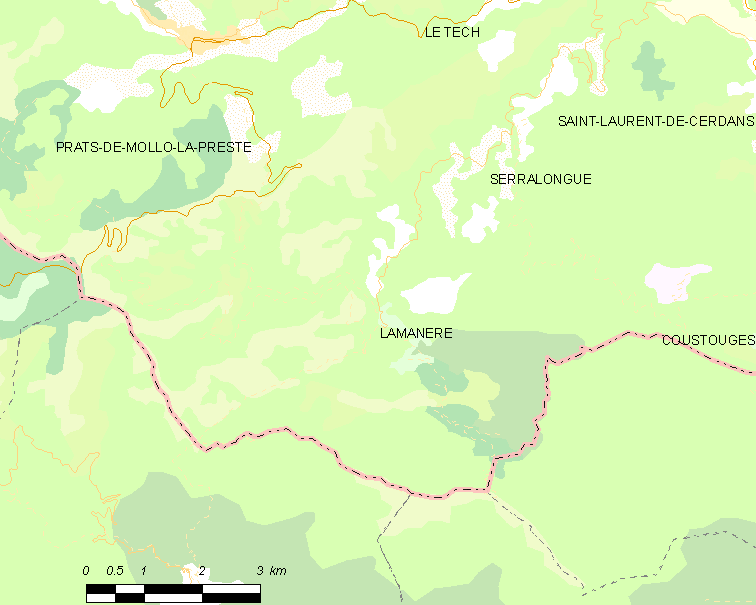
Map of Lamanère and its surrounding communes

== Population ==
Historical population
Year	Pop.	±% p.a.
1968	113	—
1975	74	−5.87%
1982	60	−2.95%
1990	37	−5.86%
1999	44	+1.94%
2007	59	+3.73%
2012	51	−2.87%
2017	46	−2.04%
2023	62	+5.10%
Source: INSEE

== See also ==
- Communes of the Pyrénées-Orientales department
- Bray-Dunes, the northernmost commune of Continental France
