= Joch, Pyrénées-Orientales =

Joch Jóc
- Commune
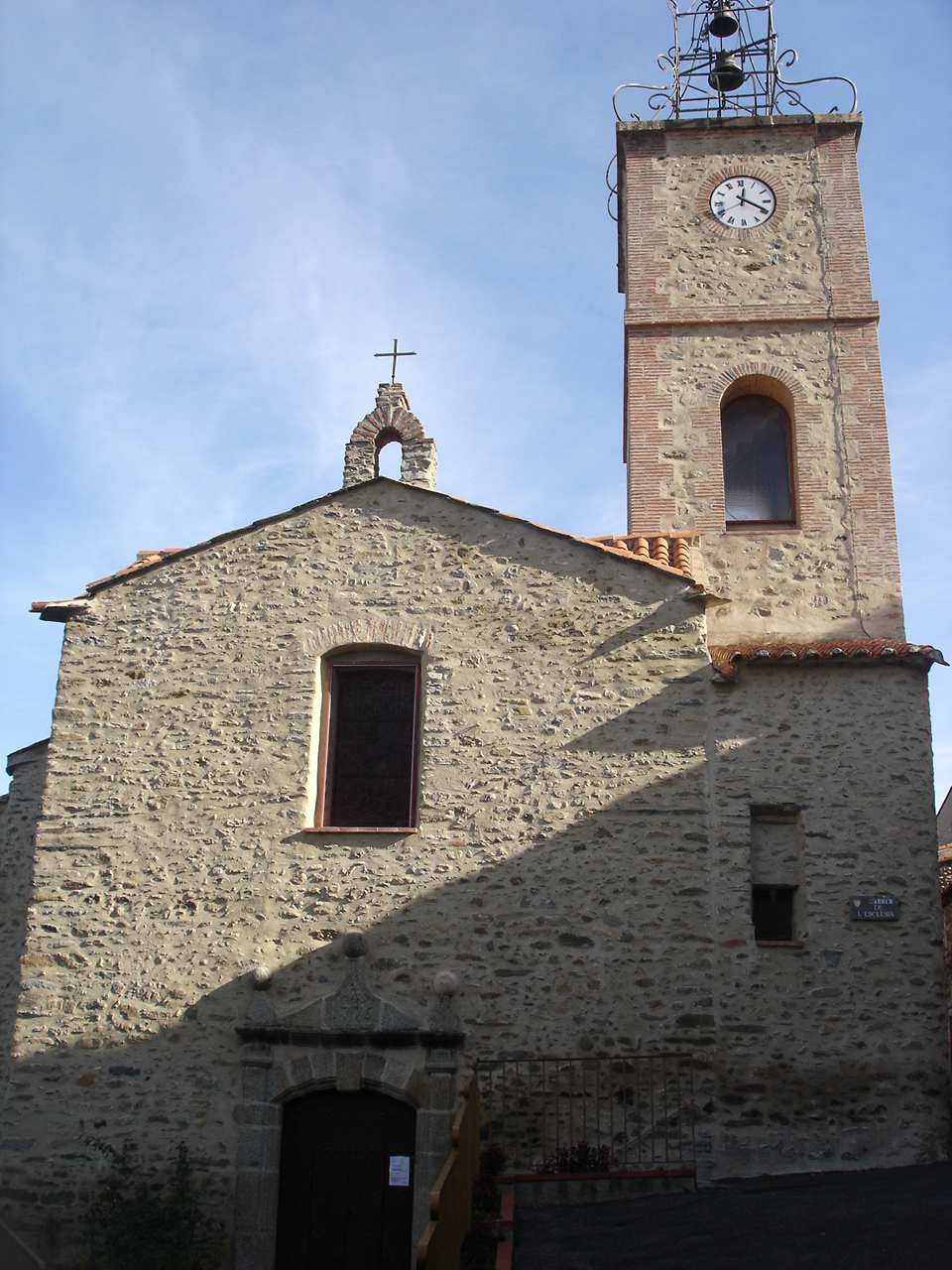
- The church in Joch

- Coat of arms
- Location of Joch
- Location within France Location within Occitanie
- Coordinates: 42°37′06″N 2°31′34″E
- Country: France
- Region: Occitania
- Department: Pyrénées-Orientales
- Arrondissement: Prades
- Canton: Le Canigou

Government
  - Mayor (2020–2026): Jean-Pierre Villelongue
- Area^{1}: 3.38 km^{2} (1.31 sq mi)
- Elevation: 329 m (1,079 ft)
- Highest elevation: 920 m (3,020 ft)
- Lowest elevation: 292 m (958 ft)
- Population (2023): 416
  - Density: 123/km^{2} (319/sq mi)
- Time zone: UTC+01:00 (CET)
  - Summer (DST): UTC+02:00 (CEST)
- INSEE/Postal code: 66089 /66320
- ^{1} French Land Register data, which excludes lakes, ponds, glaciers > 1 km^{2} (0.386 sq mi or 247 acres) and river estuaries.

Joch (French pronunciation: [ʒɔk]; Occitan: Jòc; Catalan: Jóc) is a commune in the Pyrénées-Orientales department in southern France.

== Geography ==
Joch is located in the canton of Le Canigou and in the arrondissement of Prades.

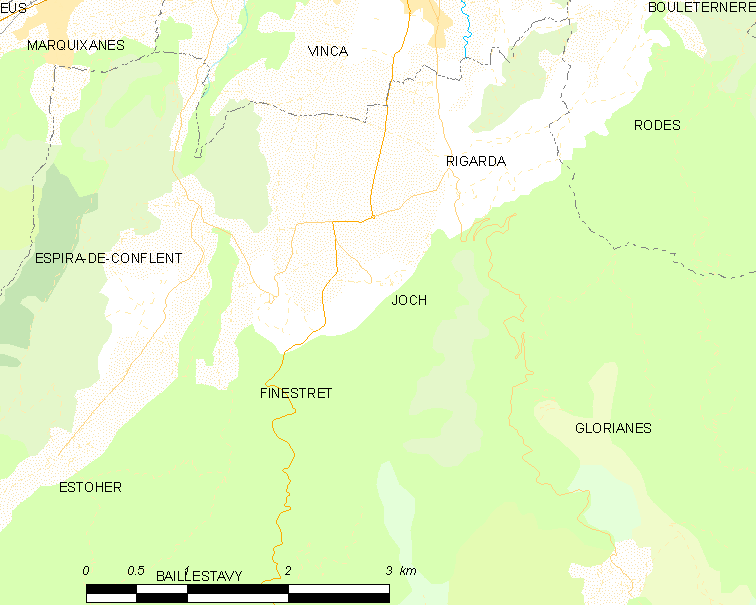
Map of Joch and its surrounding communes

== Population ==
Historical population
Year	Pop.	±% p.a.
1968	160	—
1975	122	−3.80%
1982	124	+0.23%
1990	135	+1.07%
1999	146	+0.87%
2007	222	+5.38%
2012	246	+2.07%
2017	265	+1.50%
2023	416	+7.81%
Source: INSEE

== See also ==
- Communes of the Pyrénées-Orientales department
