= Corsavy =

Corsavy Cortsaví
- Commune
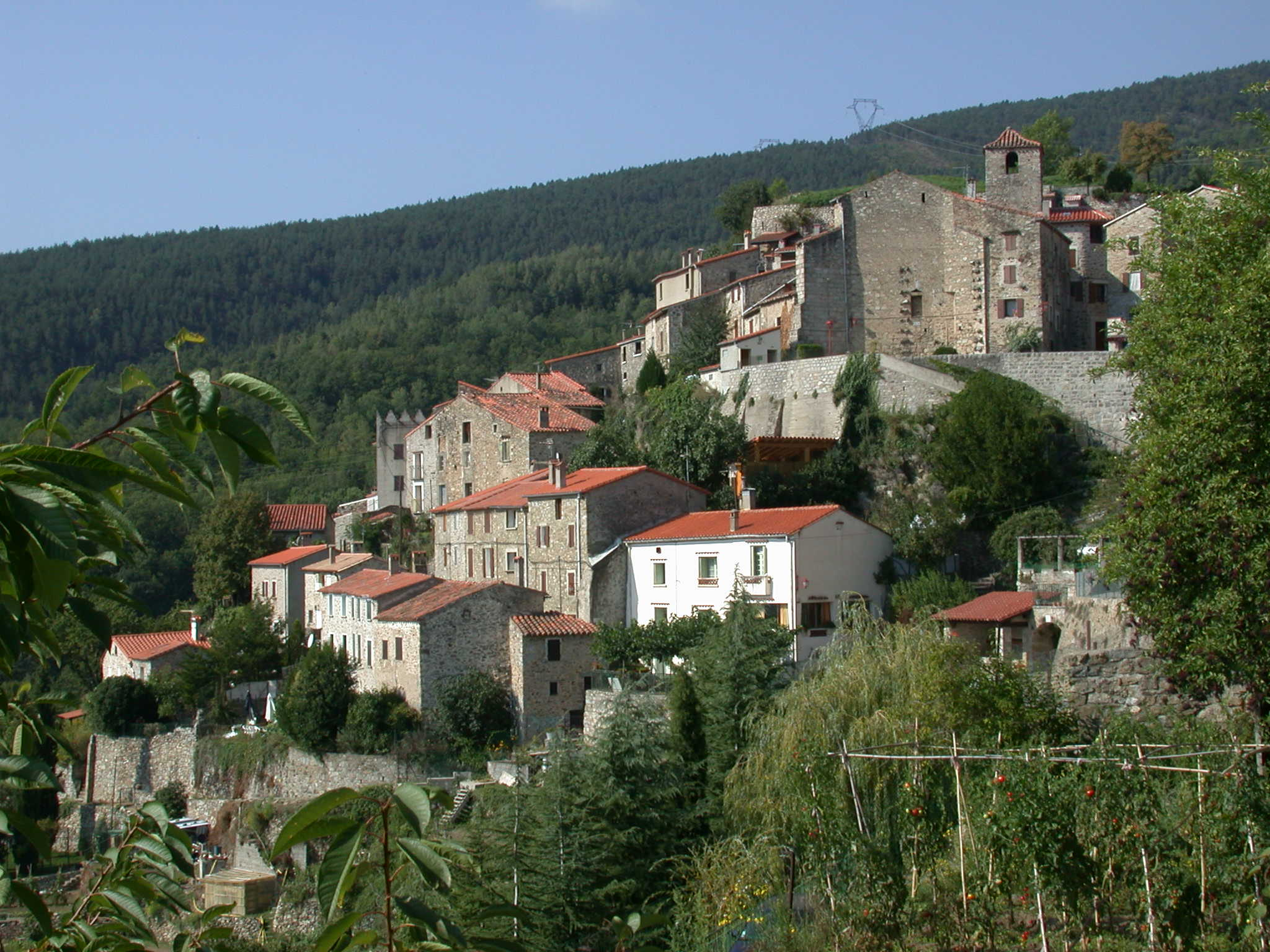
- A general view of the village of Corsavy
- Location of Corsavy
- Location within France Location within Occitanie
- Coordinates: 42°28′04″N 2°34′47″E
- Country: France
- Region: Occitania
- Department: Pyrénées-Orientales
- Arrondissement: Céret
- Canton: Le Canigou
- Intercommunality: Haut Vallespir

Government
  - Mayor (2020–2026): Antoine Chrysostome
- Area^{1}: 47.02 km^{2} (18.15 sq mi)
- Elevation: 800 m (2,600 ft)
- Highest elevation: 2,721 m (8,927 ft)
- Lowest elevation: 345 m (1,132 ft)
- Population (2023): 246
  - Density: 5.23/km^{2} (13.6/sq mi)
- Time zone: UTC+01:00 (CET)
  - Summer (DST): UTC+02:00 (CEST)
- INSEE/Postal code: 66060 /66150
- ^{1} French Land Register data, which excludes lakes, ponds, glaciers > 1 km^{2} (0.386 sq mi or 247 acres) and river estuaries.

Corsavy (French pronunciation: [kɔʁsavi]; Catalan: Cortsaví) is a commune in the Pyrénées-Orientales department in southern France. It is part of the historical Vallespir comarca. It is renowned for its picturesque mountain landscapes and proximity to Mount Canigó. The village lies at an elevation of approximately 800 meters, with the commune’s altitude ranging from 345 to 2,721 meters.

== Geography ==
=== Localisation ===
Corsavy is located in the canton of Le Canigou and in the arrondissement of Céret.

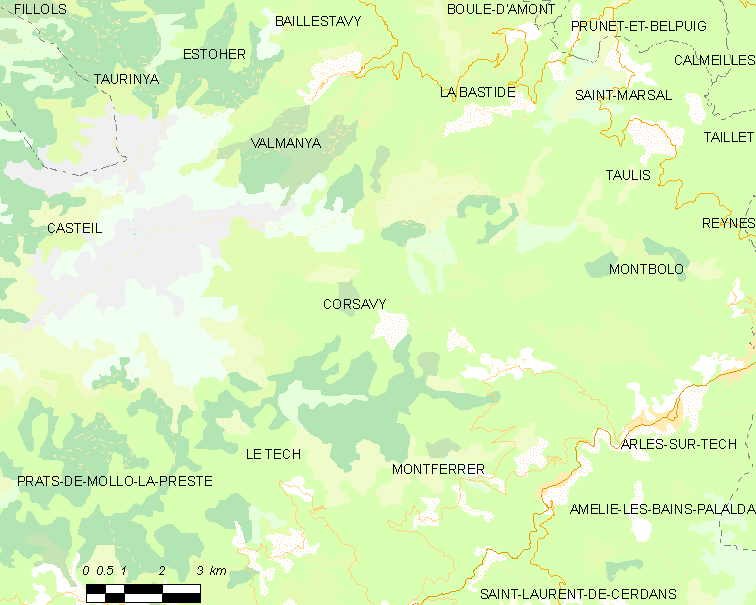
Map of Corsavy and its surrounding communes

== Population ==
Historical population
| Year | Pop. | ±% p.a. |
|---|---|---|
| 1968 | 282 | — |
| 1975 | 263 | −0.99% |
| 1982 | 190 | −4.54% |
| 1990 | 194 | +0.26% |
| 1999 | 204 | +0.56% |
| 2007 | 201 | −0.19% |
| 2012 | 248 | +4.29% |
| 2017 | 218 | −2.55% |
| 2023 | 246 | +2.03% |
Source: INSEE

== See also ==
- Communes of the Pyrénées-Orientales department
