= Canton of Saint-Paul-de-Fenouillet =

Coordinates: 42°28′40″N 2°30′20″E

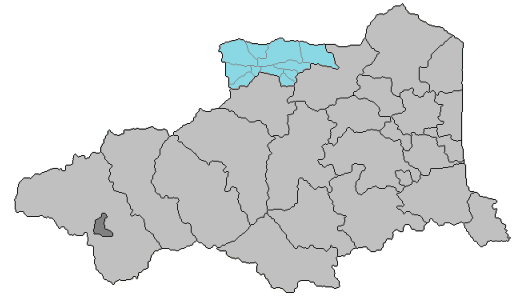
Location of the canton in Pyrénées-Orientales

The Canton of Saint-Paul-de-Fenouillet is a French former canton of Pyrénées-Orientales department, in Languedoc-Roussillon. It had 4,172 inhabitants (2012). It was disbanded following the French canton reorganisation which came into effect in March 2015. It consisted of 11 communes, which joined the new canton of La Vallée de l'Agly in 2015.

The canton comprised the following communes:

- Saint-Paul-de-Fenouillet
- Ansignan
- Caudiès-de-Fenouillèdes
- Fenouillet
- Fosse
- Lesquerde
- Maury
- Prugnanes
- Saint-Arnac
- Saint-Martin-de-Fenouillet
- Vira
