= Canton of Rivesaltes =

Coordinates: 42.7697°N 2.8747°E

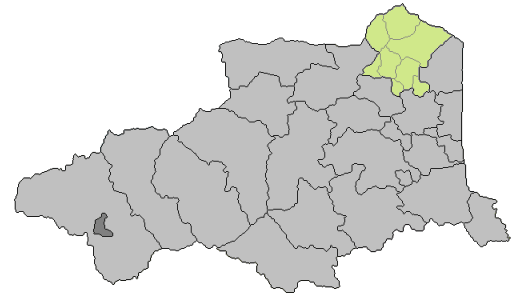
Location of the canton in Pyrénées-Orientales

The Canton of Rivesaltes is a French former canton of the Pyrénées-Orientales department, in the Languedoc-Roussillon region. It had 26,526 inhabitants (2012). It was disbanded following the French canton reorganisation which came into effect in March 2015.

== Composition ==
The canton of Rivesaltes comprised 8 communes:

- Rivesaltes
- Cases-de-Pène
- Espira-de-l'Agly
- Opoul-Périllos
- Peyrestortes
- Pia
- Salses-le-Château
- Vingrau
