= Lansac =

Lansac is the name of several communes in France:

- Lansac, in the Gironde department
- Lansac, in the Hautes-Pyrénées department
- Lansac, in the Pyrénées-Orientales department
- Lansac, a hamlet part of the commune of Tarascon, in the Bouches-du-Rhône department
