= Bélesta =

Bélesta is the name or part of the name of the following communes in France:

- Bélesta, Ariège, in the Ariège department
- Bélesta, Pyrénées-Orientales, in the Pyrénées-Orientales department
- Bélesta-en-Lauragais, in the Haute-Garonne department
