= Planèzes =

Planèzes Planeses (Catalan)
- Commune
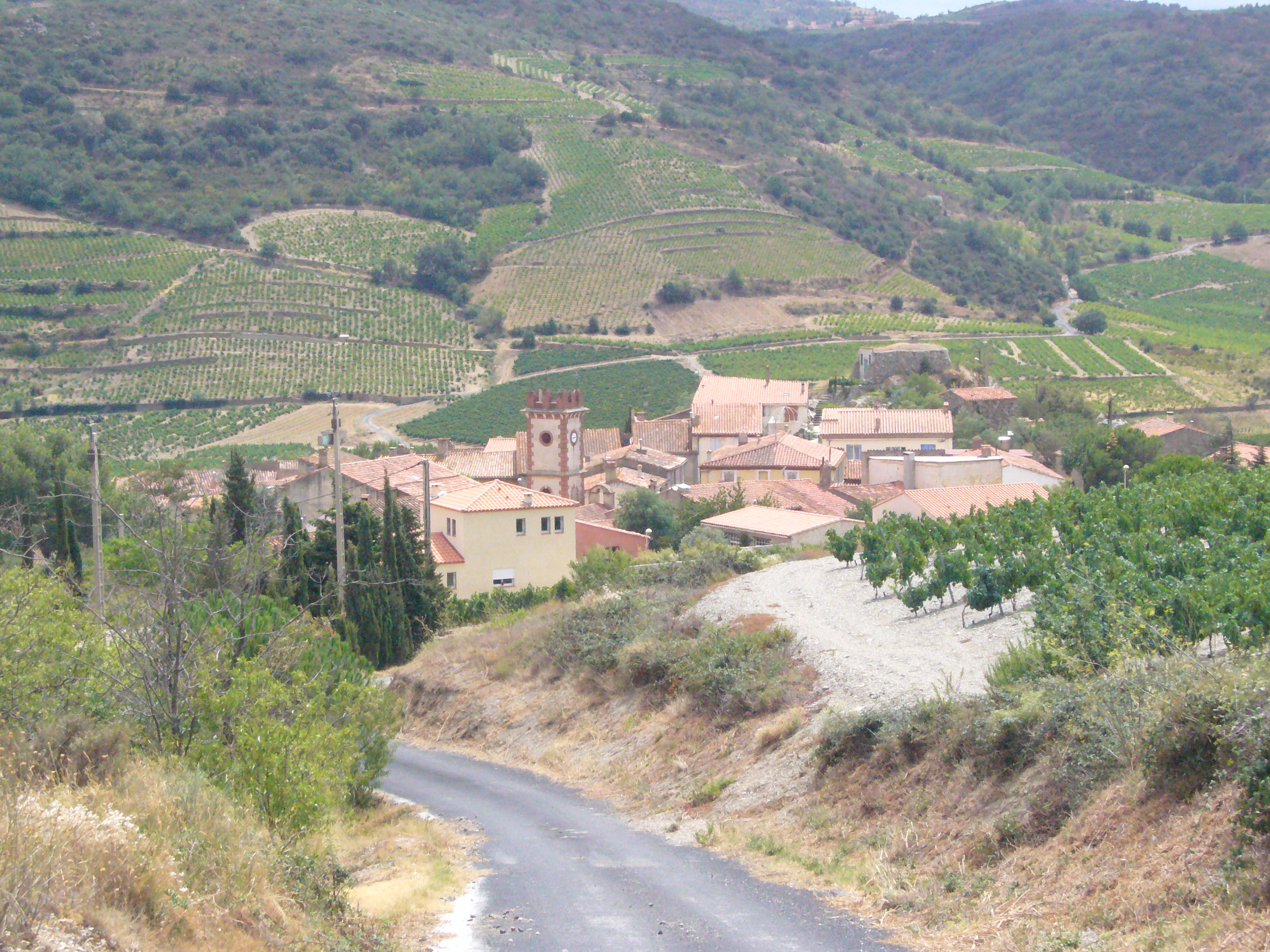
- Looking down the road into Planèzes

- Coat of arms
- Location of Planèzes
- Location within France Location within Occitanie
- Coordinates: 42°46′02″N 2°37′11″E
- Country: France
- Region: Occitania
- Department: Pyrénées-Orientales
- Arrondissement: Prades
- Canton: La Vallée de l'Agly
- Intercommunality: Agly Fenouillèdes

Government
  - Mayor (2020–2026): Sidney Huillet
- Area^{1}: 6.16 km^{2} (2.38 sq mi)
- Elevation: 160 m (520 ft)
- Highest elevation: 423 m (1,388 ft)
- Lowest elevation: 97 m (318 ft)
- Population (2023): 99
  - Density: 16/km^{2} (42/sq mi)
- Time zone: UTC+01:00 (CET)
  - Summer (DST): UTC+02:00 (CEST)
- INSEE/Postal code: 66143 /66720
- ^{1} French Land Register data, which excludes lakes, ponds, glaciers > 1 km^{2} (0.386 sq mi or 247 acres) and river estuaries.

Planèzes (French pronunciation: [planɛz]; Occitan: Planesas; Catalan: Planeses) is a commune in the Pyrénées-Orientales department in southern France.

== Geography ==
Planèzes is located in the canton of La Vallée de l'Agly and in the arrondissement of Perpignan. Planèzes is part of the Fenouillèdes.

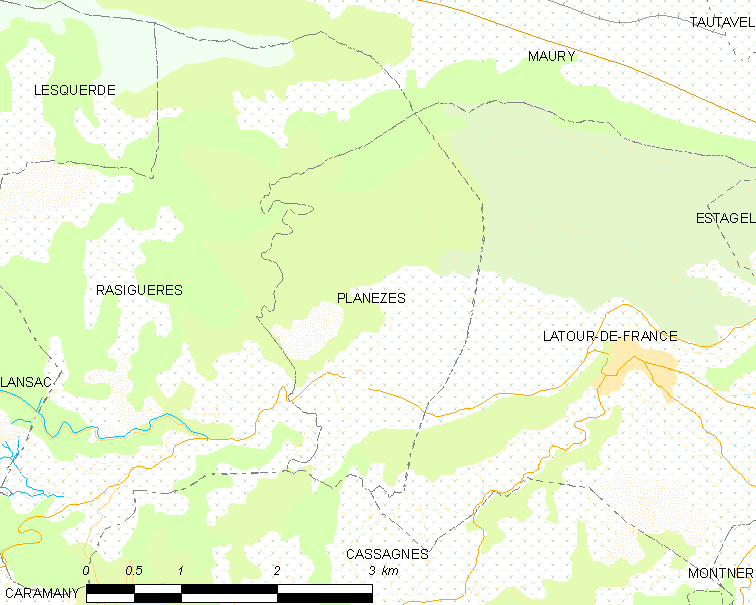
Map of Planèzes and its surrounding communes

== Population ==
Historical population
| Year | Pop. | ±% p.a. |
|---|---|---|
| 1968 | 116 | — |
| 1975 | 82 | −4.83% |
| 1982 | 77 | −0.89% |
| 1990 | 80 | +0.48% |
| 1999 | 99 | +2.40% |
| 2007 | 96 | −0.38% |
| 2012 | 106 | +2.00% |
| 2017 | 99 | −1.36% |
| 2023 | 99 | +0.00% |
Source: INSEE

== See also ==
- Communes of the Pyrénées-Orientales department

=== External links ===
- Planèzes
