= Le Vivier =

Le Vivier Lo Vivièr
- Commune
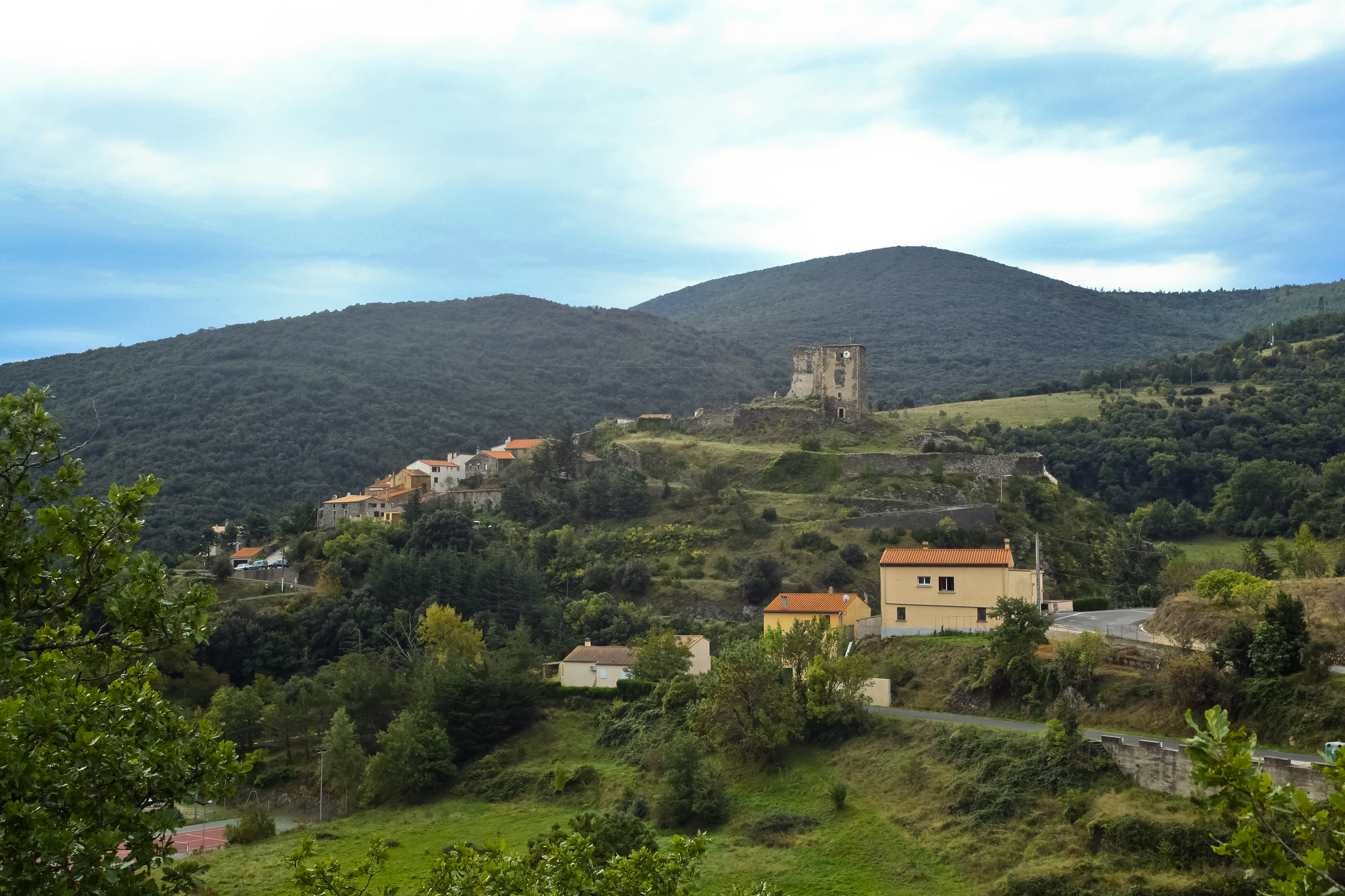
- The chateau and surrounding buildings in Le Vivier

- Coat of arms
- Location of Le Vivier
- Location within France Location within Occitanie
- Coordinates: 42°46′21″N 2°27′15″E
- Country: France
- Region: Occitania
- Department: Pyrénées-Orientales
- Arrondissement: Prades
- Canton: La Vallée de l'Agly

Government
  - Mayor (2020–2026): Eric Bouchadel
- Area^{1}: 12.90 km^{2} (4.98 sq mi)
- Elevation: 426 m (1,398 ft)
- Highest elevation: 1,020 m (3,350 ft)
- Lowest elevation: 340 m (1,120 ft)
- Population (2023): 71
  - Density: 5.5/km^{2} (14/sq mi)
- Time zone: UTC+01:00 (CET)
  - Summer (DST): UTC+02:00 (CEST)
- INSEE/Postal code: 66234 /66730
- ^{1} French Land Register data, which excludes lakes, ponds, glaciers > 1 km^{2} (0.386 sq mi or 247 acres) and river estuaries.

Le Vivier (French pronunciation: [lə vivje]; Occitan: Lo Vivièr; Catalan: El Viver) is a commune in the Pyrénées-Orientales department in southern France.

== Geography ==
Le Vivier is located in the canton of La Vallée de l'Agly and in the arrondissement of Prades.

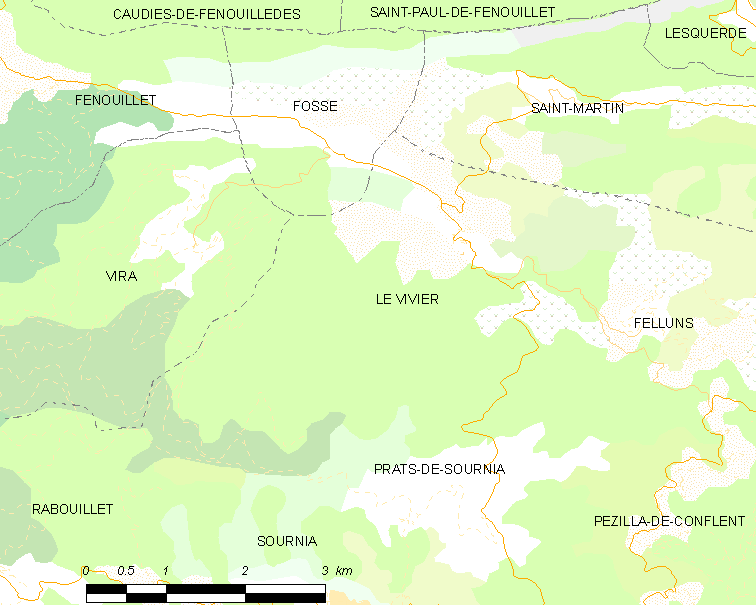
Map of Le Vivier and its surrounding communes

== Population ==
Historical population
Year	Pop.	±% p.a.
1968	159	—
1975	112	−4.88%
1982	112	+0.00%
1990	115	+0.33%
1999	84	−3.43%
2007	84	+0.00%
2012	90	+1.39%
2017	75	−3.58%
2023	71	−0.91%
Source: INSEE

== See also ==
- Communes of the Pyrénées-Orientales department
