= Fosse, Pyrénées-Orientales =

Fosse Fòssa
- Commune
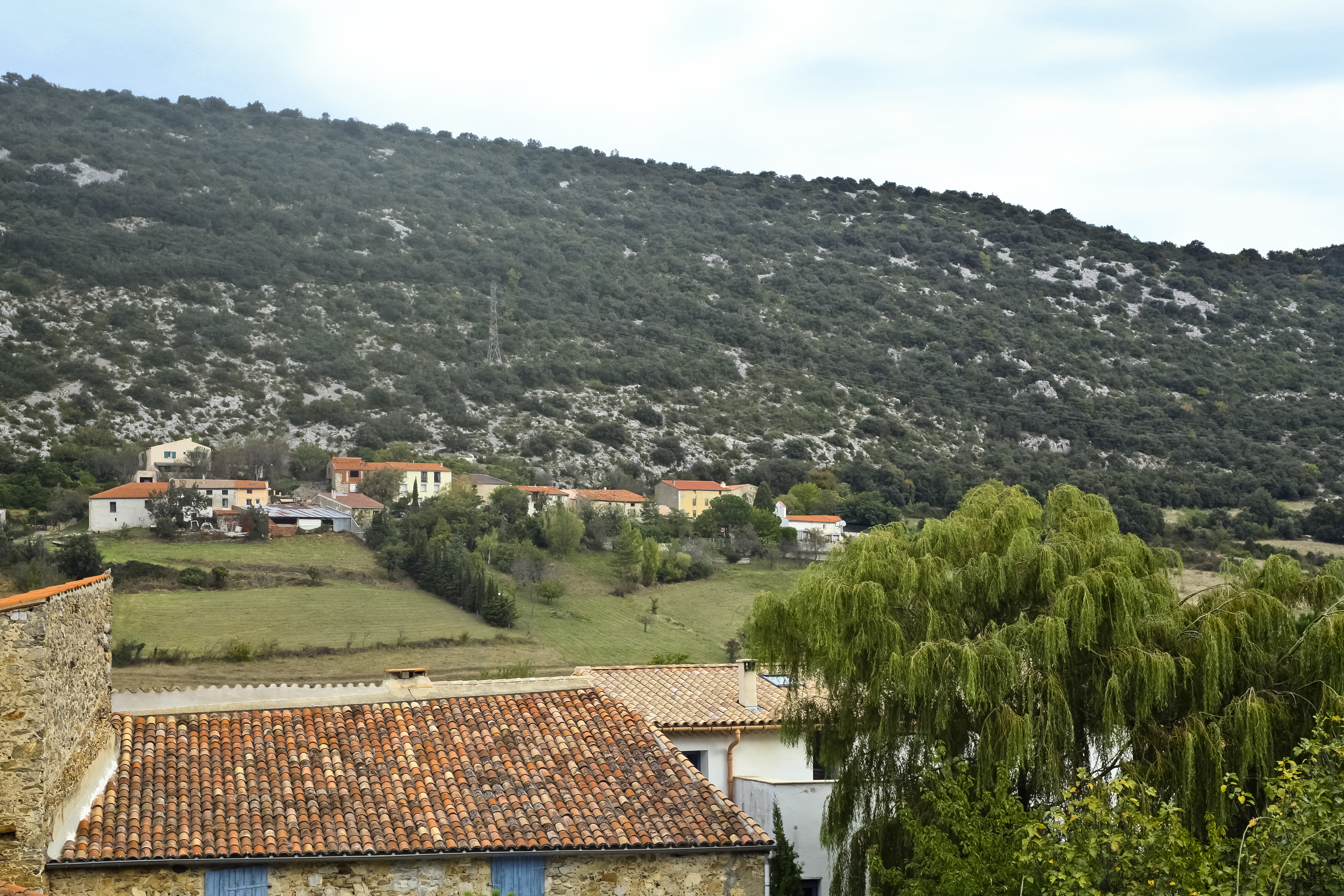
- A general view of Fosse

- Coat of arms
- Location of Fosse
- Location within France Location within Occitanie
- Coordinates: 42°47′21″N 2°25′55″E
- Country: France
- Region: Occitania
- Department: Pyrénées-Orientales
- Arrondissement: Prades
- Canton: La Vallée de l'Agly
- Intercommunality: Agly Fenouillèdes

Government
  - Mayor (2020–2026): Christophe Malaprade
- Area^{1}: 4.43 km^{2} (1.71 sq mi)
- Elevation: 488 m (1,601 ft)
- Highest elevation: 689 m (2,260 ft)
- Lowest elevation: 453 m (1,486 ft)
- Population (2023): 52
  - Density: 12/km^{2} (30/sq mi)
- Time zone: UTC+01:00 (CET)
  - Summer (DST): UTC+02:00 (CEST)
- INSEE/Postal code: 66083 /66220
- ^{1} French Land Register data, which excludes lakes, ponds, glaciers > 1 km^{2} (0.386 sq mi or 247 acres) and river estuaries.

Fosse (French pronunciation: [fos]; Occitan: Fòssa; Catalan: Fossa) is a commune in the Pyrénées-Orientales department in southern France.

== Geography ==
Fosse is located in the canton of La Vallée de l'Agly and in the arrondissement of Perpignan.

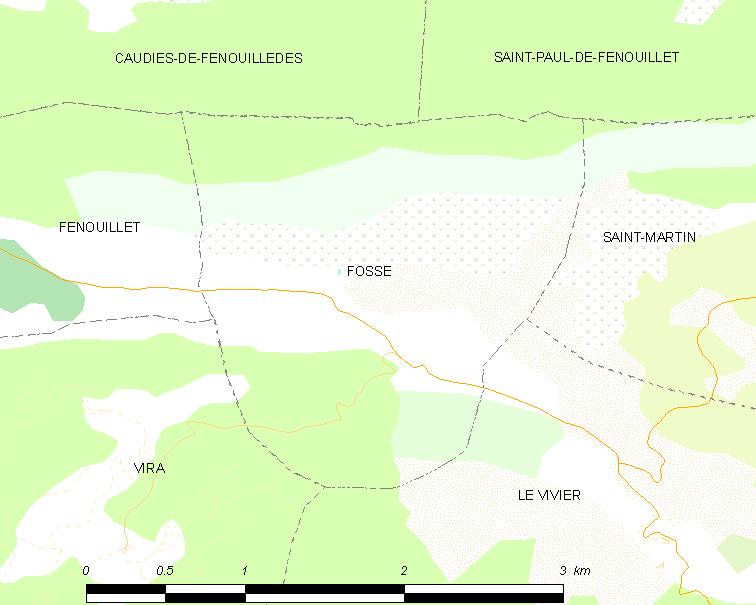
Map of Fosse and its surrounding communes

== Government and politics ==
=== Mayors ===
Mayor	Term start	Term end
Jean-Pierre Pellissier	ca. 1803	?
Germain Pellissier	before 1815	? (reelected in 1815)
A. Pélissier	ca. 1937	?
Hervé Pagane	2001	2008
Michel Garrigue	2008	2020
Christophe Malaprade	2020	incumbent

== Population ==
Historical population
Year	Pop.	±% p.a.
1968	61	—
1975	41	−5.52%
1982	50	+2.88%
1990	34	−4.71%
1999	39	+1.54%
2007	40	+0.32%
2012	39	−0.51%
2017	40	+0.51%
2023	52	+4.47%
Source: INSEE

== See also ==
- Communes of the Pyrénées-Orientales department
