= Saint-Arnac =

Saint-Arnac Sent Arnac
- Commune
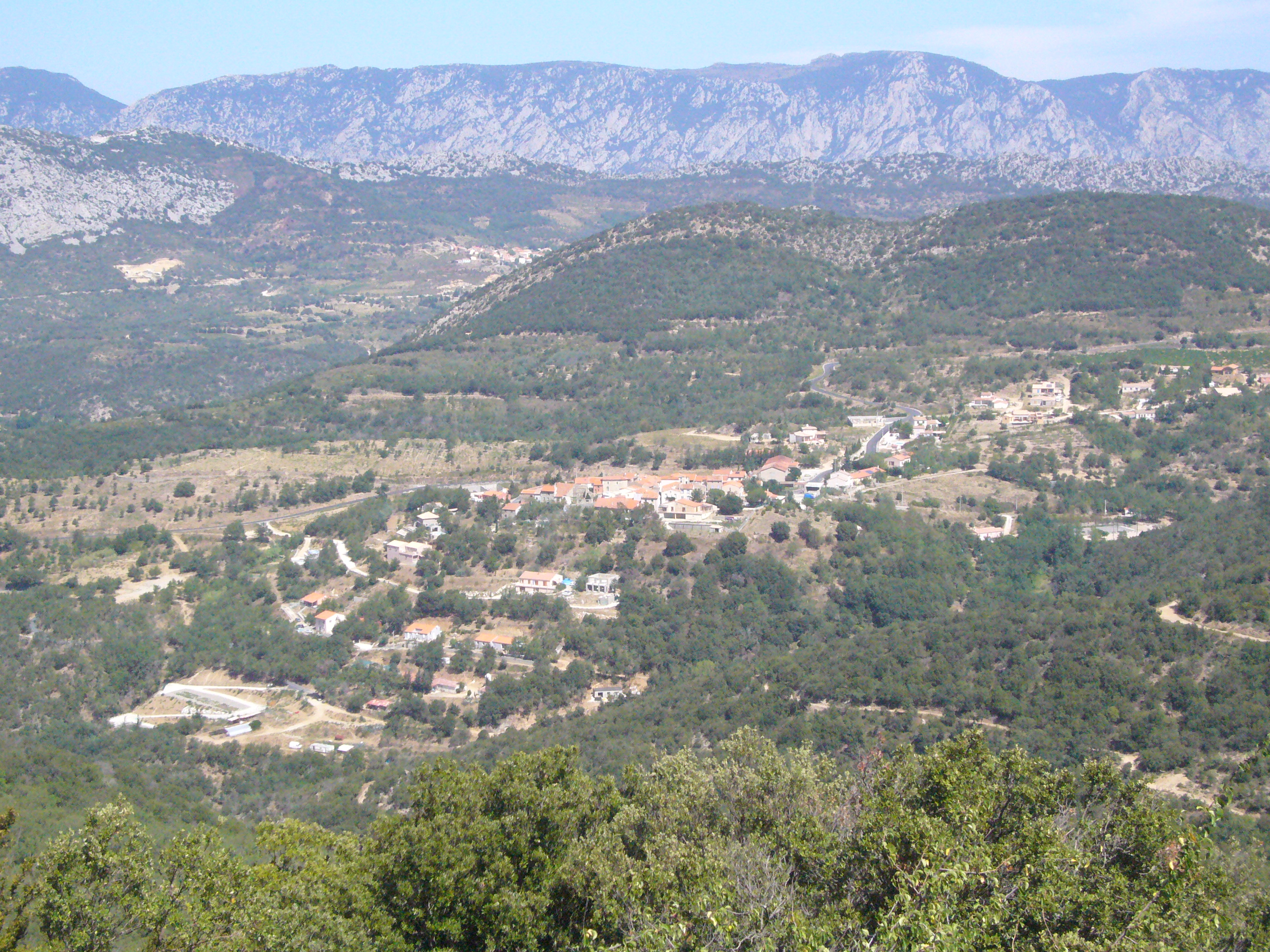
- The village with the Corbières Massif in the background

- Coat of arms
- Location of Saint-Arnac
- Location within France Location within Occitanie
- Coordinates: 42°46′51″N 2°31′48″E
- Country: France
- Region: Occitania
- Department: Pyrénées-Orientales
- Arrondissement: Prades
- Canton: La Vallée de l'Agly
- Intercommunality: Agly Fenouillèdes

Government
  - Mayor (2020–2026): Guy Calvet
- Area^{1}: 6.60 km^{2} (2.55 sq mi)
- Elevation: 306 m (1,004 ft)
- Highest elevation: 583 m (1,913 ft)
- Lowest elevation: 212 m (696 ft)
- Population (2023): 99
  - Density: 15/km^{2} (39/sq mi)
- Time zone: UTC+01:00 (CET)
  - Summer (DST): UTC+02:00 (CEST)
- INSEE/Postal code: 66169 /66220
- ^{1} French Land Register data, which excludes lakes, ponds, glaciers > 1 km^{2} (0.386 sq mi or 247 acres) and river estuaries.

Saint-Arnac (French pronunciation: [sɛ̃.t‿aʁnak]; Occitan: Centernac) is a commune in the Pyrénées-Orientales department in southern France.

== Geography ==
Saint-Arnac is in the canton of La Vallée de l'Agly and in the arrondissement of Perpignan.

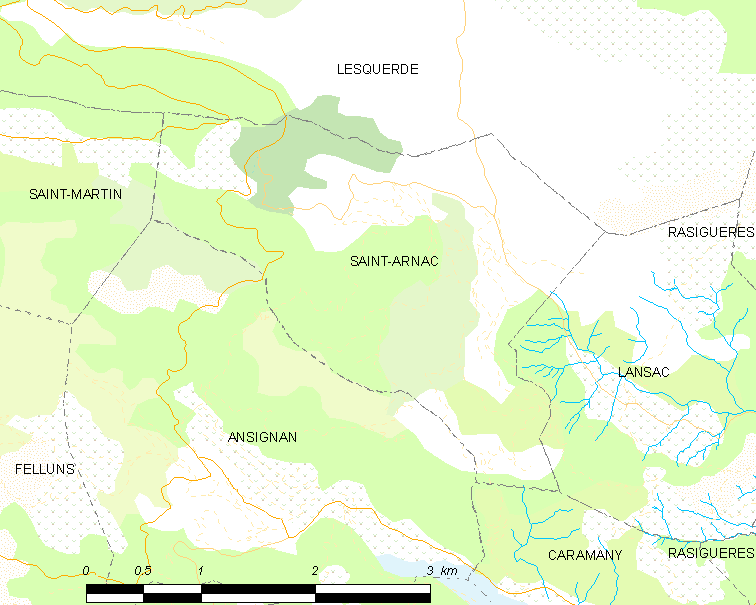
Map of Saint-Arnac and its surrounding communes

== Toponymy ==
Attested forms

The name of Saint-Arnac appears in 899 as villare Centernacho, followed by Centernacum in the 12th century. But already in 1137, Ermengaud de So gives the name Sent Ernach, which later becomes Sant Arnach or Sanctum Arnachum, and then Saint-Arnac or Saint-Arnach in French.

Etymology

The original name, Centernach, is probably that of a landowner, followed by the suffix -acum, which may be either :

- Centerinus (from Centenus);
- Cincturinus (from Cinctura);
- Centuriones (from centurion).

The mistake made in the 12th century by homonymy is a reference to a supposed saint Arnach, who never existed, although Arnac used to be a common German name at the time (from arn, eagle, followed by -acum).

== Population ==
Historical population
Year	Pop.	±% p.a.
1968	95	—
1975	67	−4.87%
1982	68	+0.21%
1990	65	−0.56%
1999	82	+2.62%
2007	120	+4.87%
2012	121	+0.17%
2017	115	−1.01%
2023	99	−2.47%
Source: INSEE

== See also ==
- Communes of the Pyrénées-Orientales department
