= Espira-de-l'Agly =

Espira-de-l'Agly Espirà de l'Aglí
- Commune
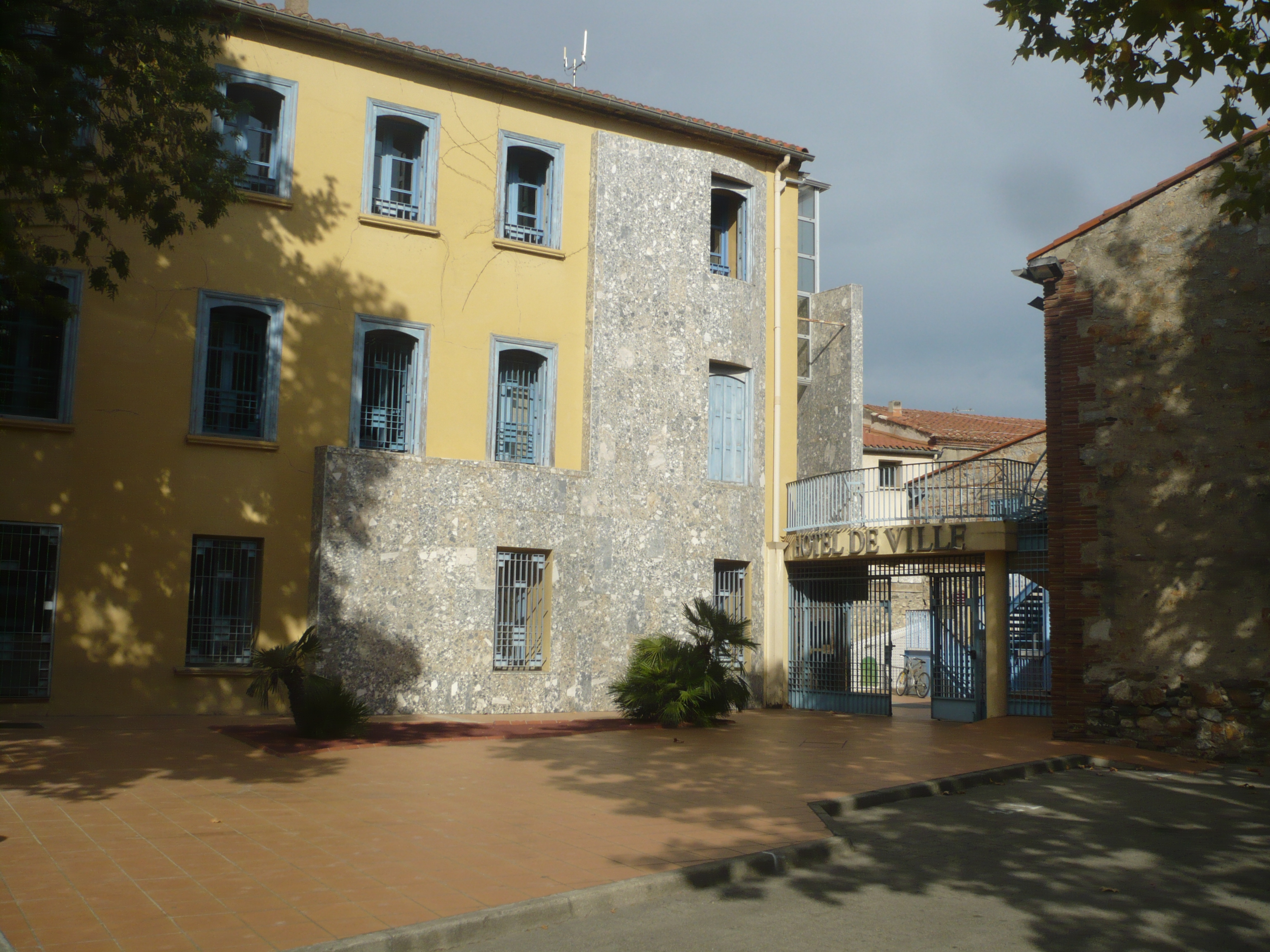
- The town hall in Espira-de-l'Agly

- Coat of arms
- Location of Espira-de-l'Agly
- Location within France Location within Occitanie
- Coordinates: 42°46′41″N 2°50′11″E
- Country: France
- Region: Occitania
- Department: Pyrénées-Orientales
- Arrondissement: Perpignan
- Canton: La Vallée de l'Agly
- Intercommunality: Perpignan Méditerranée Métropole

Government
  - Mayor (2020–2026): Philippe Fourcade
- Area^{1}: 26.77 km^{2} (10.34 sq mi)
- Elevation: 36 m (118 ft)
- Highest elevation: 458 m (1,503 ft)
- Lowest elevation: 26 m (85 ft)
- Population (2023): 3,524
  - Density: 131.6/km^{2} (340.9/sq mi)
- Time zone: UTC+01:00 (CET)
  - Summer (DST): UTC+02:00 (CEST)
- INSEE/Postal code: 66069 /66600
- ^{1} French Land Register data, which excludes lakes, ponds, glaciers > 1 km^{2} (0.386 sq mi or 247 acres) and river estuaries.

Espira-de-l'Agly (French pronunciation: [ɛspiʁa də laɡli], literally Espira of the Agly; Catalan: Espirà de l'Aglí) is a commune in the Pyrénées-Orientales department in southern France.

== Geography ==
=== Localisation ===
Espira-de-l'Agly is located in the canton of La Vallée de l'Agly and in the arrondissement of Perpignan. Espira-de-l'Agly is situated approximately 12 km outside Perpignan.

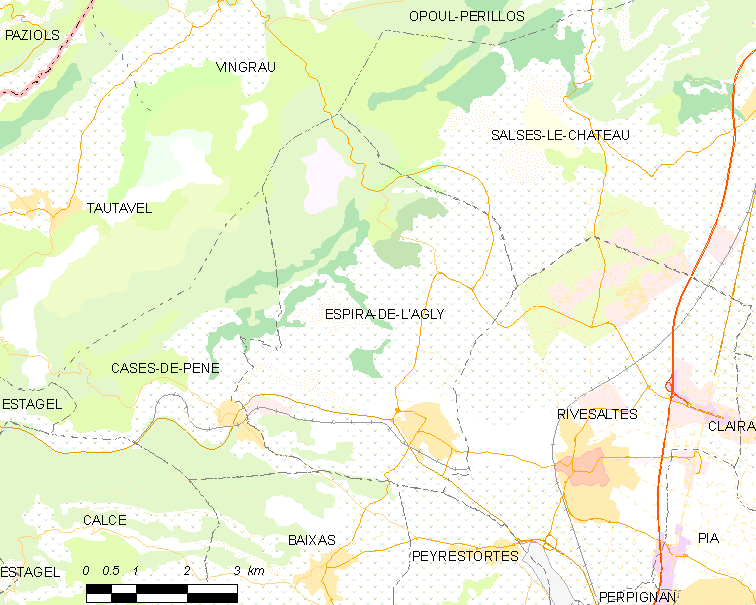
Map of Espira-de-l'Agly and its surrounding communes

== Population ==
Historical population
Year	Pop.	±% p.a.
1968	1,685	—
1975	1,599	−0.75%
1982	1,723	+1.07%
1990	2,196	+3.08%
1999	2,463	+1.28%
2007	2,960	+2.32%
2012	3,304	+2.22%
2017	3,455	+0.90%
2023	3,524	+0.33%
Source: INSEE

== See also ==
- Communes of the Pyrénées-Orientales department
