= Canton of La Vallée de l'Agly =

Coordinates: 42.77°N 2.87°E

The canton of La Vallée de l'Agly is an administrative division of the Pyrénées-Orientales department, in southern France. It was created at the French canton reorganisation which came into effect in March 2015. Its seat is in Rivesaltes.

It consists of the following communes:

1. Ansignan
2. Arboussols
3. Bélesta
4. Campoussy
5. Caramany
6. Camps-sur-l'Agly
7. Cases-de-Pène
8. Cassagnes
9. Caudiès-de-Fenouillèdes
10. Espira-de-l'Agly
11. Estagel
12. Feilluns
13. Fenouillet
14. Fosse
15. Lansac
16. Latour-de-France
17. Lesquerde
18. Maury
19. Montner
20. Opoul-Périllos
21. Pézilla-de-Conflent
22. Planèzes
23. Prats-de-Sournia
24. Prugnanes
25. Rabouillet
26. Rasiguères
27. Rivesaltes
28. Saint-Arnac
29. Saint-Martin-de-Fenouillet
30. Saint-Paul-de-Fenouillet
31. Salses-le-Château
32. Sournia
33. Tarerach
34. Tautavel
35. Trévillach
36. Trilla
37. Vingrau
38. Vira
39. Le Vivier
