= Cases-de-Pène =

- Commune
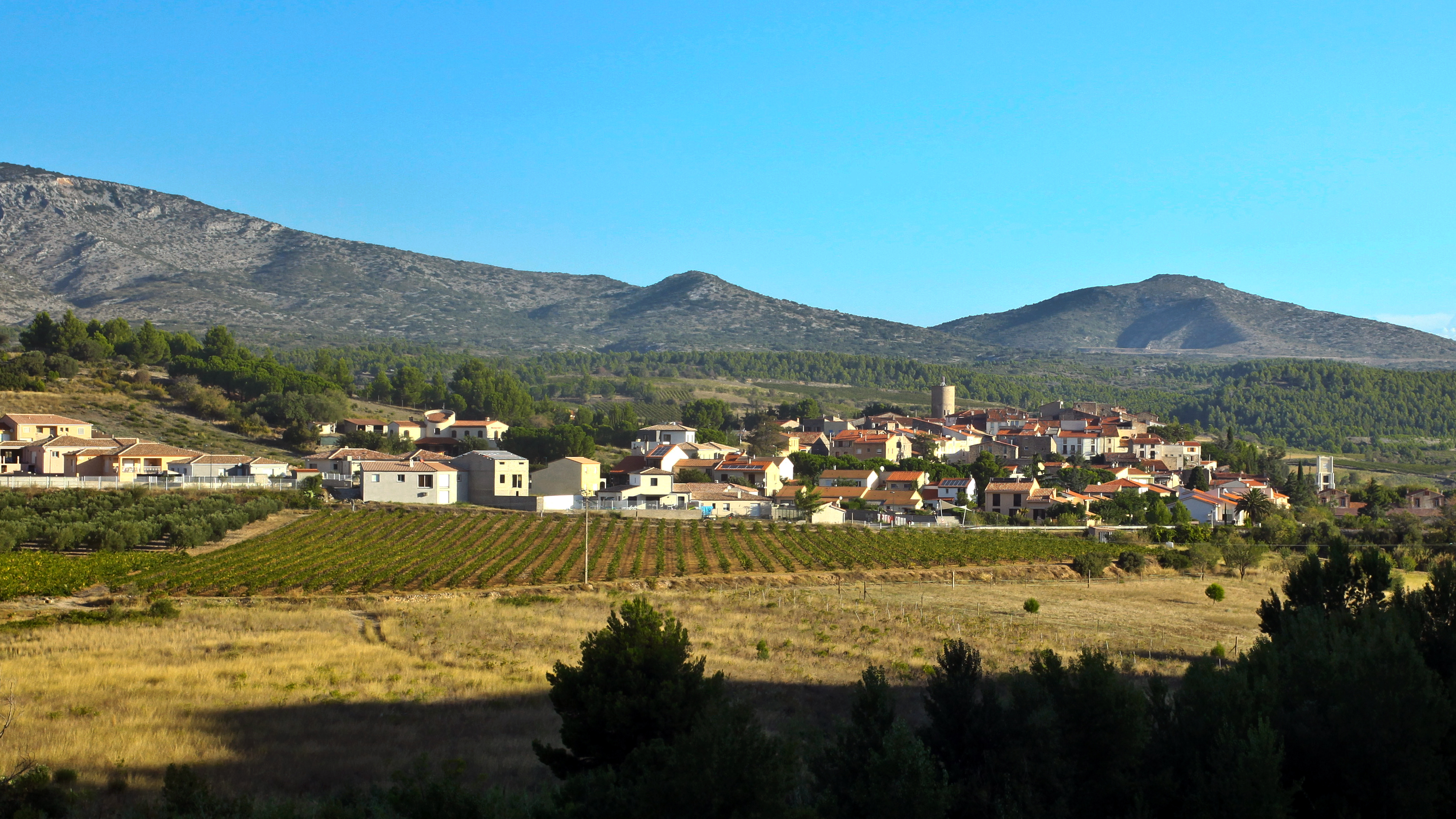
- A general view of Cases-de-Pène

- Coat of arms
- Location of Cases-de-Pène
- Location within France Location within Occitanie
- Coordinates: 42°46′49″N 2°47′16″E
- Country: France
- Region: Occitania
- Department: Pyrénées-Orientales
- Arrondissement: Perpignan
- Canton: La Vallée de l'Agly
- Intercommunality: Perpignan Méditerranée Métropole

Government
  - Mayor (2020–2026): Théophile Martinez
- Area^{1}: 13.38 km^{2} (5.17 sq mi)
- Elevation: 46 m (151 ft)
- Highest elevation: 362 m (1,188 ft)
- Lowest elevation: 36 m (118 ft)
- Population (2023): 973
  - Density: 72.7/km^{2} (188/sq mi)
- Time zone: UTC+01:00 (CET)
  - Summer (DST): UTC+02:00 (CEST)
- INSEE/Postal code: 66041 /66600
- ^{1} French Land Register data, which excludes lakes, ponds, glaciers > 1 km^{2} (0.386 sq mi or 247 acres) and river estuaries.

Cases-de-Pène (French pronunciation: [kaz də pɛn]; Occitan: Caças de Pène; Catalan: Cases de Pena) is a commune in the Pyrénées-Orientales department in southern France.

== Geography ==
=== Localisation ===
Cases-de-Pène is located in the canton of La Vallée de l'Agly and in the arrondissement of Perpignan.

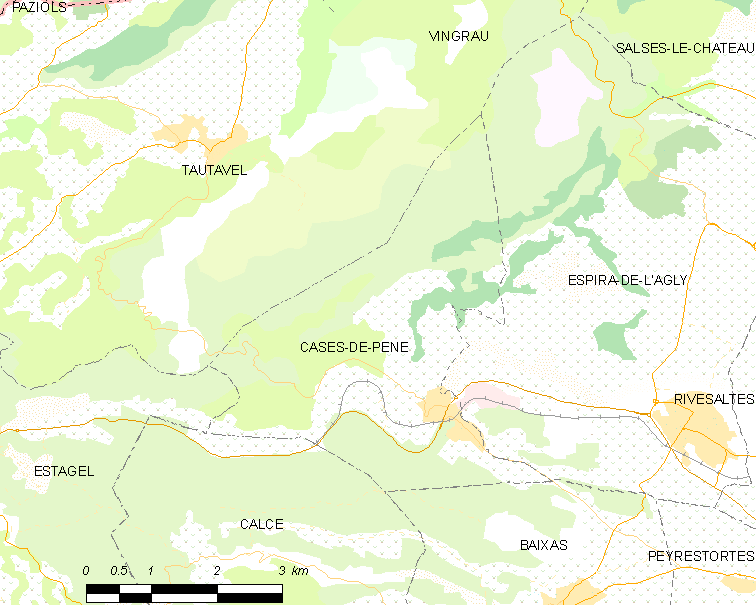
Map of Cases-de-Pène and its surrounding communes

== Politics and administration ==
=== Mayors ===
Mayor	Term start	Term end
Michèle Jodar	?	2001
Jeannine Rolland	2001	2008
Théophile Martinez	2008	

== Population and society ==
=== Demography ===
Historical population
Year	Pop.	±% p.a.
1968	483	—
1975	334	−5.13%
1982	387	+2.13%
1990	406	+0.60%
1999	430	+0.64%
2007	685	+5.99%
2012	834	+4.01%
2017	926	+2.11%
2023	973	+0.83%
Source: INSEE

=== Education ===
The town of Cases-de-Pène has a kindergarten and elementary school, with about 112 children.

Following a conflict between the mayor and the teacher in 1908, as she refused to resign, the mayor had a brickwall built in front of the school's entrance to force her to leave.

== See also ==
- Communes of the Pyrénées-Orientales department
