= Bélesta, Pyrénées-Orientales =

Bélesta Belhestar
- Commune
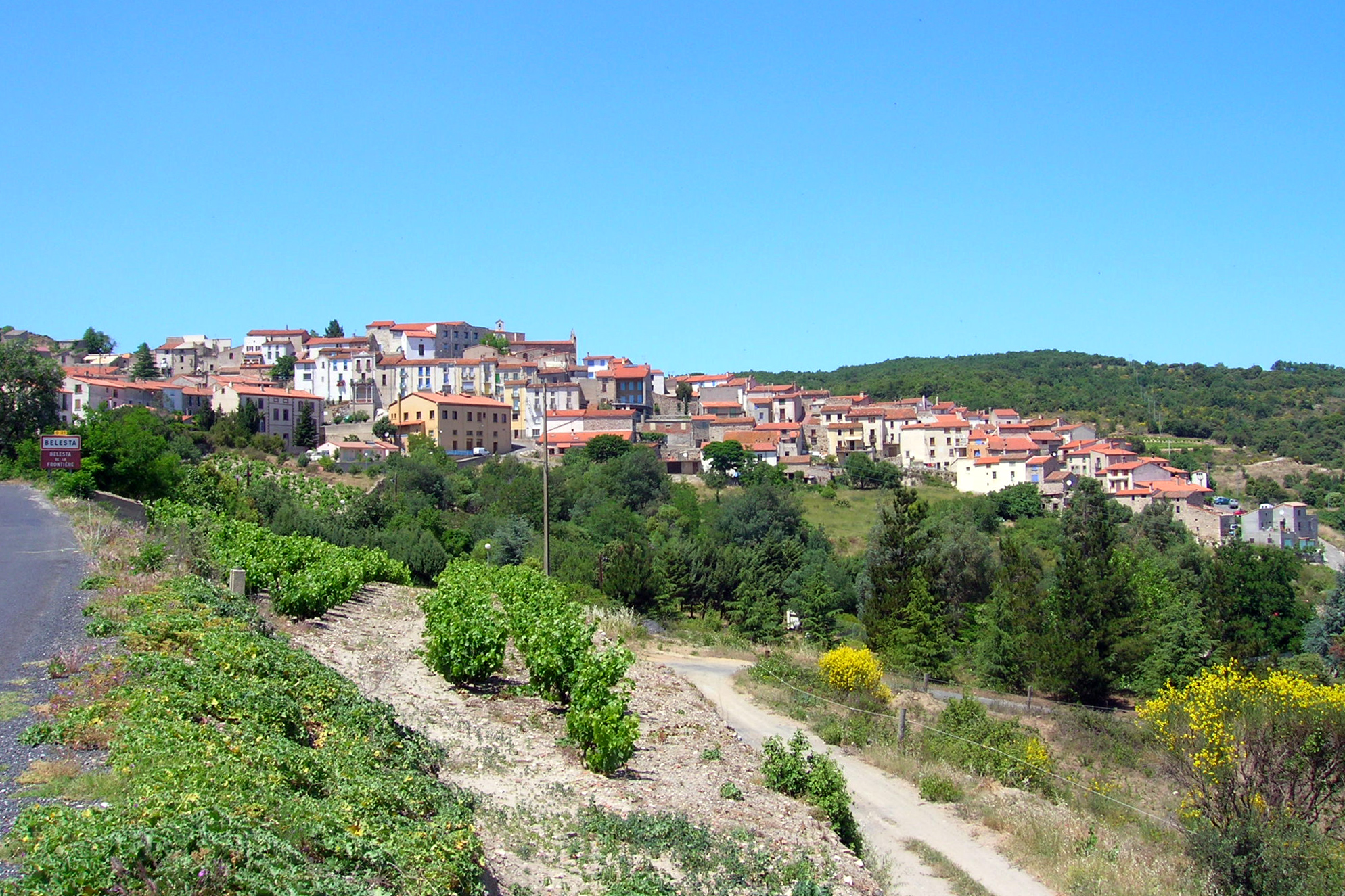
- A general view of Bélesta

- Coat of arms
- Location of Bélesta
- Location within France Location within Occitanie
- Coordinates: 42°43′06″N 2°36′28″E
- Country: France
- Region: Occitania
- Department: Pyrénées-Orientales
- Arrondissement: Prades
- Canton: La Vallée de l'Agly
- Intercommunality: Roussillon-Conflent

Government
  - Mayor (2020–2026): Frédéric Bourniole
- Area^{1}: 20.52 km^{2} (7.92 sq mi)
- Elevation: 380 m (1,250 ft)
- Highest elevation: 561 m (1,841 ft)
- Lowest elevation: 122 m (400 ft)
- Population (2023): 270
  - Density: 13/km^{2} (34/sq mi)
- Time zone: UTC+01:00 (CET)
  - Summer (DST): UTC+02:00 (CEST)
- INSEE/Postal code: 66019 /66720
- ^{1} French Land Register data, which excludes lakes, ponds, glaciers > 1 km^{2} (0.386 sq mi or 247 acres) and river estuaries.

Bélesta (French pronunciation: [belɛsta]; Occitan: Belhestar; Catalan: Bellestar) is a commune in the Pyrénées-Orientales department in southern France.

== Geography ==
=== Localisation ===
Bélesta is located in the canton of La Vallée de l'Agly and in the arrondissement of Perpignan.

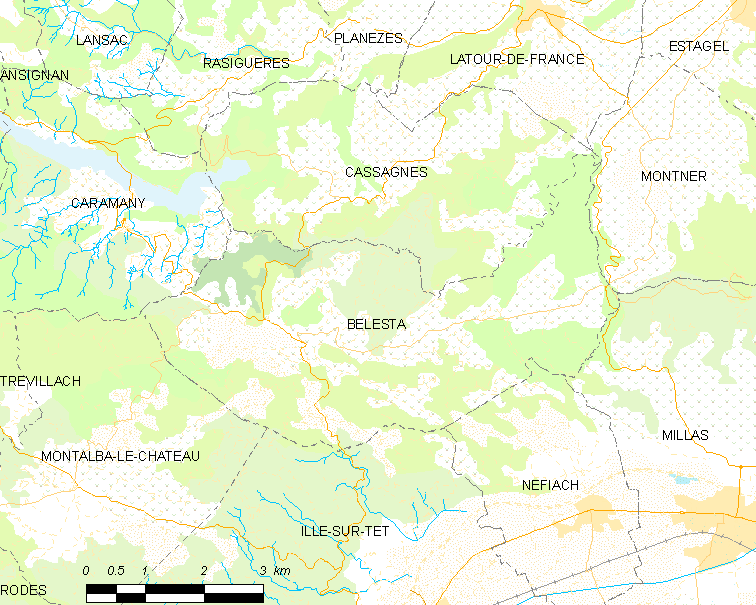
Map of Bélesta and its surrounding communes

== Government and politics ==
Mayors

Mayor	Term start	Term end
Jacques Biles	?	June 1815
Baptiste Pugnaud	June 1815	?
Gilbert Bourniole	2001	2007
Roger Morin	2007	2014
Frédéric Bourniole	2014	

== Population ==
Historical population
Year	Pop.	±% p.a.
1968	312	—
1975	262	−2.46%
1982	247	−0.84%
1990	223	−1.27%
1999	215	−0.41%
2007	214	−0.06%
2012	225	+1.01%
2017	221	−0.36%
2023	270	+3.39%
Source: INSEE

== Sites of interest ==
- Prehistory museum
- Bélesta dolmen
- Bélesta cave
- Church of Saint Barthelemy in Bélesta
- Church of Saint Barthelemy in Jonqueroles
- Llébrès, an abandoned medieval hamlet
- Caladroy, hamlet with Château de Caladroy and an important winery
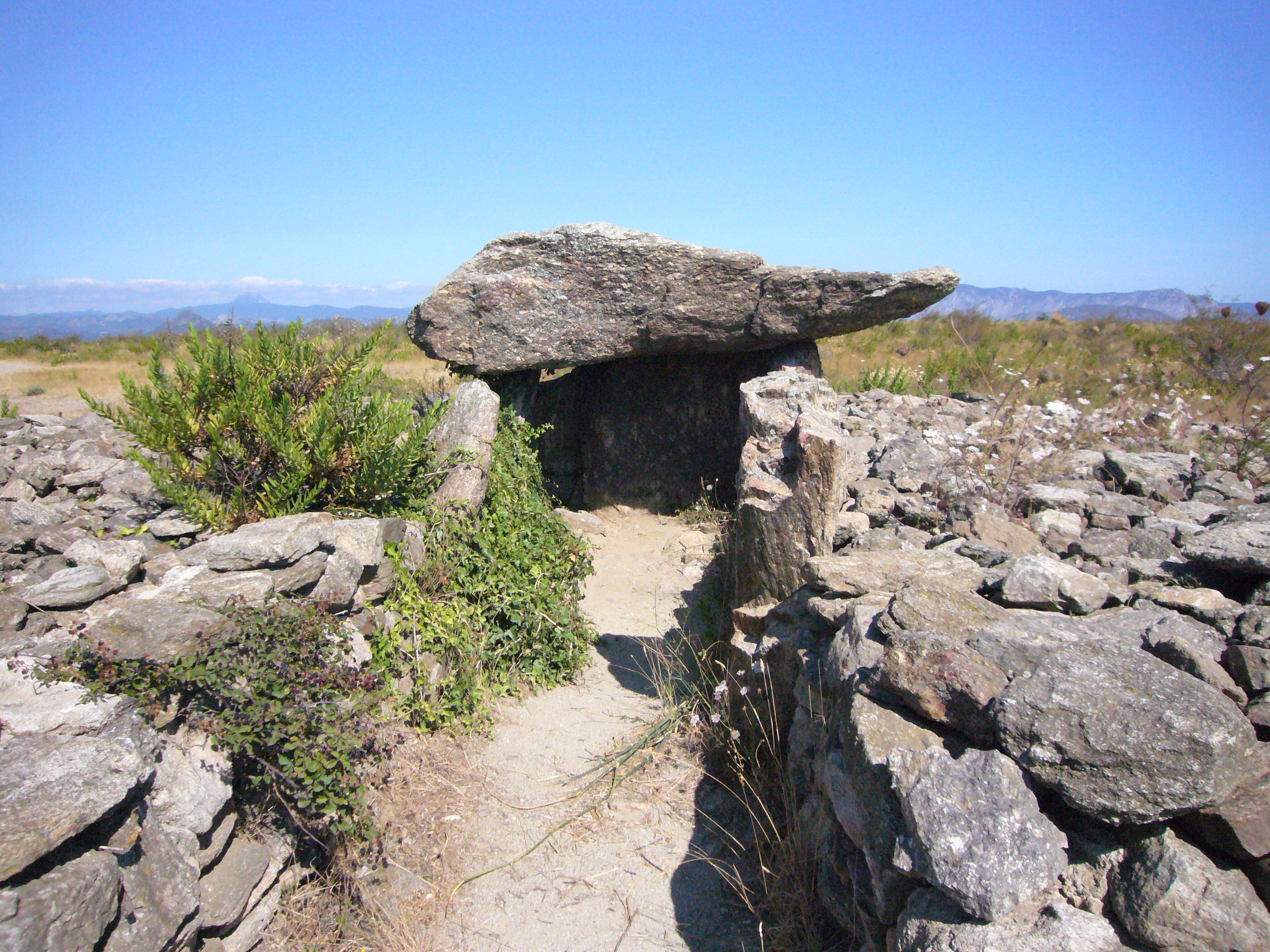
Bélesta dolmen

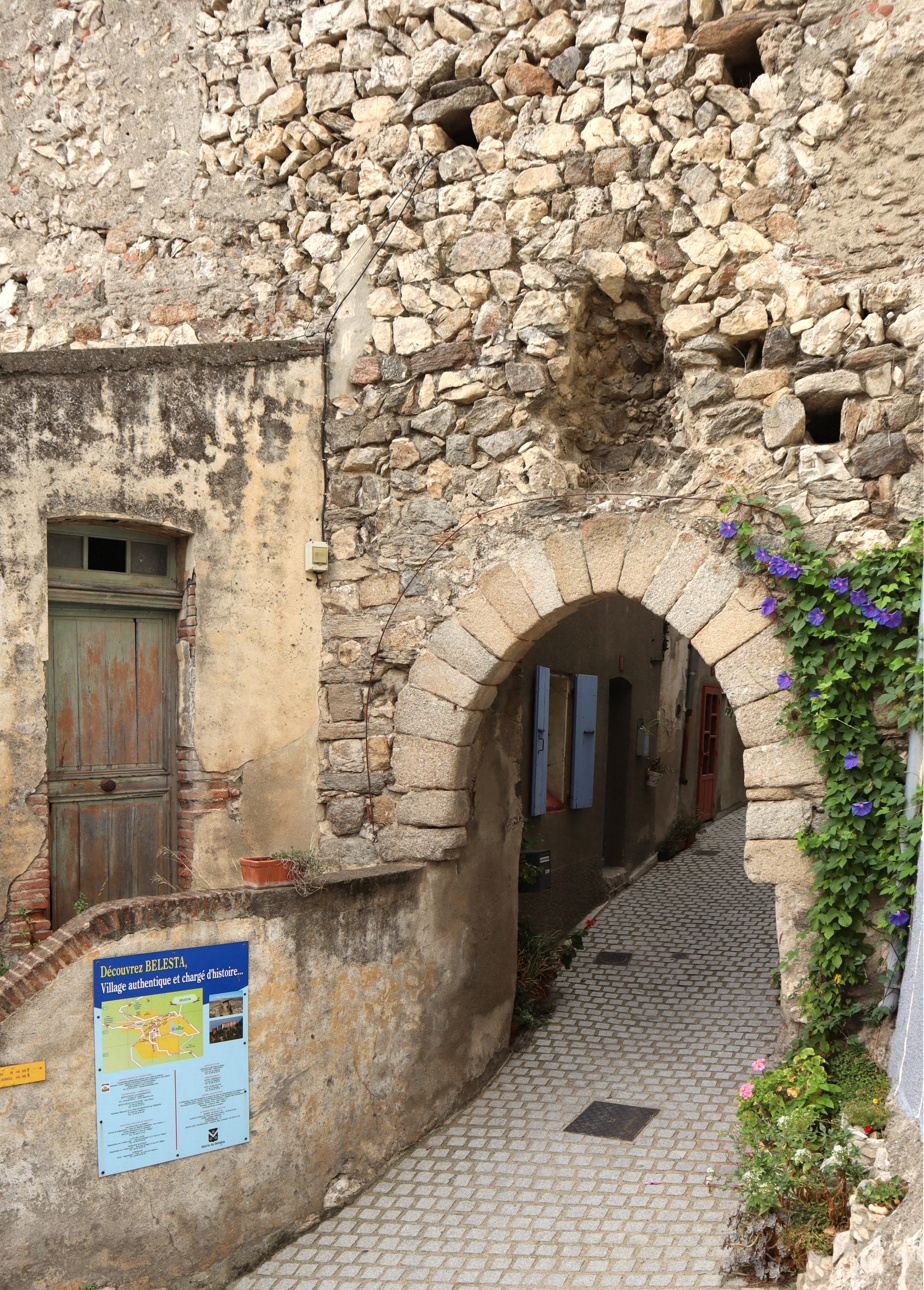
Medieval gate

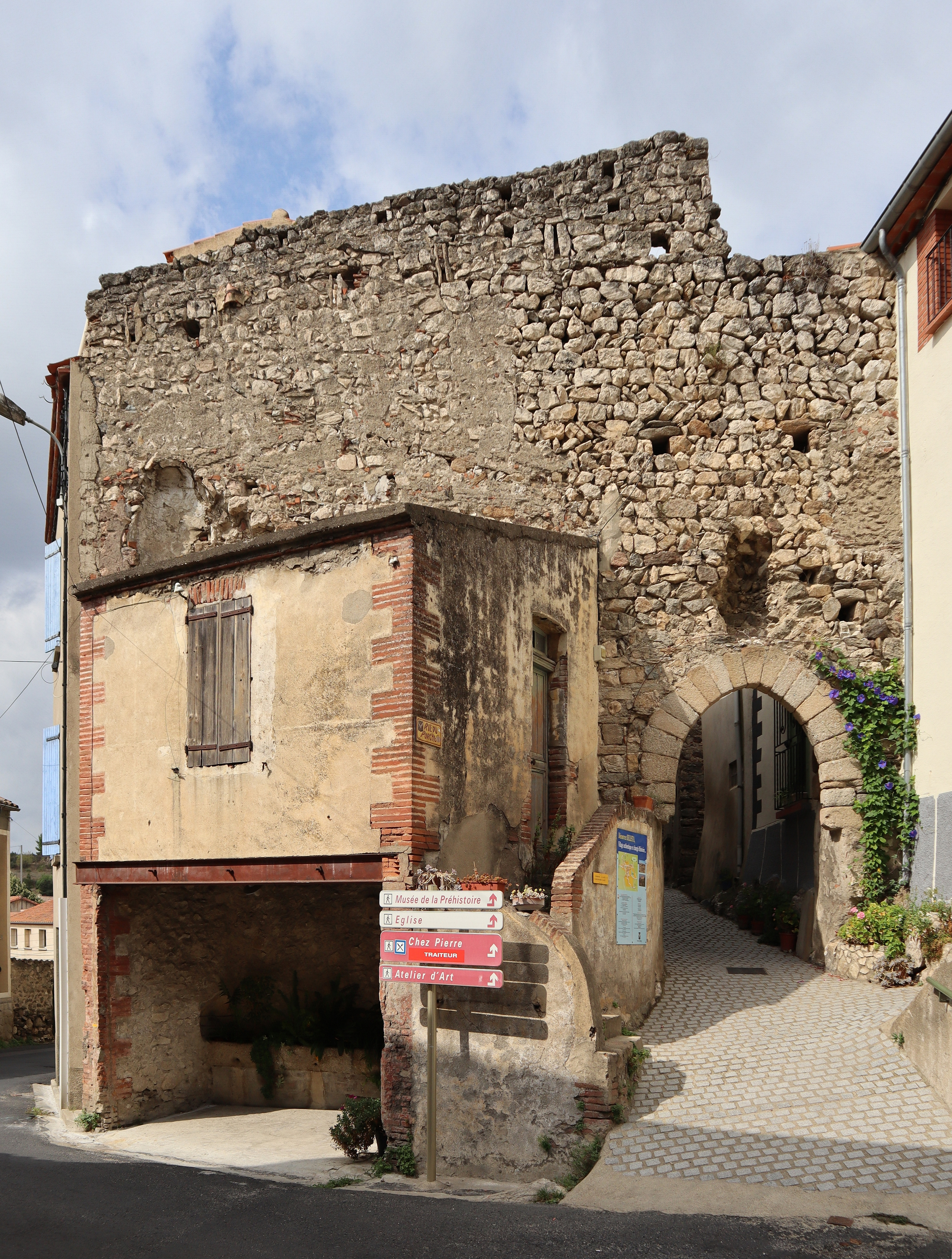
Ancien fortification

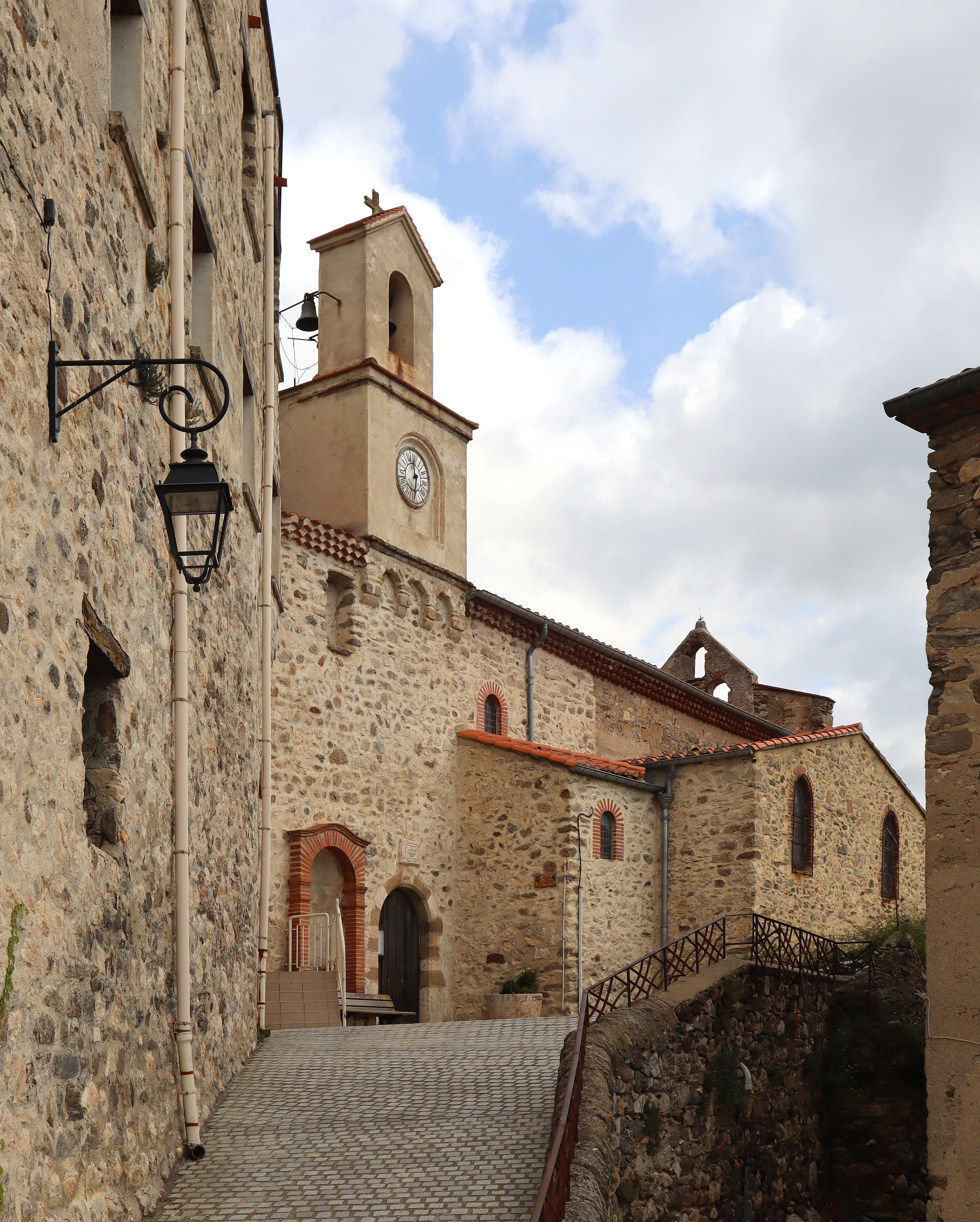
Church of Saint Barthelemy de Bélesta church (west)

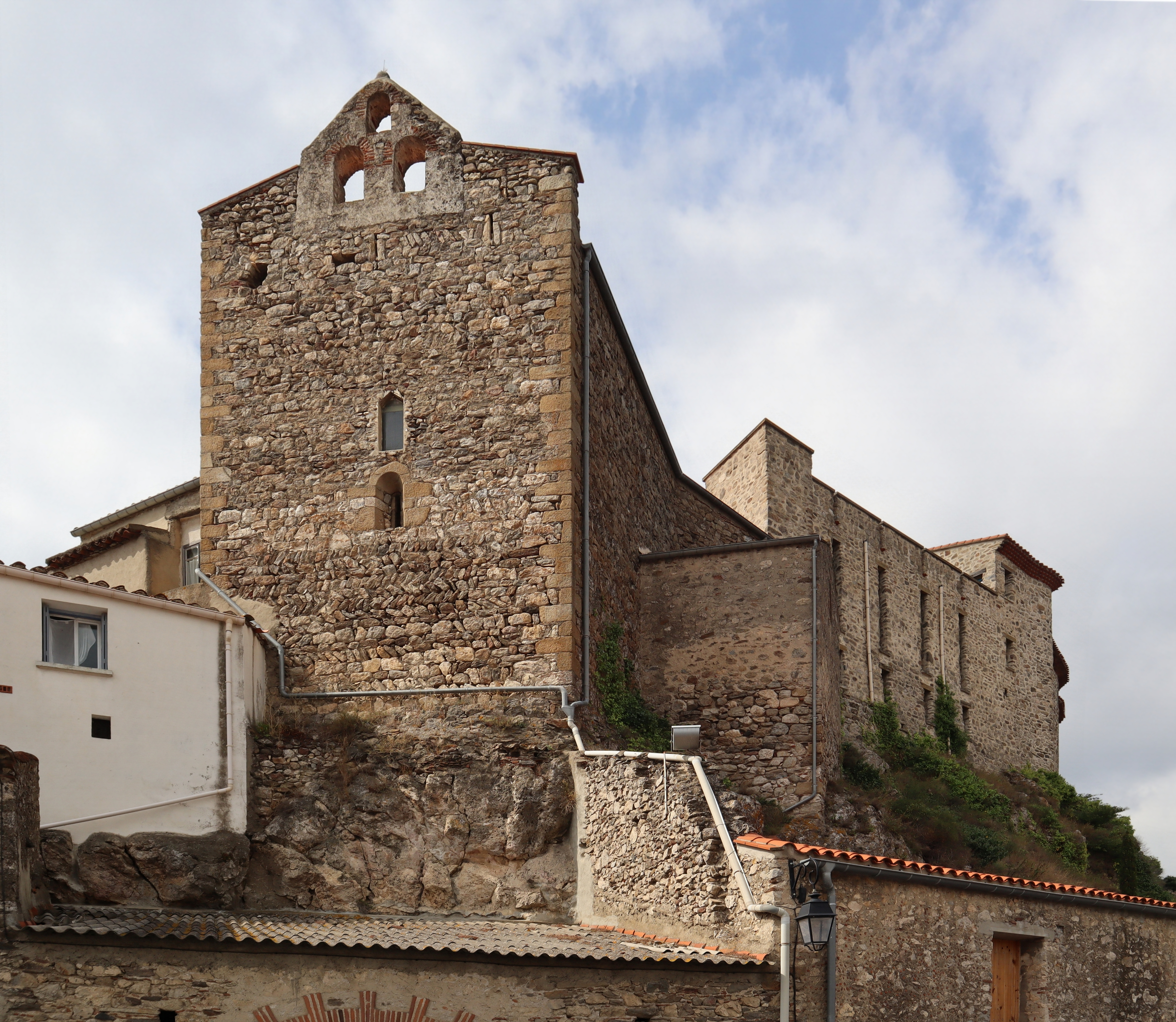
Church of Saint Barthelemy de Bélesta church (northeast)

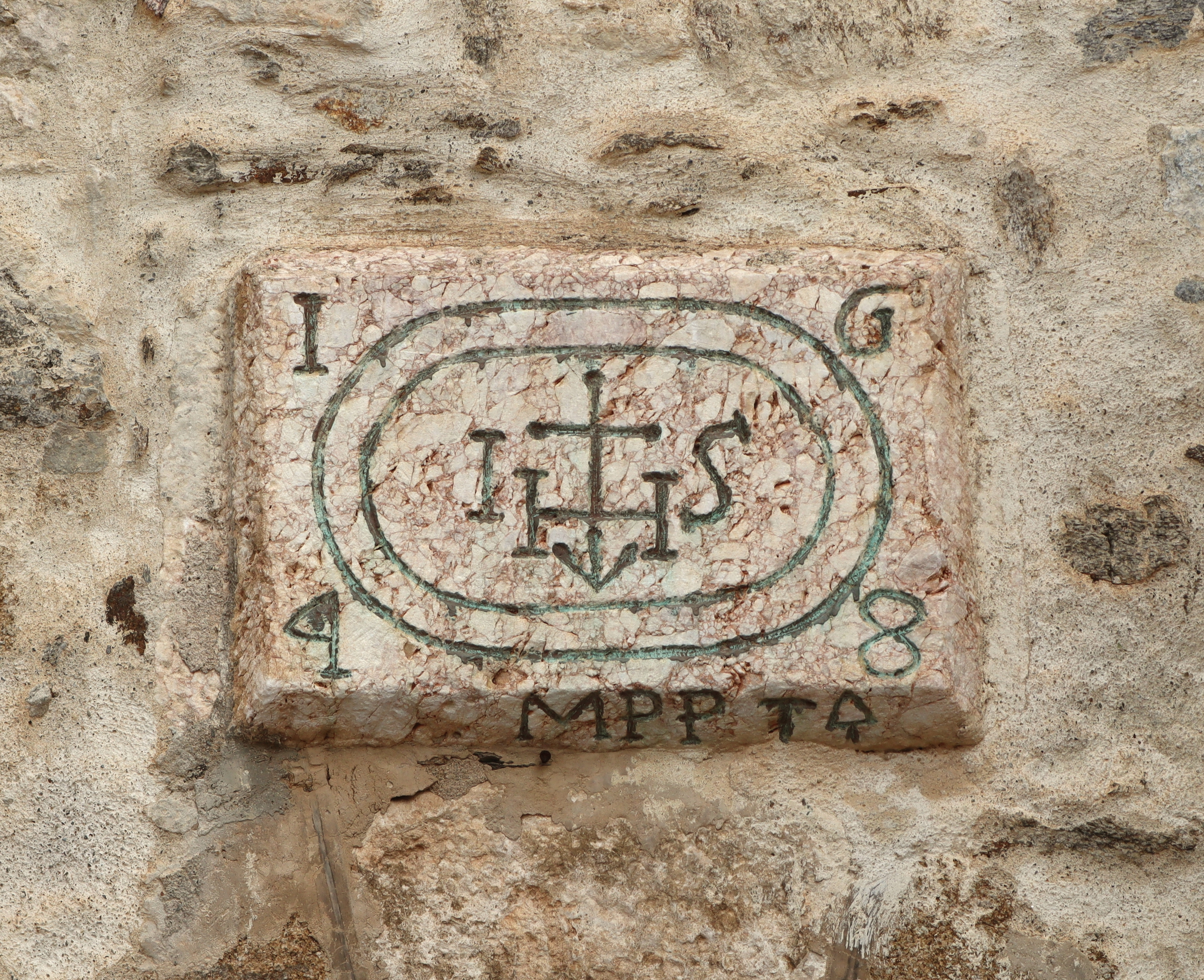
Inscription above the portal of Saint-Barthélemy de Bélesta church, dated 1648

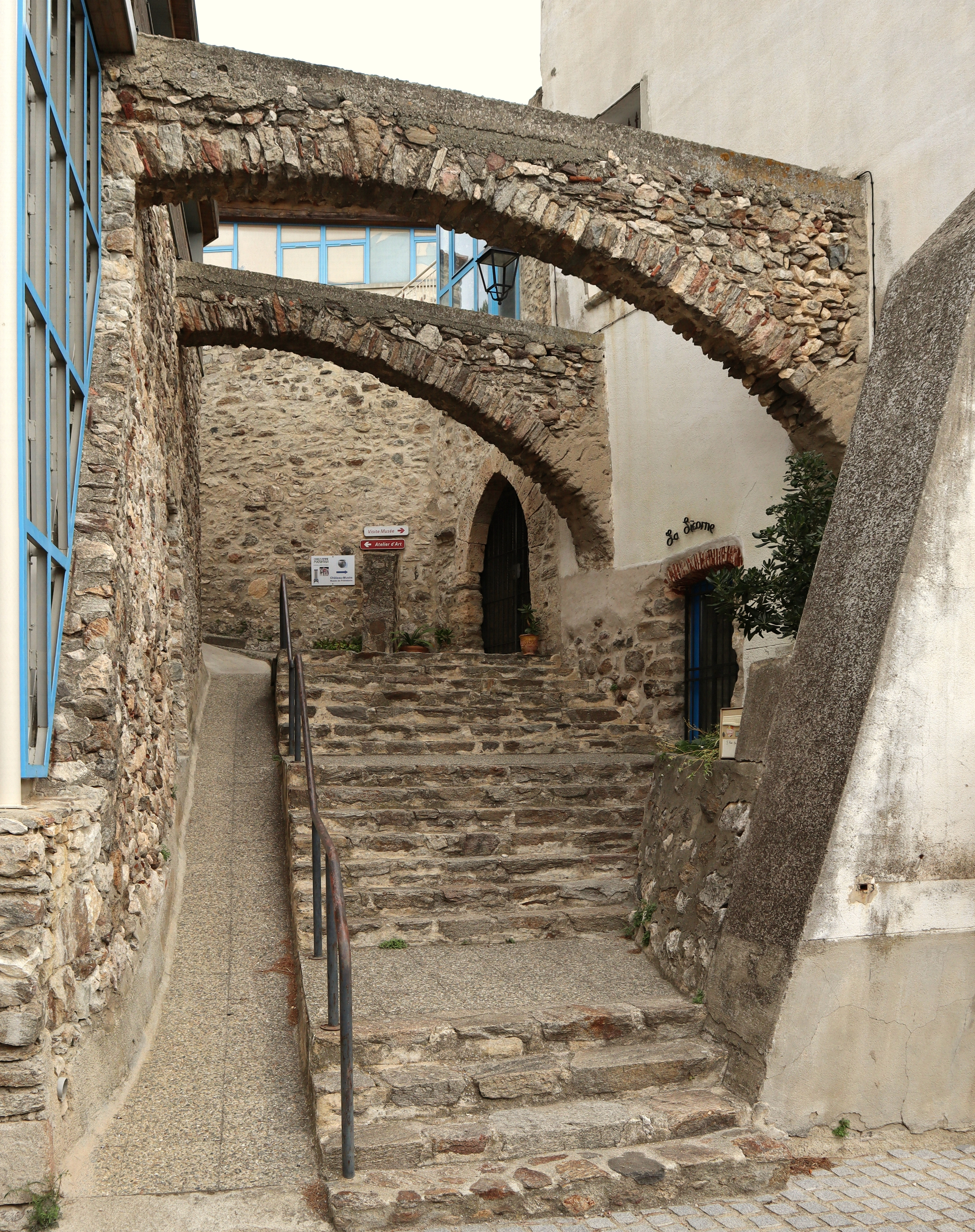
Museum of prehistory

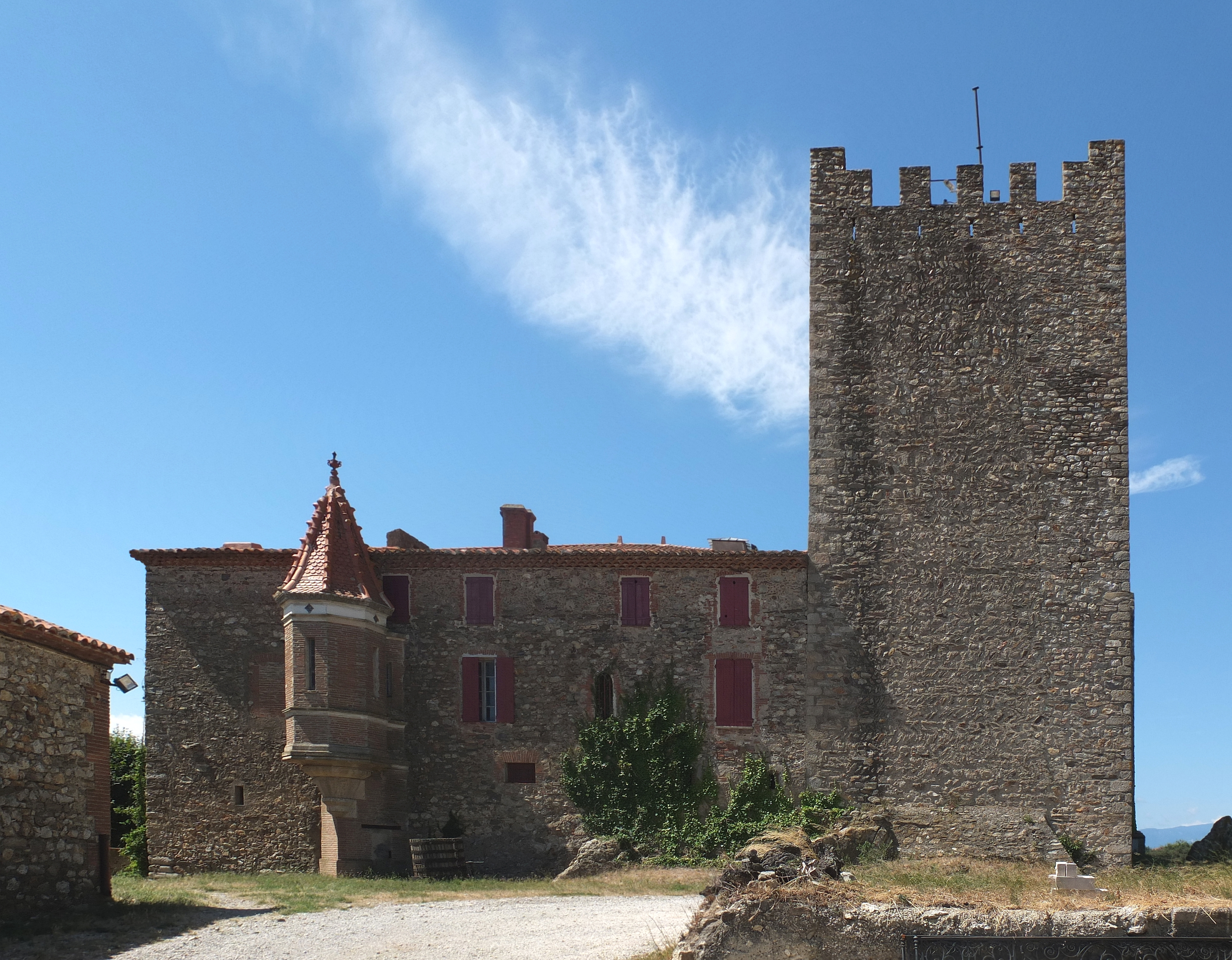
Château de Caladroy

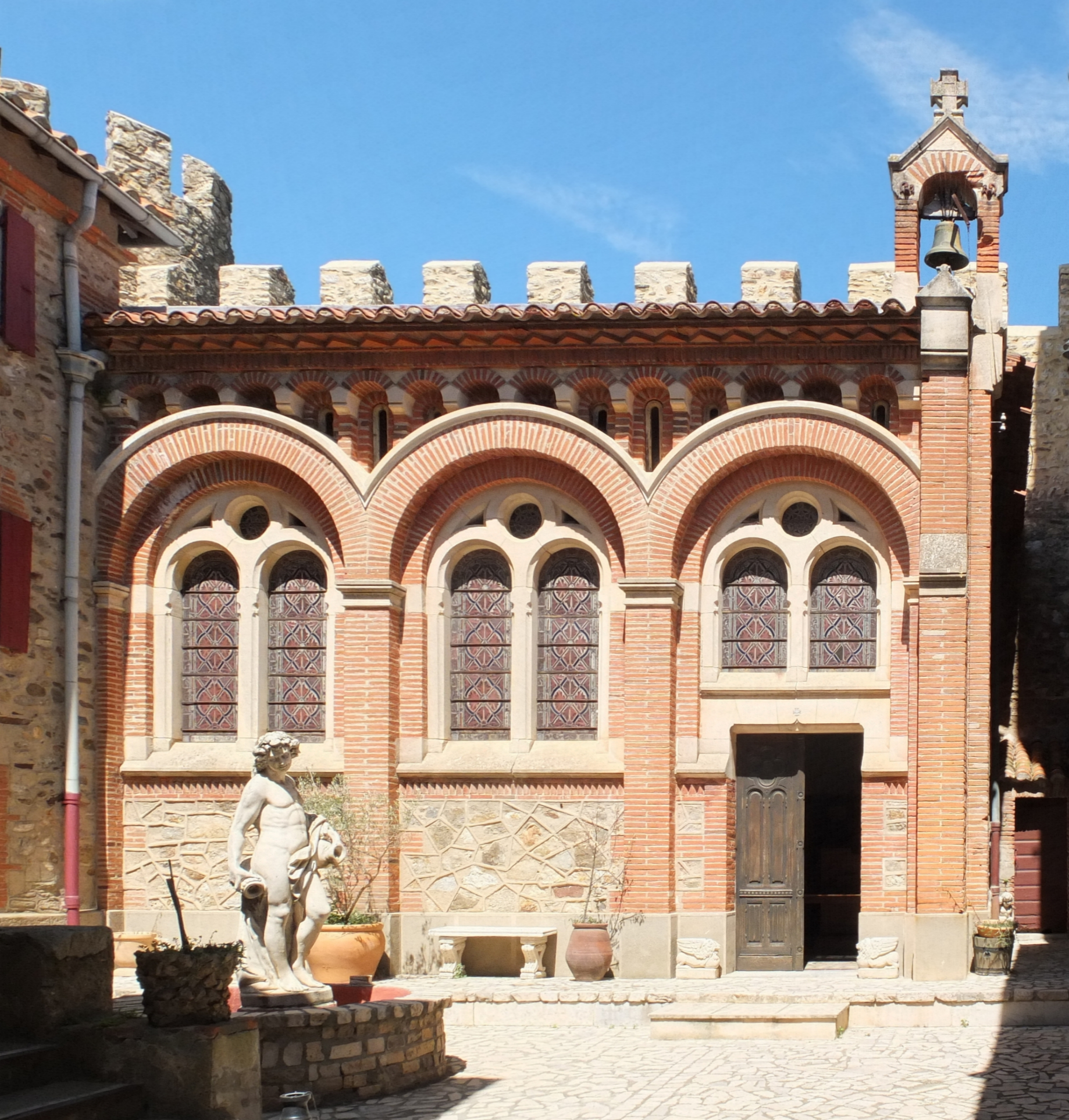
Chapel Sacré-Cœur de Jésus of château de Caladroy

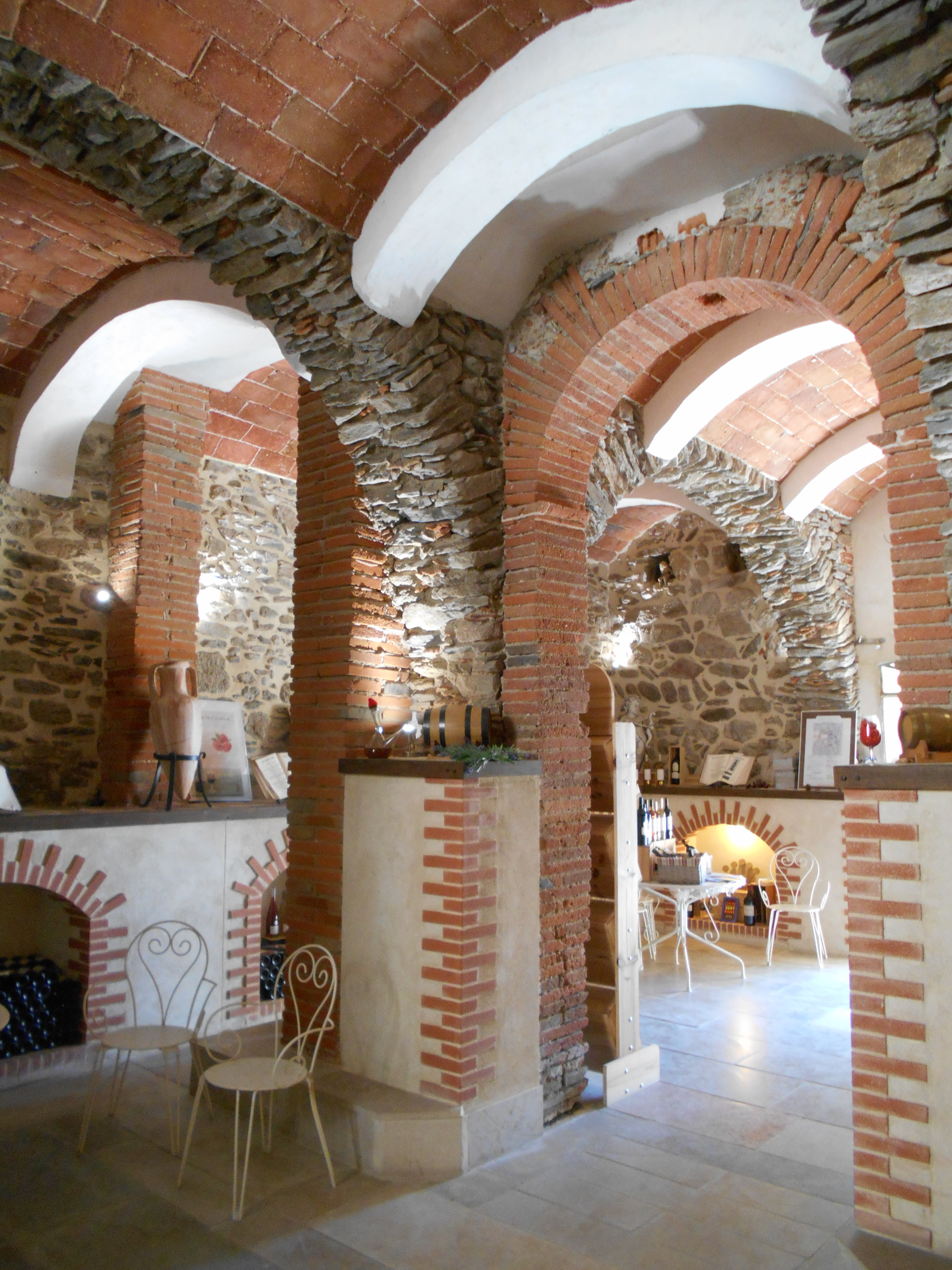
Chapel Saint-Michel of château de Caladroy

== See also ==
- Communes of the Pyrénées-Orientales department
