= Vira, Pyrénées-Orientales =

Vira Viran
- Commune
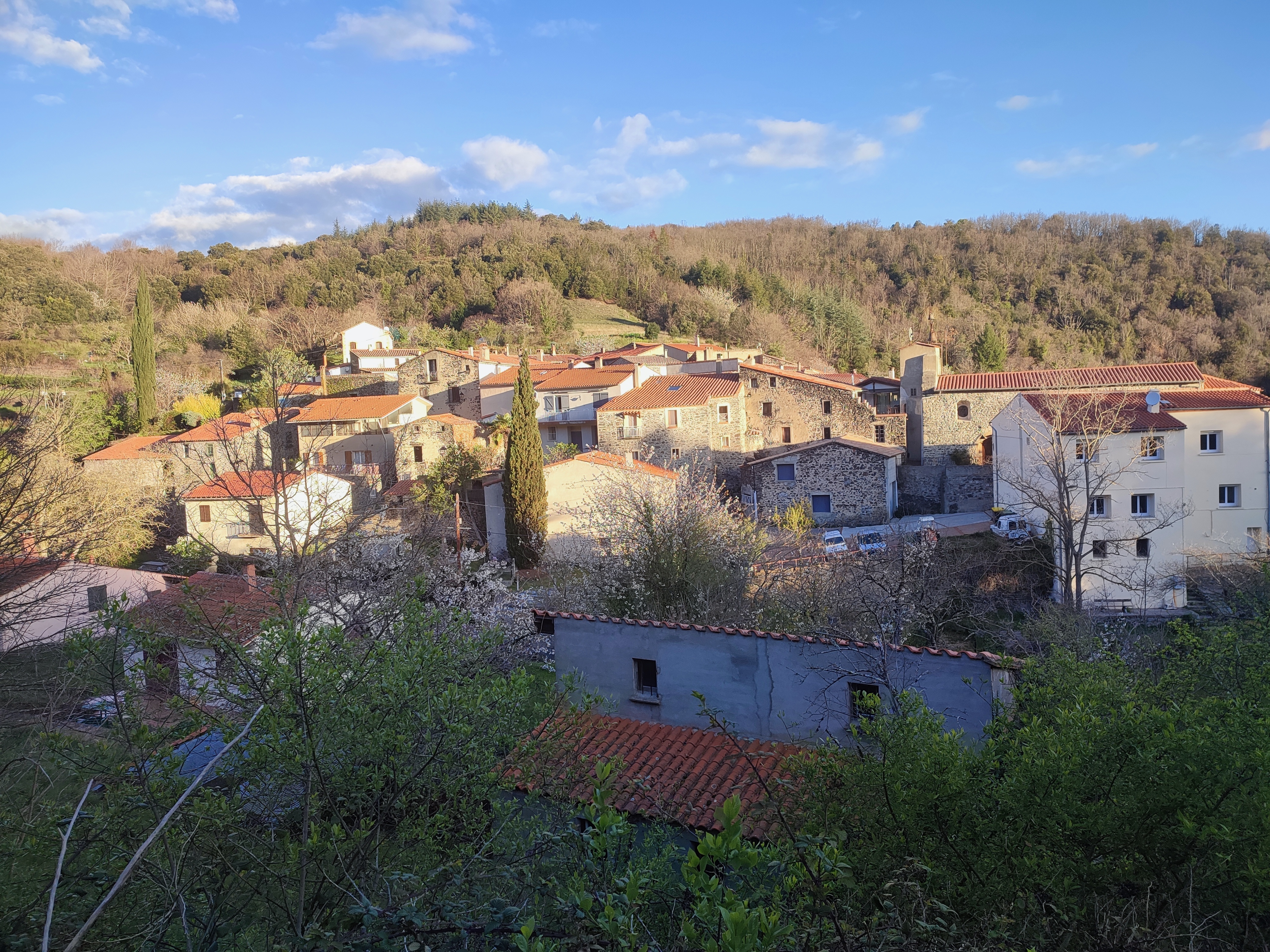
- Vira, early morning sun

- Coat of arms
- Location of Vira
- Location within France Location within Occitanie
- Coordinates: 42°46′16″N 2°24′53″E
- Country: France
- Region: Occitania
- Department: Pyrénées-Orientales
- Arrondissement: Prades
- Canton: La Vallée de l'Agly
- Intercommunality: Agly Fenouillèdes

Government
  - Mayor (2020–2026): Pierre Pineiro
- Area^{1}: 12.96 km^{2} (5.00 sq mi)
- Elevation: 668 m (2,192 ft)
- Highest elevation: 1,288 m (4,226 ft)
- Lowest elevation: 508 m (1,667 ft)
- Population (2023): 29
  - Density: 2.2/km^{2} (5.8/sq mi)
- Time zone: UTC+01:00 (CET)
  - Summer (DST): UTC+02:00 (CEST)
- INSEE/Postal code: 66232 /66220
- ^{1} French Land Register data, which excludes lakes, ponds, glaciers > 1 km^{2} (0.386 sq mi or 247 acres) and river estuaries.

Vira (French pronunciation: [viʁa]; Occitan: Viran) is a commune in the Pyrénées-Orientales department in southern France.

== Geography ==
Vira is located in the canton of La Vallée de l'Agly and in the arrondissement of Perpignan.

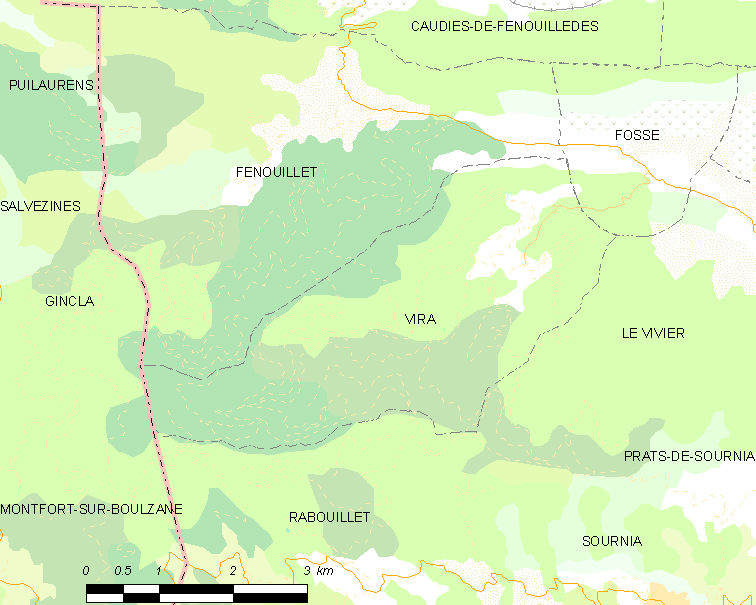
Map of Vira and its surrounding communes

== Population ==
Historical population
Year	Pop.	±% p.a.
1968	34	—
1975	23	−5.43%
1982	42	+8.98%
1990	32	−3.34%
1999	29	−1.09%
2007	33	+1.63%
2012	29	−2.55%
2017	26	−2.16%
2023	29	+1.84%
Source: INSEE

== See also ==
- Communes of the Pyrénées-Orientales department
