= Lesquerde =

Lesquerde L'Esquerda
- Commune
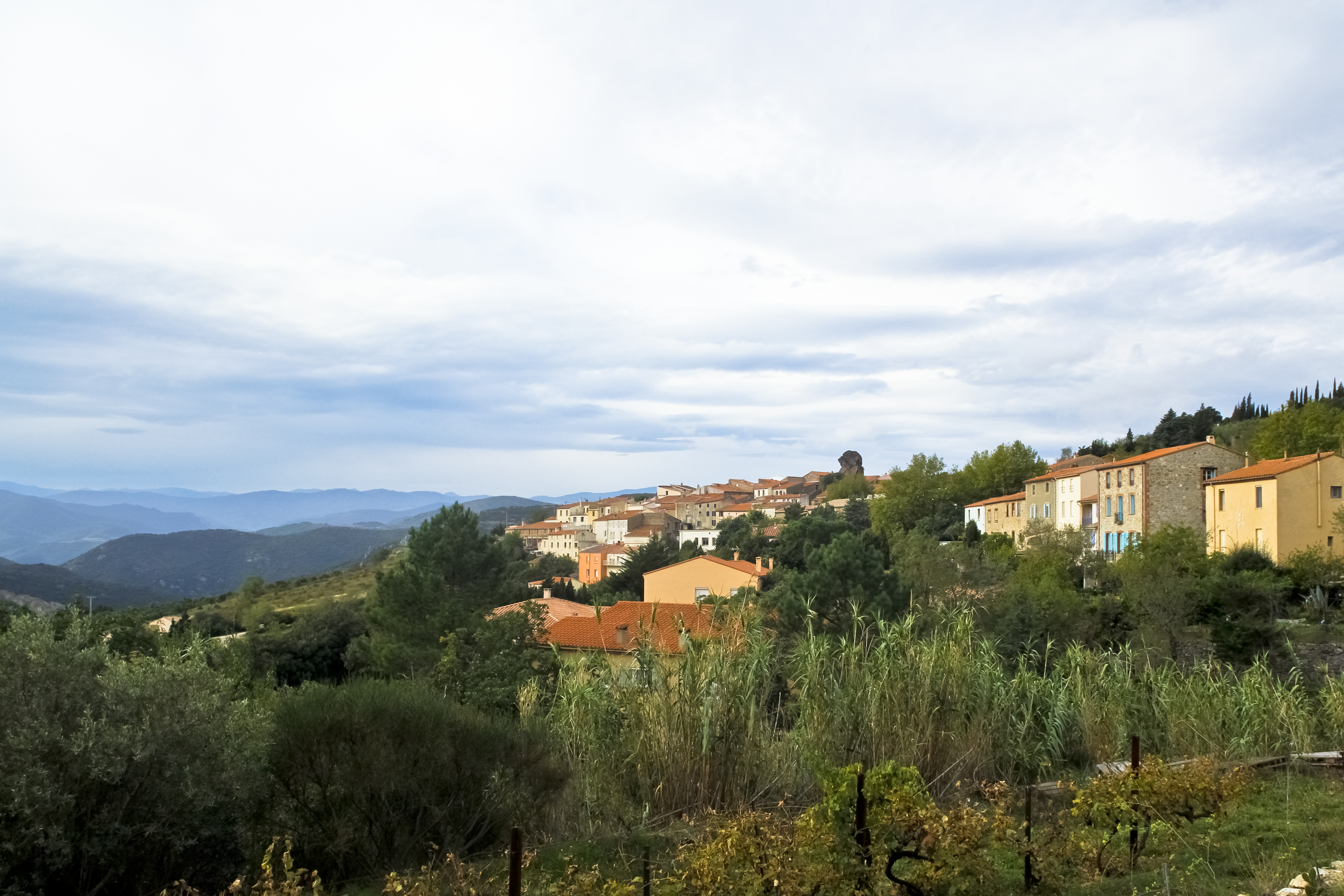
- A general view of Lesquerde

- Coat of arms
- Location of Lesquerde
- Location within France Location within Occitanie
- Coordinates: 42°48′07″N 2°31′49″E
- Country: France
- Region: Occitania
- Department: Pyrénées-Orientales
- Arrondissement: Prades
- Canton: La Vallée de l'Agly
- Intercommunality: Agly Fenouillèdes

Government
  - Mayor (2020–2026): Jacques Barthes
- Area^{1}: 15.67 km^{2} (6.05 sq mi)
- Elevation: 350 m (1,150 ft)
- Highest elevation: 600 m (2,000 ft)
- Lowest elevation: 216 m (709 ft)
- Population (2023): 141
  - Density: 9.00/km^{2} (23.3/sq mi)
- Time zone: UTC+01:00 (CET)
  - Summer (DST): UTC+02:00 (CEST)
- INSEE/Postal code: 66097 /66220
- ^{1} French Land Register data, which excludes lakes, ponds, glaciers > 1 km^{2} (0.386 sq mi or 247 acres) and river estuaries.

Lesquerde (French pronunciation: [lɛskɛʁd]; Occitan: L'Esquèrda; Catalan: L'Esquerda) is a commune in the Pyrénées-Orientales department in southern France.

== Geography ==
Lesquerde is located in the canton of La Vallée de l'Agly and in the arrondissement of Perpignan.

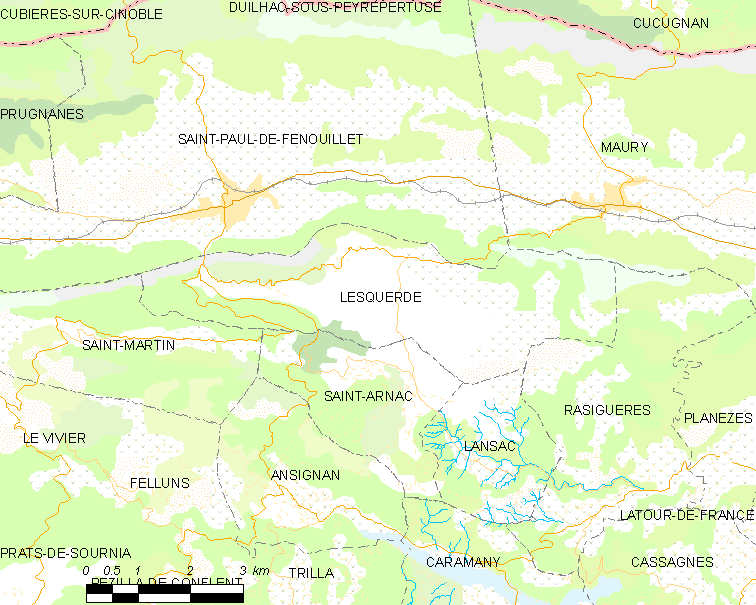
Map of Lesquerde and its surrounding communes

== Population ==
Historical population
| Year | Pop. | ±% p.a. |
|---|---|---|
| 1968 | 211 | — |
| 1975 | 172 | −2.88% |
| 1982 | 149 | −2.03% |
| 1990 | 124 | −2.27% |
| 1999 | 133 | +0.78% |
| 2007 | 152 | +1.68% |
| 2012 | 164 | +1.53% |
| 2017 | 133 | −4.10% |
| 2023 | 141 | +0.98% |
Source: INSEE

== See also ==
- Communes of the Pyrénées-Orientales department
