= Vingrau =

- Commune
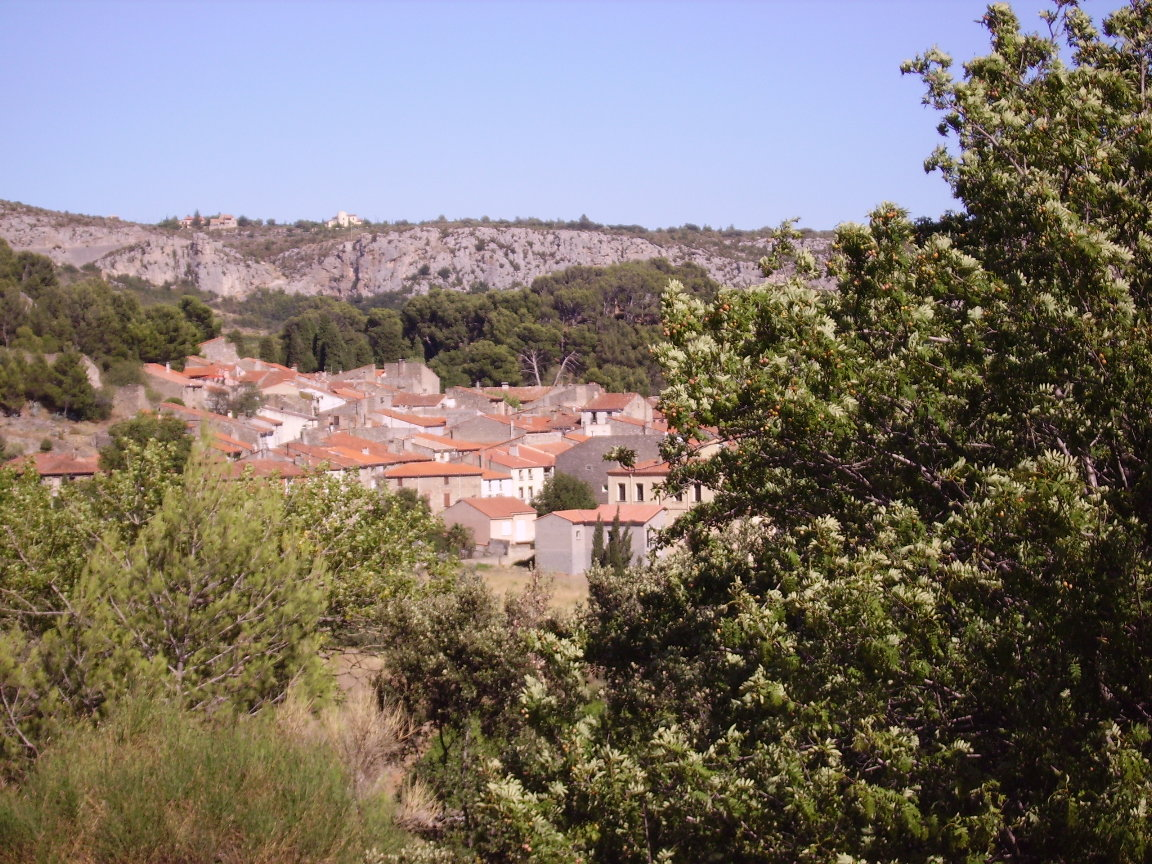
- A general view of Vingrau

- Coat of arms
- Location of Vingrau
- Location within France Location within Occitanie
- Coordinates: 42°50′56″N 2°46′45″E
- Country: France
- Region: Occitania
- Department: Pyrénées-Orientales
- Arrondissement: Perpignan
- Canton: La Vallée de l'Agly
- Intercommunality: Perpignan Méditerranée Métropole

Government
  - Mayor (2020–2026): Philippe Camps
- Area^{1}: 32.12 km^{2} (12.40 sq mi)
- Elevation: 322 m (1,056 ft)
- Highest elevation: 575 m (1,886 ft)
- Lowest elevation: 119 m (390 ft)
- Population (2023): 536
  - Density: 16.7/km^{2} (43.2/sq mi)
- Time zone: UTC+01:00 (CET)
  - Summer (DST): UTC+02:00 (CEST)
- INSEE/Postal code: 66231 /66600
- ^{1} French Land Register data, which excludes lakes, ponds, glaciers > 1 km^{2} (0.386 sq mi or 247 acres) and river estuaries.

Vingrau (French pronunciation: [vɛ̃ɡʁo]; Occitan: Vingrau) is a commune in the Pyrénées-Orientales department in southern France.

== Geography ==
Vingrau is located in the canton of La Vallée de l'Agly and in the arrondissement of Perpignan.

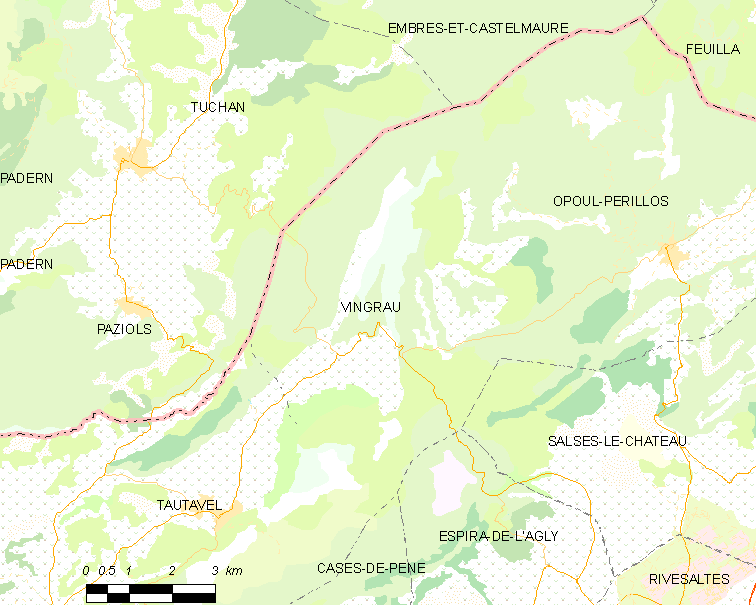
Map of Vingrau and its surrounding communes

== History ==
The townhall of Vingrau was destroyed by a fire in 1935, with all the municipal archives, and causing the death of a local roadman.

== Population ==
Historical population
| Year | Pop. | ±% p.a. |
|---|---|---|
| 1968 | 563 | — |
| 1975 | 490 | −1.96% |
| 1982 | 475 | −0.44% |
| 1990 | 426 | −1.35% |
| 1999 | 469 | +1.07% |
| 2007 | 565 | +2.36% |
| 2012 | 644 | +2.65% |
| 2017 | 606 | −1.21% |
| 2023 | 536 | −2.02% |
Source: INSEE

== See also ==
- Communes of the Pyrénées-Orientales department
