= Prugnanes =

Prugnanes Prunyanes Prunhanas
- Commune
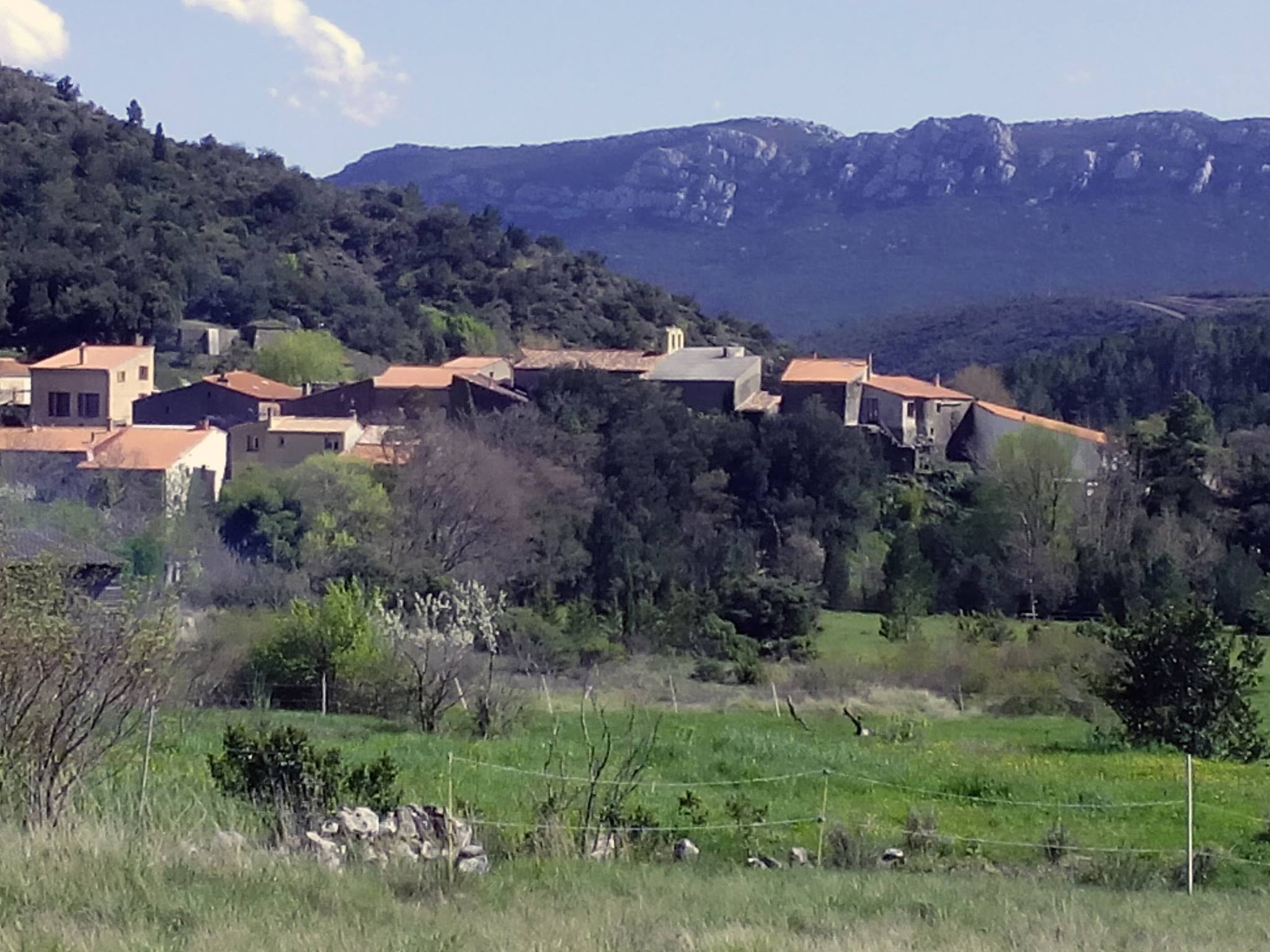
- Location of Prugnanes
- Location within France Location within Occitanie
- Coordinates: 42°49′32″N 2°26′02″E
- Country: France
- Region: Occitania
- Department: Pyrénées-Orientales
- Arrondissement: Prades
- Canton: La Vallée de l'Agly
- Intercommunality: Agly Fenouillèdes

Government
  - Mayor (2020–2026): Pierre-Henri Bintein
- Area^{1}: 13.51 km^{2} (5.22 sq mi)
- Elevation: 403 m (1,322 ft)
- Highest elevation: 909 m (2,982 ft)
- Lowest elevation: 272 m (892 ft)
- Population (2023): 90
  - Density: 6.7/km^{2} (17/sq mi)
- Time zone: UTC+01:00 (CET)
  - Summer (DST): UTC+02:00 (CEST)
- INSEE/Postal code: 66152 /66220
- ^{1} French Land Register data, which excludes lakes, ponds, glaciers > 1 km^{2} (0.386 sq mi or 247 acres) and river estuaries.

Prugnanes (French pronunciation: [pʁyɲan]; Occitan: Prunhanas; Catalan: Prunyanes) is a commune in the Pyrénées-Orientales department in southern France.

== Geography ==
Prugnanes is in the canton of La Vallée de l'Agly and in the arrondissement of Perpignan.

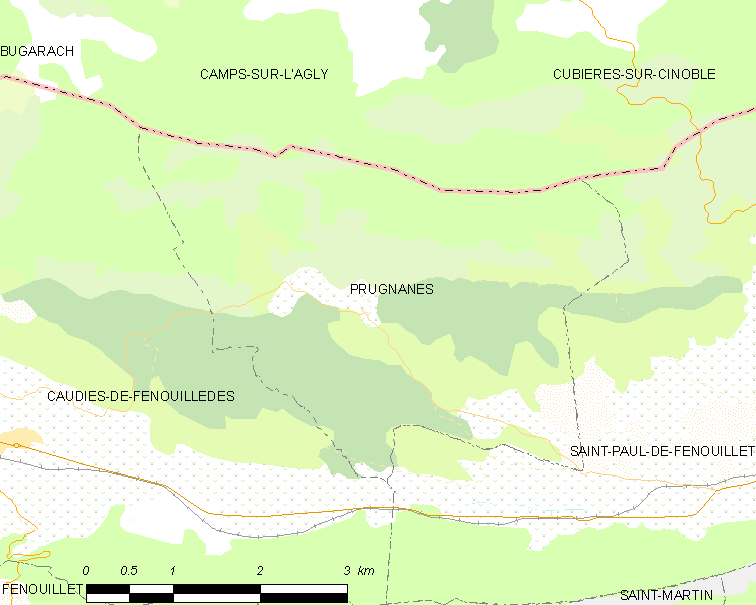
Map of Prugnanes and its surrounding communes

== Population ==
Historical population
Year	Pop.	±% p.a.
1968	85	—
1975	79	−1.04%
1982	65	−2.75%
1990	55	−2.07%
1999	69	+2.55%
2007	100	+4.75%
2012	102	+0.40%
2017	104	+0.39%
2023	90	−2.38%
Source: INSEE

== See also ==
- Communes of the Pyrénées-Orientales department
