= Lansac, Pyrénées-Orientales =

Lansac
- Commune
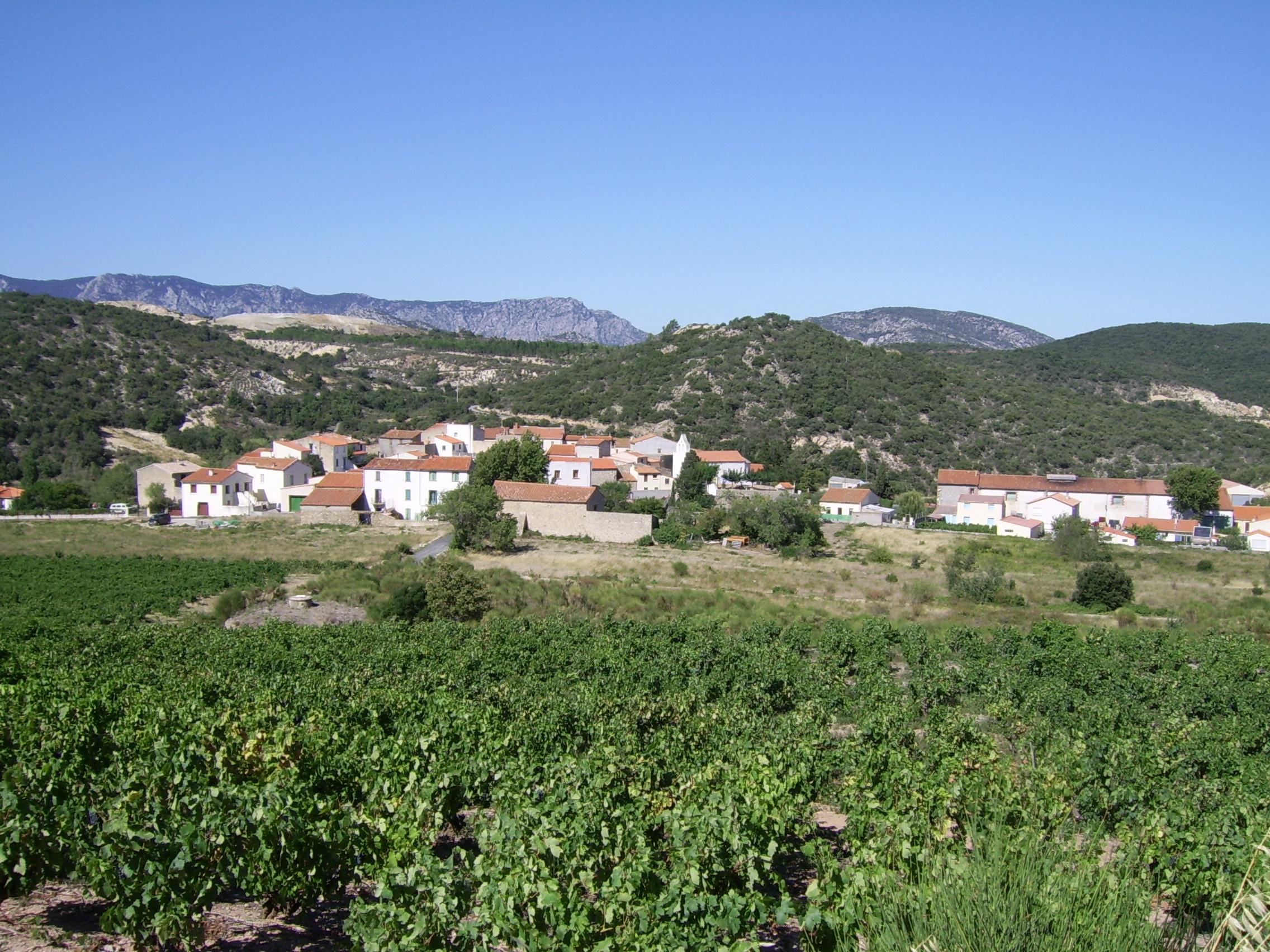
- A general view of Lansac

- Coat of arms
- Location of Lansac
- Location within France Location within Occitanie
- Coordinates: 42°46′00″N 2°33′42″E
- Country: France
- Region: Occitania
- Department: Pyrénées-Orientales
- Arrondissement: Prades
- Canton: La Vallée de l'Agly
- Intercommunality: Agly Fenouillèdes

Government
  - Mayor (2020–2026): Virginie Lee
- Area^{1}: 5.20 km^{2} (2.01 sq mi)
- Elevation: 333 m (1,093 ft)
- Highest elevation: 481 m (1,578 ft)
- Lowest elevation: 218 m (715 ft)
- Population (2023): 89
  - Density: 17/km^{2} (44/sq mi)
- Time zone: UTC+01:00 (CET)
  - Summer (DST): UTC+02:00 (CEST)
- INSEE/Postal code: 66092 /66720
- ^{1} French Land Register data, which excludes lakes, ponds, glaciers > 1 km^{2} (0.386 sq mi or 247 acres) and river estuaries.

Lansac (French pronunciation: [lɑ̃sak]; Occitan: Lançac) is a commune in the Pyrénées-Orientales department in southern France.

== Geography ==
Lansac is located in the canton of La Vallée de l'Agly and in the arrondissement of Perpignan.

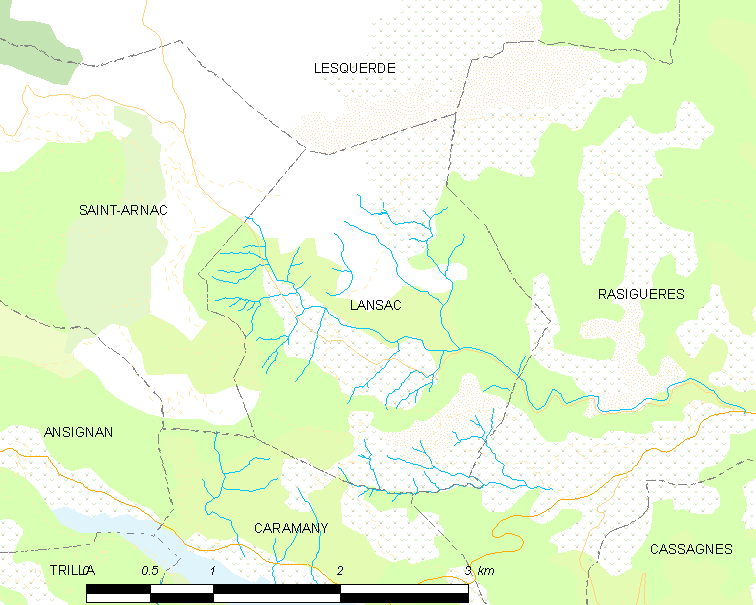
Map of Lansac and its surrounding communes

== Population ==
Historical population
Year	Pop.	±% p.a.
1968	117	—
1975	86	−4.30%
1982	80	−1.03%
1990	79	−0.16%
1999	76	−0.43%
2007	99	+3.36%
2012	107	+1.57%
2017	89	−3.62%
2023	89	+0.00%
Source: INSEE

== See also ==
- Communes of the Pyrénées-Orientales department
