= Saint-Martin-de-Fenouillet =

Saint-Martin-de-Fenouillet Sant Martin de Fenolhet
- Commune
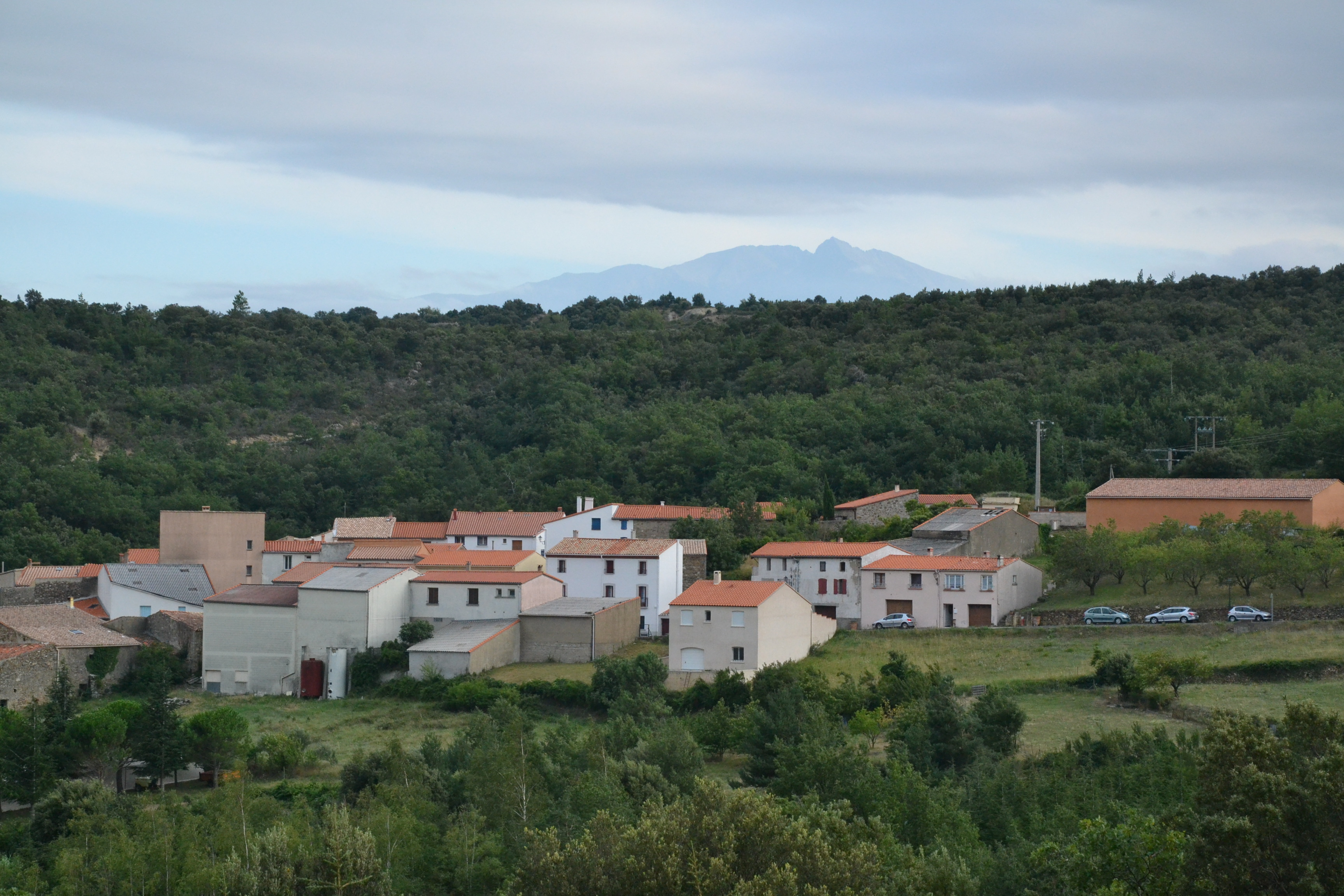
- The village of Saint-Martin-de-Fenouillet, with the Canigó in the background
- Location of Saint-Martin-de-Fenouillet
- Location within France Location within Occitanie
- Coordinates: 42°47′12″N 2°28′09″E
- Country: France
- Region: Occitania
- Department: Pyrénées-Orientales
- Arrondissement: Prades
- Canton: La Vallée de l'Agly
- Intercommunality: Agly Fenouillèdes

Government
  - Mayor (2020–2026): Jacques Larroche
- Area^{1}: 10.72 km^{2} (4.14 sq mi)
- Elevation: 438 m (1,437 ft)
- Highest elevation: 642 m (2,106 ft)
- Lowest elevation: 268 m (879 ft)
- Population (2023): 49
  - Density: 4.6/km^{2} (12/sq mi)
- Time zone: UTC+01:00 (CET)
  - Summer (DST): UTC+02:00 (CEST)
- INSEE/Postal code: 66184 /66220
- ^{1} French Land Register data, which excludes lakes, ponds, glaciers > 1 km^{2} (0.386 sq mi or 247 acres) and river estuaries.

Saint-Martin-de-Fenouillet (French pronunciation: [sɛ̃ maʁtɛ̃ də fənujɛ]; before 2014: Saint-Martin; Languedocien: Sant Martin d'Endalens) is a commune in the Pyrénées-Orientales department in southern France.

== Geography ==
Saint-Martin-de-Fenouillet is located in the canton of La Vallée de l'Agly and in the arrondissement of Perpignan.

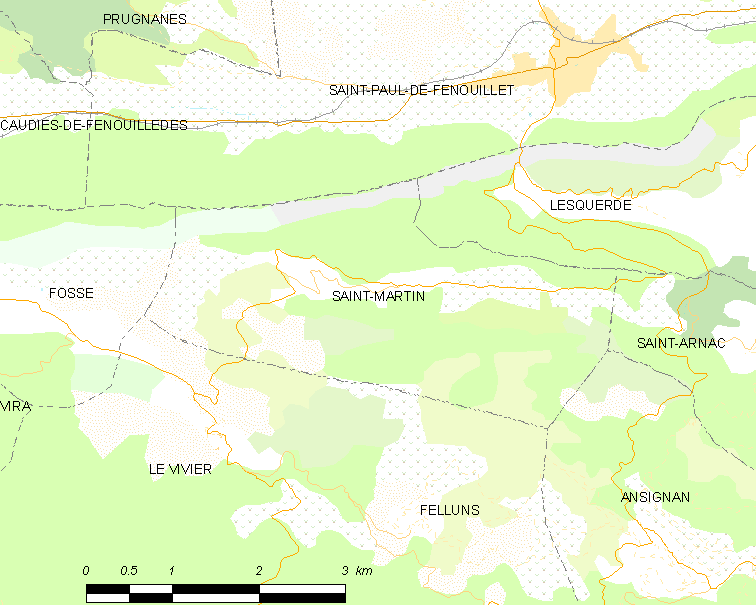
Map of Saint-Martin-de-Fenouillet and its surrounding communes

== Population ==
Historical population
Year	Pop.	±% p.a.
1968	116	—
1975	91	−3.41%
1982	58	−6.23%
1990	52	−1.36%
1999	47	−1.12%
2007	54	+1.75%
2012	58	+1.44%
2017	55	−1.06%
2023	49	−1.91%
Source: INSEE

== See also ==
- Communes of the Pyrénées-Orientales department
