= Megalithic sites in Pyrénées-Orientales =

Ancient stone structures in France

The megalithic sites of the Pyrénées-Orientales are a group of 148 dolmens and 4 menhirs located in the French department of Pyrénées-Orientales.

== Natural surroundings ==
The Pyrénées-Orientales department is located in the extreme south of France, eastern section of the Pyrenees mountain range and the Plaine du Roussillon. The mountainous region of the county consists of the Albera massif to the southeast, the Corbières massif to the north, and the historic regions of Vallespir, Conflent, Cerdagne, and Capcir, which make up almost 50% of the department's total area.

The Roussillon plain lacks any megaliths. These stone structures are generally situated at elevated positions, such as on ridges, passes or flat areas and frequently function as borders between communes that were once villages. Dolmens have served as boundary markers since at least the early Middle Ages.

The rock materials used to construct these monuments, including gneiss, granite, and limestone, are readily available at dolmen sites. Apart from the limestone Corbières massif, the soils in this area tend to be acidic.

== Characteristics ==
Unlike the dolmens in the neighboring Aude department or Spain's Alt Empordà, those found in the Pyrénées-Orientales are diminutive in size. The largest one is the Balma de Na Cristiana.

For the most part, they feature a basic rectangular layout, with a chevet slab bearing two side slabs, all of which are covered by a single slab. The fourth side is left open to act as the entrance to the dolmen, which could have a wooden or stone opening mechanism. Few dolmens are larger and have a corridor due to the extension of side slabs, giving them an elongated shape.

However, these original designs underwent modifications over the years. Not a single dolmen has been discovered intact, all have been looted, emptied, and reused, sometimes as early as prehistoric or ancient times. Slabs have frequently been relocated or destroyed.

Many dolmens bear cupules that are often connected by engraved gutters. Sometimes, they are associated with cross-shaped engravings. Unadorned dolmens may be accompanied by nearby engraved rocks.

Most organic remains have been destroyed by the acidity of the soil.

== List ==
In his 2011 publication, Jean Abélanet outlines 147 dolmens in the Pyrénées-Orientales, along with 5 menhirs, including those mentioned in ancient sources but not yet discovered. The Dolmen de Castelló discovered in 2011 is not included. Carreras and Tarrús completed their list in 2012, documenting 125 megalithic sites, 114 burials, and 10 menhirs, in addition to one necropolis. They identify 19 sites as potentially false or doubtful. The Castelló dolmen is also omitted from their count. In 2017, Carreras and Tarrus published an article that lists megaliths discovered between 1999 and 2015 in the county and neighboring Alt Empordà. Three megaliths were found in the Pyrenees-Orientales.

The authors unanimously agree that the Statue-menhir de Caramat is not a statue-menhir.

Dolmens in the Pyrenees-Orientales are typically situated in hilly or mountainous areas of the department, usually on a col, ridge, or high ground. In Jean Abélanet's book, coordinates in Lambert III format were provided, but this format has proven problematic as a majority of the coordinates are incorrect.

The following list consists of six columns:

1. the name of the monument, with any variants and the sources of the assertions (Abélanet 2011 and Carreras and Tarrús 2013 in general);
2. type of monument (dolmen, menhir...);
3. an "Authors" column giving the names of the first authors to have published the monument. When Jean Abélanet or Carreras et Tarrús dispute the status of a megalithic monument, this is indicated by a No;
4. the commune in which the monument is located;
5. the GPS coordinates given by Carreras and Tarrús
6. if available, an illustration.

Megalith	Type	Authors	Commune	Coordinates	Illustration
Dolmen de Las Apostados or dolmen dels Apostadors	dolmen	Vigo 1961	Trilla	42°44′56″N 2°31′13″E	
Arca de la Font Roja	disappeared dolmen	Ponsich 1949	Caixas	in process of geolocalization	
Arca de Calahons, called dolmen de l'Arca de Calahons or dolmen de Calahons II	Simple dolmen (cist)	Abélanet 1970	Catllar, boundary with Molitg-les-Bains and Eus	42°39′25″N 2°25′4″E	
Balma de Na Cristiana	dolmen	Jaubert de Passa 1847 (attributed to Pallary 1887 by Abélanet)	L'Albère	42°29′4″N 2°53′14″E	
Balma del Moro	dolmen	Jaubert de Réart 1835	Laroque-des-Albères	42°29′59″N 2°56′27″E	
La Barraca (dolmen), or Dolmen 1 du Mas Llussanes or Barraca del Mas Llussanés	dolmen	Vidal 1921	Tarerach	42°40′22″N 2°30′42″E	
Dolmen de Bohera	dolmen	Abélanet 1970	Prades	42°35′39″N 2°25′49″E	
Dolmen de La Borda	dolmen	Abélanet, Cura and Padró 1975	Eyne	42°29′9″N 2°4′36″E	
Cabana del Moro	dolmen	Jaubert de Réart 1832	Llauro	42°33′11″N 2°45′1″E	
Caixa del Camp de l'Obra	dolmen	Abélanet 1970	Taillet	42°31′50″N 2°39′54″E	
Caixa del Moro	dolmen	Jaubert de Réart 1832	Taulis	42°31′5″N 2°37′54″E	
Caixa de Rotllan	dolmen	Renard de Saint-Malo 1837	Arles-sur-Tech	42°28′52″N 2°36′4″E	
Caixeta	dolmen	Devaux 1934	Camélas	42°38′41″N 2°40′30″E	
Dolmen du Camp Gran I	dolmen		Saint-Michel-de-Llotes	in process of geolocalization	
Dolmen du Camp Gran II	dolmen		Bouleternère	in process of geolocalization	
Dolmen du Camp de Seris	destroyed dolmen		Reynès	42°30′19″N 2°41′35″E	
Caouno del Moro	dolmen		Feilluns	42°45′46″N 2°29′48″E	
Caseta	dolmen		Corsavy	42°29′13″N 2°33′14″E	
Dolmen du Castell de Bellpuig	dolmen		Prunet-et-Belpuig	42°33′35″N 2°37′6″E	
Dolmen de Castelló	dolmen		Prats-de-Mollo-la-Preste	42°25′15″N 2°27′58″E	
Dolmen de Cayenne	dolmen		Campoussy	42°40′50″N 2°27′20″E	
Cementiri dels Moros	dolmen		Boule-d'Amont	42°35′24″N 2°34′47″E	
Dolmen de Coberturat	dolmen		Corneilla-de-Conflent	42°34′3″N 2°22′2″E	
Dolmen du Coll de la Creu	dolmen		Clara-Villerach-Villerach	42°35′39″N 2°25′49″E	
Dolmen du Coll de la Farella	dolmen		Cerbère / Portbou (Spain)	42°26′25″N 3°7′53″E	
Dolmen du Coll de la Llosa	dolmen		Bouleternère / Casefabre / Saint-Michel-de-Llotes (boundary between the three communes)	42°37′52″N 2°36′18″E	
Dolmen du Coll de les Portes	dolmen		Cerbère	42°26′45″N 3°7′13″E	
Dolmen du Coll del Tribe	dolmen		Molitg-les-Bains	42°40′44″N 2°24′34″E	
Tumulus de Collada Verda	two tumulus		Py, Mantet, Prats-de-Mollo-la-Preste	42°27′30″N 2°24′10″E	
Collades (dolmen de les)	destroyed dolmen		Amélie-les-Bains-Palalda, Maçanet de Cabrenys	42°24′45″N 2°42′16″E	
Dolmen des Collets de Cotlliure	dolmen		Argelès-sur-Mer	42°31′15″N 3°2′0″E	
Dolmen de las Colombinos	dolmen		Trilla	42°44′55″N 2°31′54″E	
Dolmen de las Coma Enestapera	dolmen		Cerbère	42°27′8″N 3°8′32″E	
Dolmen du Correc de Montou	destroyed dolmen		Camélas	42°38′58″N 2°40′54″E	
Cova de l'Alarb	dolmen		Banyuls-sur-Mer	42°27′39″N 3°3′20″E	
Cova de l'Alarb	dolmen		Collioure	42°30′16″N 3°3′26″E	
Cova de l'Alarb	dolmen		Argelès-sur-Mer	42°31′32″N 3°2′5″E	
Cova del Camp de la Marunya	dolmen	Diario 1913	Enveitg	42°28′54″N 1°54′20″E	
Cova d'en Rotllan	two dolmens		Corsavy	42°29′22″N 2°34′15″E	
Dolmen de la Creu de la Llosa	restored dolmen		Saint-Michel-de-Llotes	42°38′3″N 2°38′37″E	
Dolmen de la Creu del Senyal	destroyed dolmen		Le Boulou	42°30′20″N 2°51′46″E	
Dolmen de La Femno Morto	dolmen		Campoussy	42°41′2″N 2°26′3″E	
Dolmen de la Font de l'Arca	dolmen		Campoussy	42°42′14″N 2°26′46″E	
Dolmen de la Font de l'Aram I	three dolmens, one ruined and one destroyed		Ria-Sirach	42°37′15″N 2°21′51″E	
Dolmen de la Font de l'Orri	dolmen		Eus (hameau of Comes, Pyrénées-Orientales)	42°40′27″N 2°26′25″E	
Dolmen de Formentera	dolmen		Montbolo	42°29′41″N 2°37′51″E	
Dolmen de Galuert	dolmen		Llauro	42°32′11″N 2°44′30″E	
Dolmen de Gratallops	dolmen		Banyuls-sur-Mer	42°27′28″N 3°8′11″E	
Dolmen de la Guardiola	dolmen		Rodès	42°39′44″N 2°32′57″E	
Jassa Gran (dolmen de la)	composite dolmen (tumulus containing two dolmen chests)	location to be defined	Valcebollère	42°24′N 2°1′E	
Semi-dolmen de la Llosa del Cortal dels Polls	semi-dolmen		Arboussols	42°40′7″N 2°27′59″E	
Lloseta (dolmen)	dolmen		Clara-Villerach	42°36′13″N 2°27′17″E	
Dolmen du Mas Llussanes II	dolmen		Tarerach	42°40′19″N 2°30′46″E	
Dolmen du Mas Payrot	dolmen		Saint-Michel-de-Llotes	42°38′33″N 2°38′24″E	
Dolmen 2 de los Masos	dolmen		Saint-Michel-de-Llotes	42°38′33″N 2°38′16″E	
Molí (dolmen d'El)	dolmen		Eyne	in process of geolocalization	
Dolmen du Molí del Vent	dolmen		Bélesta	42°43′37″N 2°36′20″E	
Dolmen del Molló	dolmen		Mosset	42°40′53″N 2°20′51″E	
Dolmen de Montsec	two dolmens		Ria-Sirach	42°37′21″N 2°23′3″E	
Dolmen de la Mort de l'Éguassier	dolmen		Trévillach	in process of geolocalization	
Dolmen de l'Oliveda d'en David	dolmen		Salses-le-Château	42°52′17″N 2°56′47″E	
Dolmen de l'Oratori	dolmen		Saint-Marsal	42°31′38″N 2°35′56″E	
Pedra Dreta de l'Agly	menhir		Espira-de-l'Agly	42°49′8″N 2°47′57″E	
Pedra Dreta de Caladroer	broken menhir on the ground		Bélesta	42°43′40″N 2°39′26″E	
Pedra Dreta del Coll de la Dona Morta	menhir		Amélie-les-Bains-Palalda, Maçanet de Cabrenys	42°24′33″N 2°41′45″E	
Pedra Dreta de Sant Salvador	menhir		Cerbère	42°26′24″N 3°8′8″E	
Dolmen de Peyrelada	dolmen		Mosset	42°40′11″N 2°21′42″E	
Dolmen du Pla de l'Arca	dolmen		Castelnou	42°35′50″N 2°41′18″E	
Dolmen du Pla de l'Arca	dolmen		Molitg-les-Bains	42°40′23″N 2°24′2″E	
Dolmen du Pla d'Arques I	two dolmens, including one destroyed		Fuilla	42°32′31″N 2°20′25″E	
Semi-dolmen du Pla de les Egues	semi-dolmen		Boule-d'Amont	42°34′46″N 2°34′29″E	
Dolmens du Pla de Tarters	two dolmens, cupped rocks		Serdinya	42°33′31″N 2°19′50″E	
Pierre plantée du Planal de la Coma del Llop	likely menhir		Vingrau	42°50′18″N 2°49′10″E	
Dolmen de Lo Pou	dolmen		Eyne	42°28′52″N 2°4′46″E	
Dolmen de Prat Clos	dolmen		Ria-Sirach	42°37′37″N 2°22′49″E	
Dolmen du Puig del Fornas	dolmen	Approximate coordinates	Saint-Michel-de-Llotes	42°37′56″N 2°38′24″E	
Dolmen d'el Quadró	destroyed dolmen		Montesquieu-des-Albères	42°31′39″N 2°52′53″E	
Dolmen de la Ramera I	two dolmens		Caixas	42°36′22″N 2°40′5″E	
Dolmen de Ribes Rojes	dolmen		Taulis	42°30′43″N 2°37′11″E	
Dolmen du roc de l'Arca	dolmen		Feilluns	42°45′46″N 2°29′48″E	
Roc de l'Arquet	dolmen		Planèzes	42°45′25″N 2°37′44″E	
Dolmen du Roc de l'Home mort	dolmen		Ria-Sirach	42°37′50″N 2°21′44″E	
Dolmen du Roc de Jornac	dolmen		Urbanya	42°37′44″N 2°19′41″E	
Dolmen du Roc del Llamp	dolmen		Castelnou	42°36′44″N 2°41′38″E	
Roca d'Arques	dolmen		Oreilla	42°33′42″N 2°14′23″E	
Dolmen de la Rouyre	dolmen		Ansignan	42°45′43″N 2°30′26″E	
Dolmen de Les Saleres	dolmen		Les Cluses	42°29′46″N 2°50′28″E	
Dolmen de Sant Pere dels Forquets	dolmen		Argelès-sur-Mer	42°31′1″N 3°1′37″E	
Dolmen de Sant Ponci	dolmen		Molitg-les-Bains	42°39′33″N 2°24′7″E	
Dolmen de la Serra Mitjana	dolmen		Catllar, Eus	42°39′27″N 2°25′48″E	
Dolmen de la Serra de Santa Eulàlia I	dolmen		Fuilla	42°33′55″N 2°20′51″E	
Dolmen de la Serra de Santa Eulàlia II	dolmen		Fuilla	42°34′5″N 2°20′47″E	
Dolmen du Serrat Blanc	dolmen		Rodès	42°40′42″N 2°32′4″E	
Dolmen du Serrat de les Fonts I	dolmen		Saint-Marsal	42°32′17″N 2°36′38″E	
Dolmen du Serrat de les Fonts II	dolmen		Saint-Marsal	42°32′12″N 2°36′29″E	
Dolmen du Serrat d'en Jacques	dolmen		Caixas / Saint-Michel-de-Llotes	42°38′6″N 2°38′46″E	
Dolmen du Serrat d'en Jacques	semi-dolmen		Saint-Michel-de-Llotes	42°38′19″N 2°38′49″E	
Dolmen du Serrat d'en Parrot	dolmen		Corneilla-de-Conflent	42°34′52″N 2°23′16″E	
Dolmen du Sola dels Clots	dolmen		Castelnou	42°35′40″N 2°42′26″E	
Dolmen de la Siureda	dolmen		Maureillas-las-Illas	42°27′47″N 2°47′29″E	
Tumbo dels Espandiols	dolmen		Maury	42°48′14″N 2°33′9″E	
Dolmen de Valltorta	dolmen		Saint-Michel-de-Llotes	42°39′9″N 2°36′38″E	
La Peralada	Dolmen?		Salses-le-Château	in process of geolocalization	
Dolmen du Camp de l'Ariquet	Dolmenic chest?		Estagel	in process of geolocalization	
Pedra Llarga du Col de la Bataille	Cupule rock and possible dolmen	The coordinates given are those of a beautiful cup rock. The dolmen, if it exists, should be nearby.	Millas	in process of geolocalization	
Dolmen de Caladroer or du Correc de la Pedra Dreta	Dolmen	Documented dolmen, destroyed by agricultural work in the early 1970s.	Bélesta	in process of geolocalization	
Dolmen Arca de la Ginebrosa	Covered walkway?		Bélesta	in process of geolocalization	
Piló de la Llausa	Dolmen transformed into hut, in ruins		Montalba-le-Château	in process of geolocalization	
Dolmen du Serrat de Corda	Dolmen	Reported in 1961 by André Vigo, but inaccurately. Has not been found since.	Feilluns	in process of geolocalization	
Dolmen de Peyrolado	Dolmen	Reported in the 19th century. Possibly destroyed when the railroad was built.	Saint-Paul-de-Fenouillet	in process of geolocalization	
Dolmen de l'Arca	Dolmen	Cup stones have been found nearby.	Millas or Néfiach	in process of geolocalization	
Dolmen du lieu-dit Les Cassettes	Dolmen	Cross-engraved rock nearby.	Néfiach	in process of geolocalization	
Dolmen du Serrat de les Costes	Dolmen	Evidence of a stone with cupules.	Llauro	in process of geolocalization	
Dolmen des Arques del Coll de Maure	Dolmen	Attested by Pierre Ponsich in 1985.	Camélas	in process of geolocalization	
Dolmen de Cal Aussell de Dalt	Dolmen	Attested in the 1950s. Possibly since destroyed.	Caixas	in process of geolocalization	
Menhir de Perafita	Menhir or milestone?	Attested as early as 981.	Cerbère	42°27′21″N 3°9′33″E	
Dolmen du Coll de Seris	Dolmen	Reported by Ludovic Martinet in 1884. Not attested since.	Cerbère	in process of geolocalization	
Dolmen du Coll de Molló	Dolmen	Attested by several authors in the 19th century. Probably since destroyed.	Collioure	in process of geolocalization	
L'Arqueta	Dolmen		Collioure	in process of geolocalization	
Caixa del Moro du Montner de Prunet	Dolmen	Reported by Joseph Jaubert de Réart, since lost.	Prunet-et-Belpuig	in process of geolocalization	
La Peralada	Dolmen		Espira-de-Conflent	in process of geolocalization	
Dolmen de La Portella	Dolmen	Reported by Isidore Rouffandis in 1872, not found since.	Molitg-les-Bains?	in process of geolocalization	
La Bressa	Dolmen	Reported by Jaubert de Réart (1832) then Rouffandis (1872)	Molitg-les-Bains	in process of geolocalization	
Dolmen de Pineda	Dolmen	Reported by Jaubert de Réart (1832) then Rouffandis (1872)	Molitg-les-Bains	in process of geolocalization	
Dolmen de la Caixeta	Dolmen	It seems that the slabs of the old dolmen were reused for a shepherd's hut.	Ria-Sirach	in process of geolocalization	
Dolmen de Miralles	Dolmen	Seen by J. Abélanet in 1967, but not studied, difficult to access.	Conat	in process of geolocalization	
Dolmens de la Font d'Arques	One or several dolmens	Assumed by J. Abélanet on toponymic and situational considerations.	Limite Jujols/Évol	in process of geolocalization	
Arca de la Portella	Dolmen	Arca reported by several medieval sources.	Ayguatébia-Talau	in process of geolocalization	
Dolmen 1 de Roca Flavia	Dolmenic chamber	Reported by Édouard Maistre to Jean Abélanet in 1971. The latter was unable to find it.	Font-Romeu-Odeillo-Via, locality Roca Flavia	in process of geolocalization	
Dolmen 2 de Roca Flavia	Dolmenic chamber	Published in 1988 by Pierre Campmajo, but with location error. Location uncertain.	Font-Romeu-Odeillo-Via, locality Roca Flavia	in process of geolocalization	
Dolmen de la Forêt de Saillagouse	Dolmen		Saillagouse	in process of geolocalization	
Dolmen d'Err	Dolmen		Err	in process of geolocalization	
Dolmen de la forêt de Bolquère	Dolmen		Bolquère	in process of geolocalization	

=== Potential sites ===
Jean Abélanet has discovered multiple megalithic sites using toponymy, specifically the names of localities within the Napoleonic cadastre. Abélanet offers a list of potential sites containing megaliths, determined through name association.

- La Peyra Clausa in Bélesta;
- La Serra de la Martina, Saint-Arnac;
- Roc de la Martina locality in Fenouillet.

== See also ==
- fr:List of Alt Empordà megalithic sites

== Sources ==
=== Synthesis sources ===
- ^{(fr)} Jean Abélanet, Itinéraires mégalithiques dolmens et rites funéraires en Roussillon et Pyrénées nord-catalanes, Canet, Trabucaire, 2011, 350 p. (ISBN 978-2-84974-124-5)
- ^{(ca)} Enric Carreras Vigorós et Josep Tarrús Galter, "181 anys de recerca megalítica a la Catalunya Nord (1832-2012)", Annals de l'Institut d'Estudis Gironins, no 54, 2013, p. 31-184 (read online archive)
- ^{(ca)} Enric Carreras et Josep Tarrús, "Nous monuments megalítics a l'Alt Empordà i el Rosselló entre 1999-2015", Revista Cypsela, Gérone, no 20, (2014-2015), 2017, p. 25-61 (read online archive)

=== Other sources ===
- ^{(fr)} Les civilisations néolithiques du Midi de la France" Actes du colloque de Narbonne (15-17 février 1970), Carcassonne, coll. "Atacina"
  - In these proceedings, J. Abélanet publishes two articles "Une tombe néolithique l'Arca de Calahons" (p. 54-55) and "Les dolmens du Roussillon" (p. 74-79).
- ^{(fr)} André Vigo, "La toponymie de la vallée de l'Agly et des Fenouillèdes", C.E.R.C.A., vol. 12, 1961, p. 104-105.
- ^{(fr)} Pierre Ponsich, "Dolmens et roches gravés du Roussillon", Revista de Studi Liguri, Bordighera, vol. anno XV, nos 1–2, 1949, p. 53-61
- ^{(fr)} Bulletin archéologique publié par le Comité historique des arts et monumens, vol. 4, Paris, Comité historique des arts et monuments, 1847-1848 (ISSN 1256-3803, read online archive), p. 227
  - Letter from François Jaubert de Passa read to the committee by Prosper Mérimée.
- ^{(fr)} M. Pallary, "Les dolmens du Puig-Noulos. Pyréneés-Orientales", Bulletin de la Société d'anthropologie de Lyon, t. VI, 1887, p. 95-100
  - Also published in Matériaux pour l'Histoire Primitive et Naturelle de l'Homme, p. 439-443.
- ^{(fr)} Pierre Vidal, "Le Roussillon Préhistorique", Ruscino, nos 15–18, 1921
  - Reissued in a single volume in 1922.
- ^{(es)} J. Abélanet, M. Cura et J. Padró, "Sepulcros megalíticos de la Cerdanya y el Capcir", in Corpus de Sepulcros Megalíticos-8 (España), Barcelona, 1975.
- ^{(fr)} Jean-Baptiste Renard de Saint-Malo, "Études archéologiques sur Mirmande (village disparu près de Terrats)", Publicateur des Pyrénées Orientales, no 14, 1833
- ^{(fr)} Eugène Devaux, "Dolmens à gravures en Roussillon", Bulletin de la Société agricole, scientifique et littéraire des Pyrénées-Orientales, vol. 58, 1934, p. 225-239
