= Canton of Prades =

Coordinates: 42.6180°N 2.4227°E

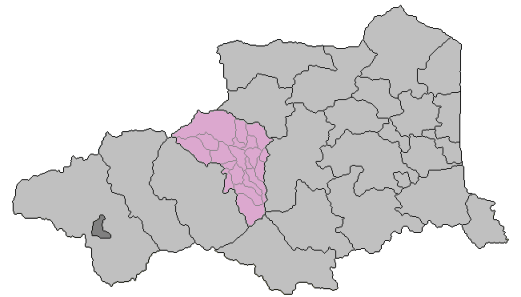
Location of the canton in Pyrénées-Orientales

The Canton of Prades is a French former canton of the Pyrénées-Orientales department, in the Languedoc-Roussillon region. As of 2012, it had 13,626 inhabitants. It was disbanded following the French canton reorganisation which came into effect in March 2015.

The canton comprised the following communes:

- Prades
- Campôme
- Casteil
- Catllar
- Clara-Villerach
- Codalet
- Conat
- Corneilla-de-Conflent
- Eus
- Fillols
- Fuilla
- Los Masos
- Molitg-les-Bains
- Mosset
- Nohèdes
- Ria-Sirach
- Taurinya
- Urbanya
- Vernet-les-Bains
- Villefranche-de-Conflent
