= Feilluns =

Feilluns Felhuns
- Commune
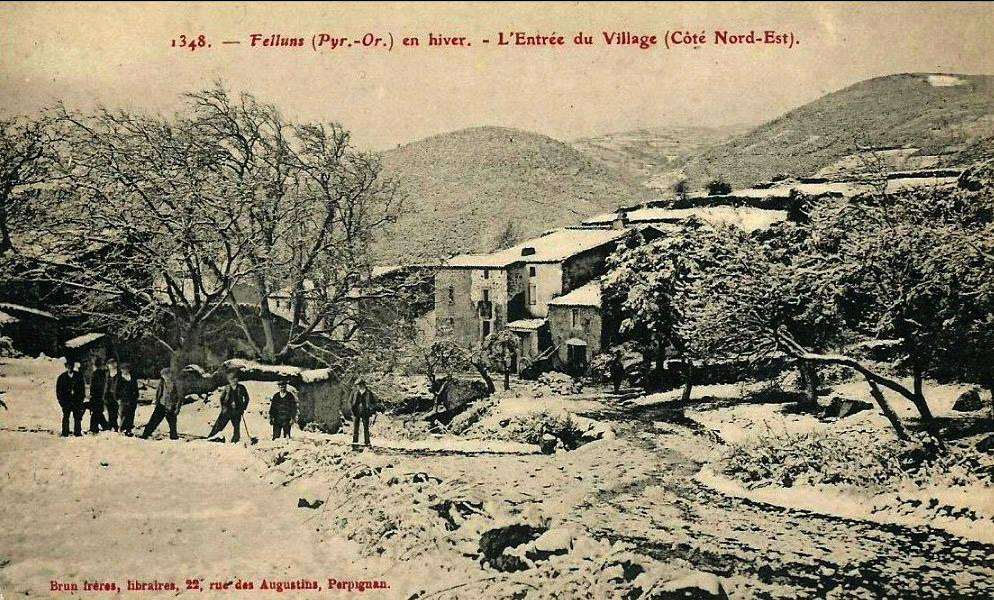
- An old postcard of Feilluns

- Coat of arms
- Location of Feilluns
- Location within France Location within Occitanie
- Coordinates: 42°45′45″N 2°29′04″E
- Country: France
- Region: Occitania
- Department: Pyrénées-Orientales
- Arrondissement: Prades
- Canton: La Vallée de l'Agly
- Intercommunality: Agly Fenouillèdes

Government
  - Mayor (2020–2026): Claude Fillol
- Area^{1}: 6.61 km^{2} (2.55 sq mi)
- Elevation: 375 m (1,230 ft)
- Highest elevation: 567 m (1,860 ft)
- Lowest elevation: 220 m (720 ft)
- Population (2023): 59
  - Density: 8.9/km^{2} (23/sq mi)
- Time zone: UTC+01:00 (CET)
  - Summer (DST): UTC+02:00 (CEST)
- INSEE/Postal code: 66076 /66730
- ^{1} French Land Register data, which excludes lakes, ponds, glaciers > 1 km^{2} (0.386 sq mi or 247 acres) and river estuaries.

Feilluns (before 2020: Felluns; Occitan: Felhuns) is a commune in the Pyrénées-Orientales department in southern France.

== Geography ==
Feilluns is located in the canton of La Vallée de l'Agly and in the arrondissement of Prades.

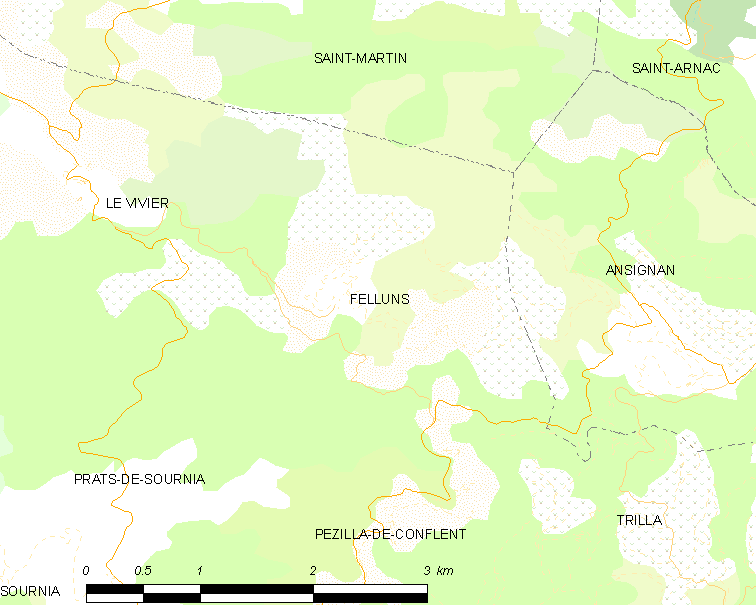
Map of Feilluns and its surrounding communes

== Population ==
Historical population
Year	Pop.	±% p.a.
1968	76	—
1975	57	−4.03%
1982	42	−4.27%
1990	48	+1.68%
1999	57	+1.93%
2007	59	+0.43%
2012	54	−1.76%
2017	70	+5.33%
2023	59	−2.81%
Source: INSEE

== See also ==
- Communes of the Pyrénées-Orientales department
