= Trilla, Pyrénées-Orientales =

Trilla
- Commune
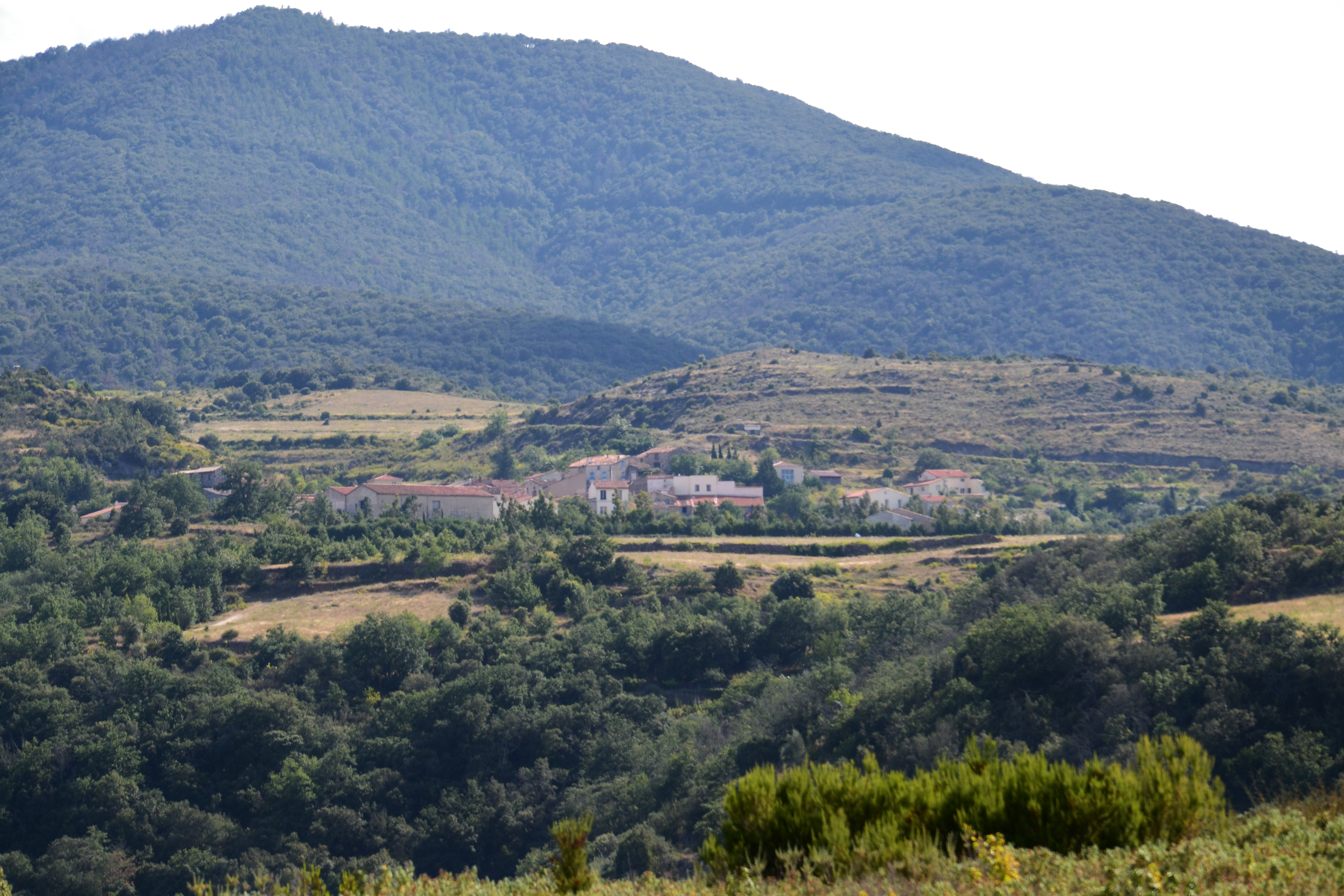
- A general view of Trilla

- Coat of arms
- Location of Trilla
- Location within France Location within Occitanie
- Coordinates: 42°44′26″N 2°31′12″E
- Country: France
- Region: Occitania
- Department: Pyrénées-Orientales
- Arrondissement: Prades
- Canton: La Vallée de l'Agly
- Intercommunality: Agly-Fenouillèdes

Government
  - Mayor (2020–2026): Didier Fourcade
- Area^{1}: 8.96 km^{2} (3.46 sq mi)
- Elevation: 400 m (1,300 ft)
- Highest elevation: 801 m (2,628 ft)
- Lowest elevation: 155 m (509 ft)
- Population (2023): 77
  - Density: 8.6/km^{2} (22/sq mi)
- Time zone: UTC+01:00 (CET)
  - Summer (DST): UTC+02:00 (CEST)
- INSEE/Postal code: 66216 /66220
- ^{1} French Land Register data, which excludes lakes, ponds, glaciers > 1 km^{2} (0.386 sq mi or 247 acres) and river estuaries.

Trilla (French pronunciation: [tʁija]; Occitan: Trilhan; Catalan: Trillà) is a commune in the Pyrénées-Orientales department in southern France.

Its inhabitants are called Trillanais, or Trilhanols in Occitan.

== Geography ==
Trilla is located in the canton of La Vallée de l'Agly and in the arrondissement of Prades.

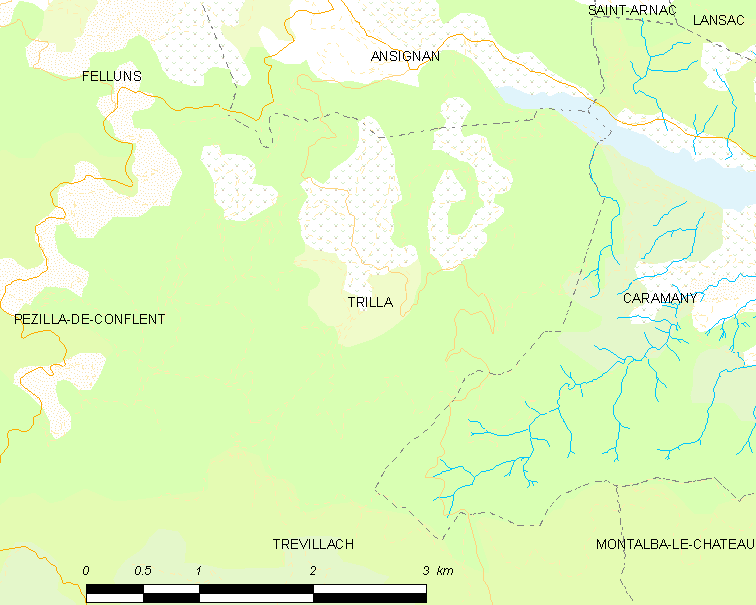
Map of Trilla and its surrounding communes

== Population ==
Historical population
Year	Pop.	±% p.a.
1968	72	—
1975	76	+0.78%
1982	64	−2.43%
1990	51	−2.80%
1999	54	+0.64%
2007	60	+1.33%
2012	62	+0.66%
2017	74	+3.60%
2023	77	+0.66%
Source: INSEE

== See also ==
- Communes of the Pyrénées-Orientales department
