= Caixas =

Caixas Caixàs / Queixàs
- Commune
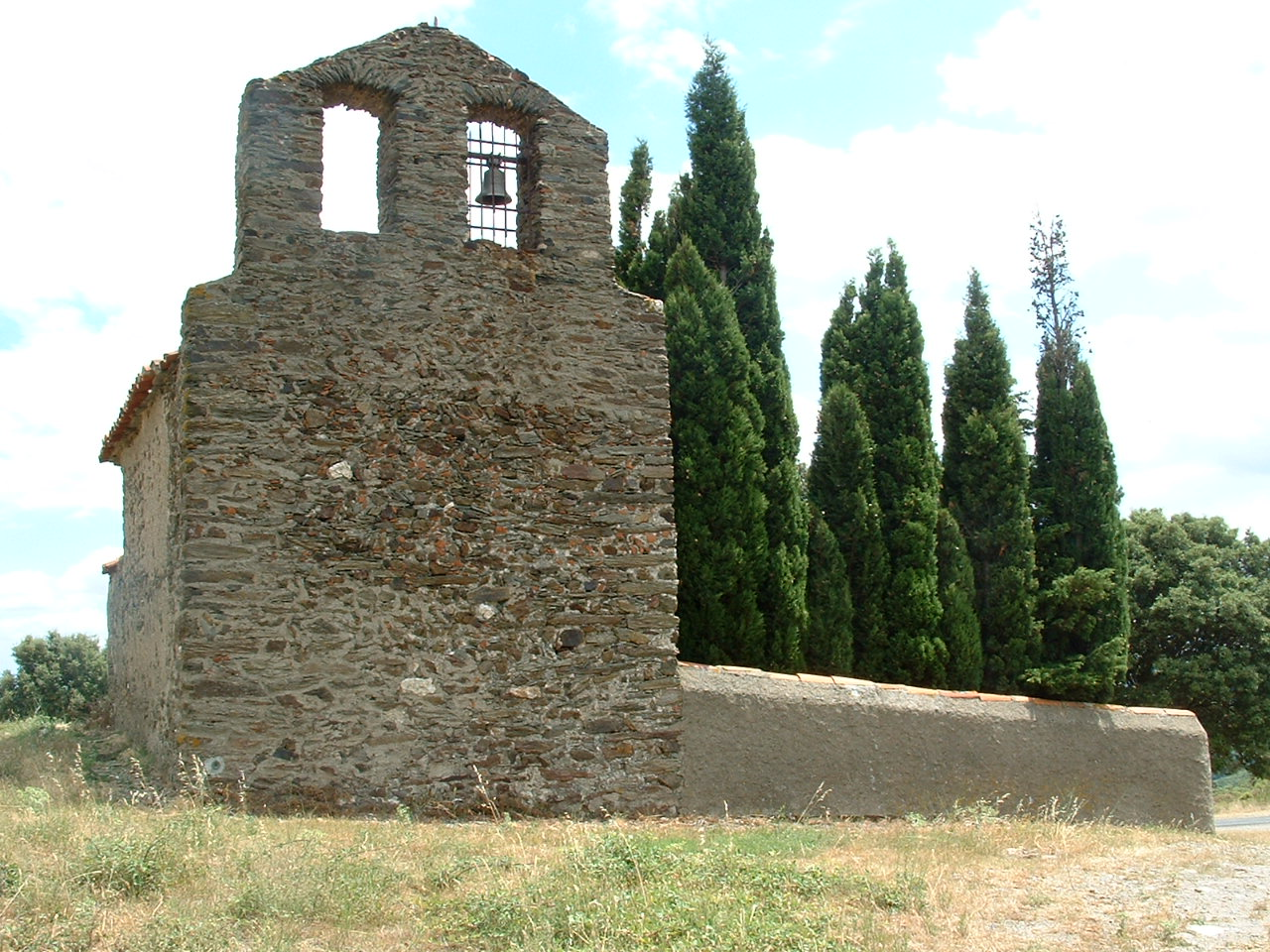
- The Chapel of Sainte-Marie de Fontcouverte, in the commune of Caixas
- Location of Caixas
- Location within France Location within Occitanie
- Coordinates: 42°35′02″N 2°41′02″E
- Country: France
- Region: Occitania
- Department: Pyrénées-Orientales
- Arrondissement: Céret
- Canton: Les Aspres
- Intercommunality: Aspres

Government
  - Mayor (2020–2026): Francis Ausseil
- Area^{1}: 28.11 km^{2} (10.85 sq mi)
- Elevation: 350 m (1,150 ft)
- Highest elevation: 774 m (2,539 ft)
- Lowest elevation: 199 m (653 ft)
- Population (2023): 134
  - Density: 4.77/km^{2} (12.3/sq mi)
- Time zone: UTC+01:00 (CET)
  - Summer (DST): UTC+02:00 (CEST)
- INSEE/Postal code: 66029 /66300
- ^{1} French Land Register data, which excludes lakes, ponds, glaciers > 1 km^{2} (0.386 sq mi or 247 acres) and river estuaries.

Caixas (French pronunciation: [kaʃas]; Catalan: Queixàs) is a commune in the Pyrénées-Orientales department in southern France.

== Geography ==
=== Localisation ===
Caixas is located in the canton of Les Aspres and in the arrondissement of Perpignan.

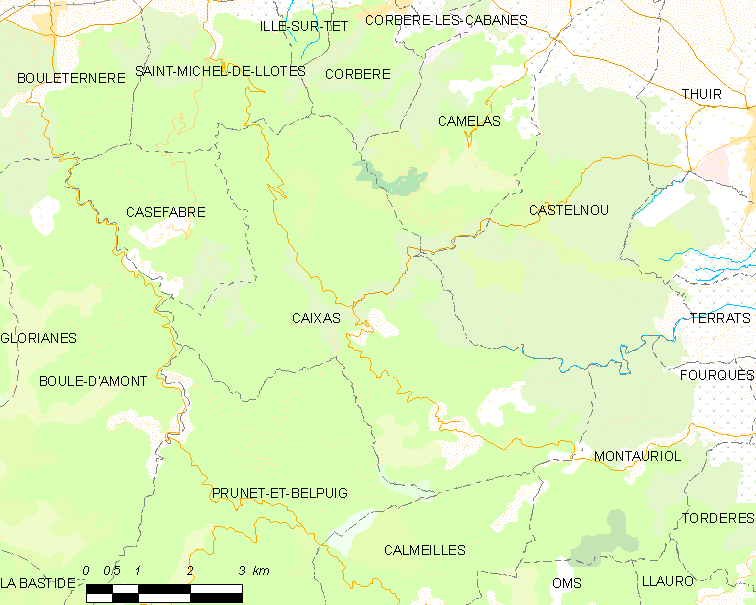
Map of Caixas and its surrounding communes

== Government and politics ==
=== Mayors ===
Mayor	Term start	Term end
Francis Ausseil	1995	2001
Alain Doutres	2001	2018
Francis Ausseil	2018	

== Population ==
Historical population
Year	Pop.	±% p.a.
1968	67	—
1975	58	−2.04%
1982	61	+0.72%
1990	84	+4.08%
1999	95	+1.38%
2007	112	+2.08%
2012	133	+3.50%
2017	142	+1.32%
2023	134	−0.96%
Source: INSEE

== See also ==
- Communes of the Pyrénées-Orientales department
- Caixas web site
