= Los Masos =

Los Masos Els Masos
- Commune
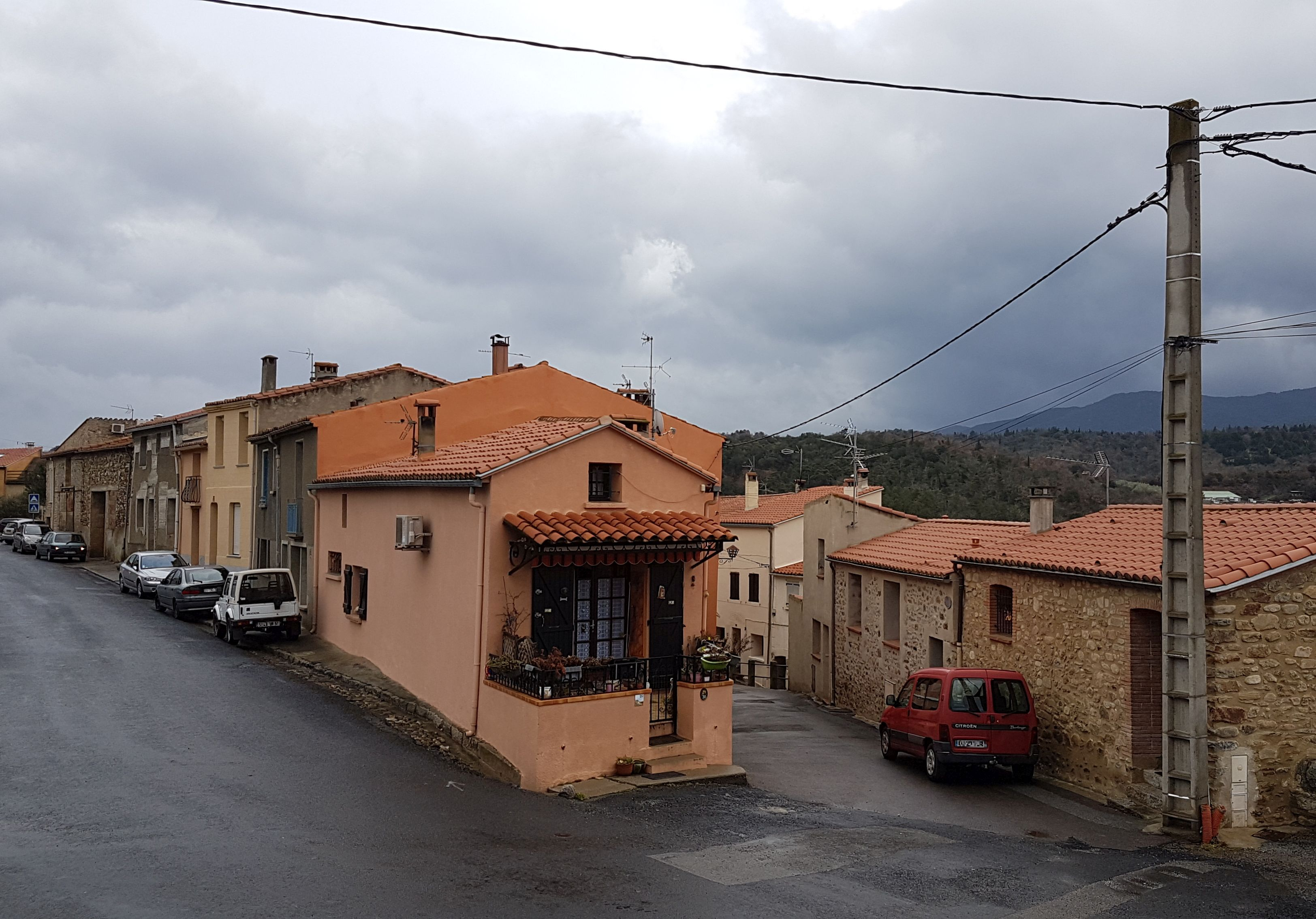
- Los Masos

- Coat of arms
- Location of Los Masos
- Location within France Location within Occitanie
- Coordinates: 42°37′22″N 2°27′46″E
- Country: France
- Region: Occitania
- Department: Pyrénées-Orientales
- Arrondissement: Prades
- Canton: Les Pyrénées catalanes

Government
  - Mayor (2020–2026): Guy Cassoly
- Area^{1}: 5.71 km^{2} (2.20 sq mi)
- Elevation: 350 m (1,150 ft)
- Highest elevation: 564 m (1,850 ft)
- Lowest elevation: 297 m (974 ft)
- Population (2023): 966
  - Density: 169/km^{2} (438/sq mi)
- Time zone: UTC+01:00 (CET)
  - Summer (DST): UTC+02:00 (CEST)
- INSEE/Postal code: 66104 /66500
- ^{1} French Land Register data, which excludes lakes, ponds, glaciers > 1 km^{2} (0.386 sq mi or 247 acres) and river estuaries.

Los Masos (Catalan: Els Masos, Los Masos) is a commune in the Pyrénées-Orientales department in southern France.

== Geography ==
Los Masos is located in the canton of Les Pyrénées catalanes and in the arrondissement of Prades. The town is also part of the historical region Conflent and is situated 4 km east of Prades.

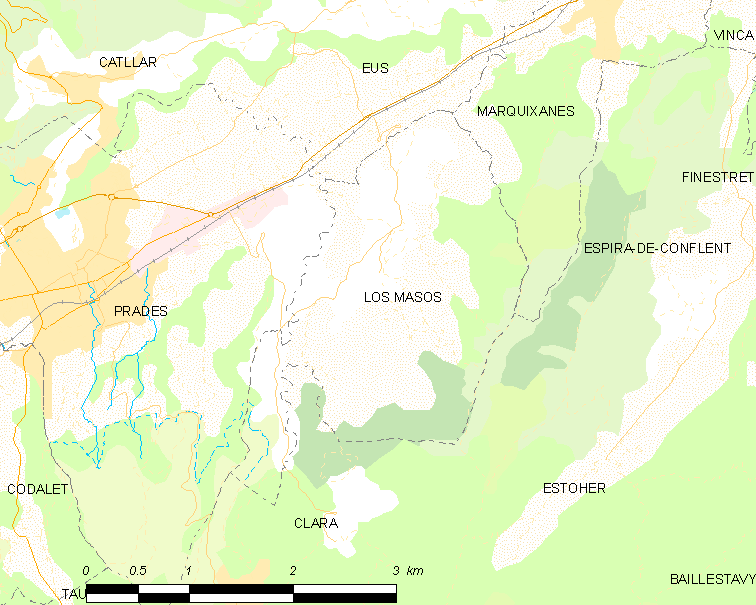
Map of Los Masos and its surrounding communes

== Population ==
Historical population
Year	Pop.	±% p.a.
1968	288	—
1975	299	+0.54%
1982	414	+4.76%
1990	515	+2.77%
1999	562	+0.98%
2007	661	+2.05%
2012	888	+6.08%
2017	966	+1.70%
2023	966	+0.00%
Source: INSEE

== See also ==
- Communes of the Pyrénées-Orientales department
