= Taulis =

Taulis Teulís
- Commune
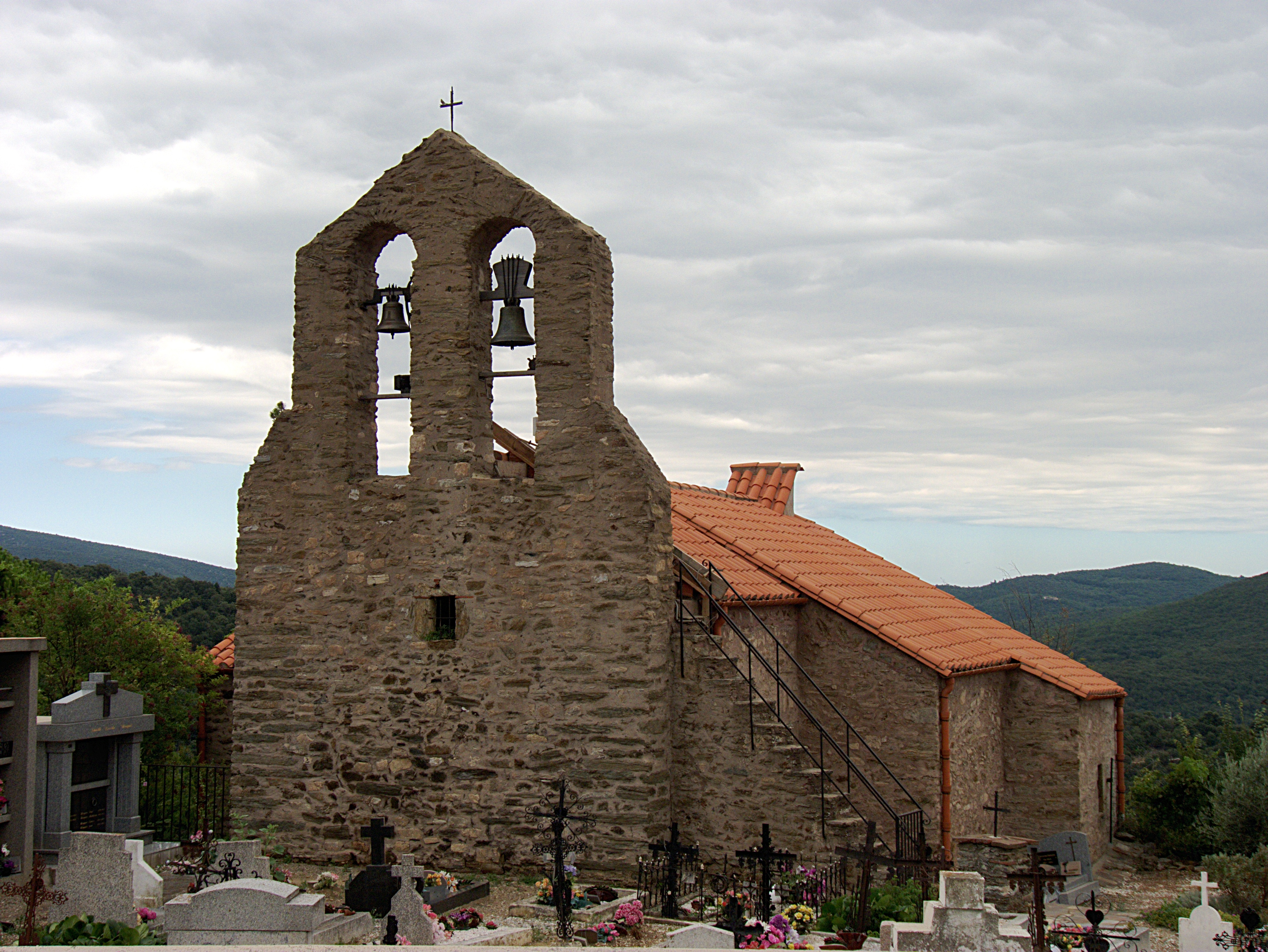
- The parish church of Saint-Jean L'Évangéliste, in Taulis
- Location of Taulis
- Location within France Location within Occitanie
- Coordinates: 42°31′29″N 2°38′00″E
- Country: France
- Region: Occitania
- Department: Pyrénées-Orientales
- Arrondissement: Céret
- Canton: Le Canigou
- Intercommunality: Haut Vallespir

Government
  - Mayor (2020–2026): Martine Mauguin
- Area^{1}: 6.19 km^{2} (2.39 sq mi)
- Elevation: 550 m (1,800 ft)
- Highest elevation: 1,360 m (4,460 ft)
- Lowest elevation: 340 m (1,120 ft)
- Population (2023): 58
  - Density: 9.4/km^{2} (24/sq mi)
- Time zone: UTC+01:00 (CET)
  - Summer (DST): UTC+02:00 (CEST)
- INSEE/Postal code: 66203 /66110
- ^{1} French Land Register data, which excludes lakes, ponds, glaciers > 1 km^{2} (0.386 sq mi or 247 acres) and river estuaries.

Taulis (French pronunciation: [tolis]; Catalan: Teulís) is a commune in the Pyrénées-Orientales department in southern France.

== Geography ==
Taulis is located in the canton of Le Canigou and in the arrondissement of Céret.

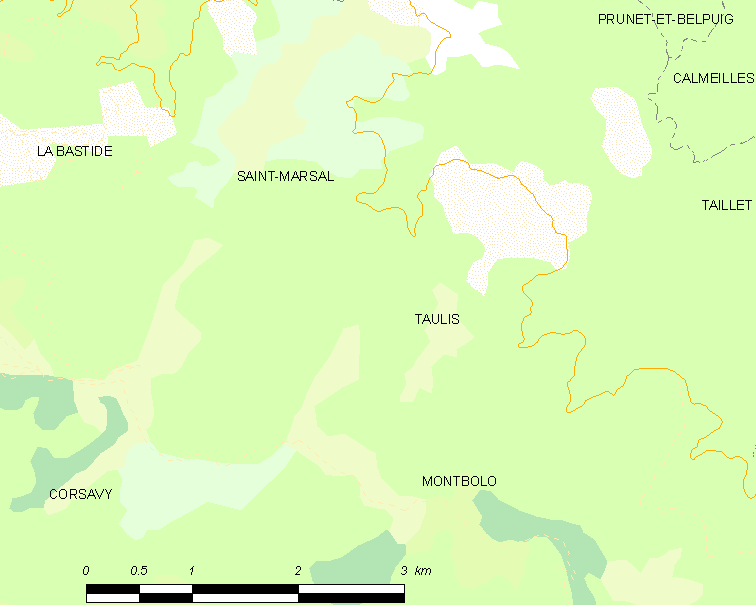
Map of Taulis and its surrounding communes

== Population ==
Historical population
Year	Pop.	±% p.a.
1968	51	—
1975	63	+3.06%
1982	64	+0.23%
1990	84	+3.46%
1999	45	−6.70%
2007	51	+1.58%
2012	50	−0.40%
2017	52	+0.79%
2023	58	+1.84%
Source: INSEE

== See also ==
- Communes of the Pyrénées-Orientales department
