= Tarerach =

Tarerach Tarerac
- Commune
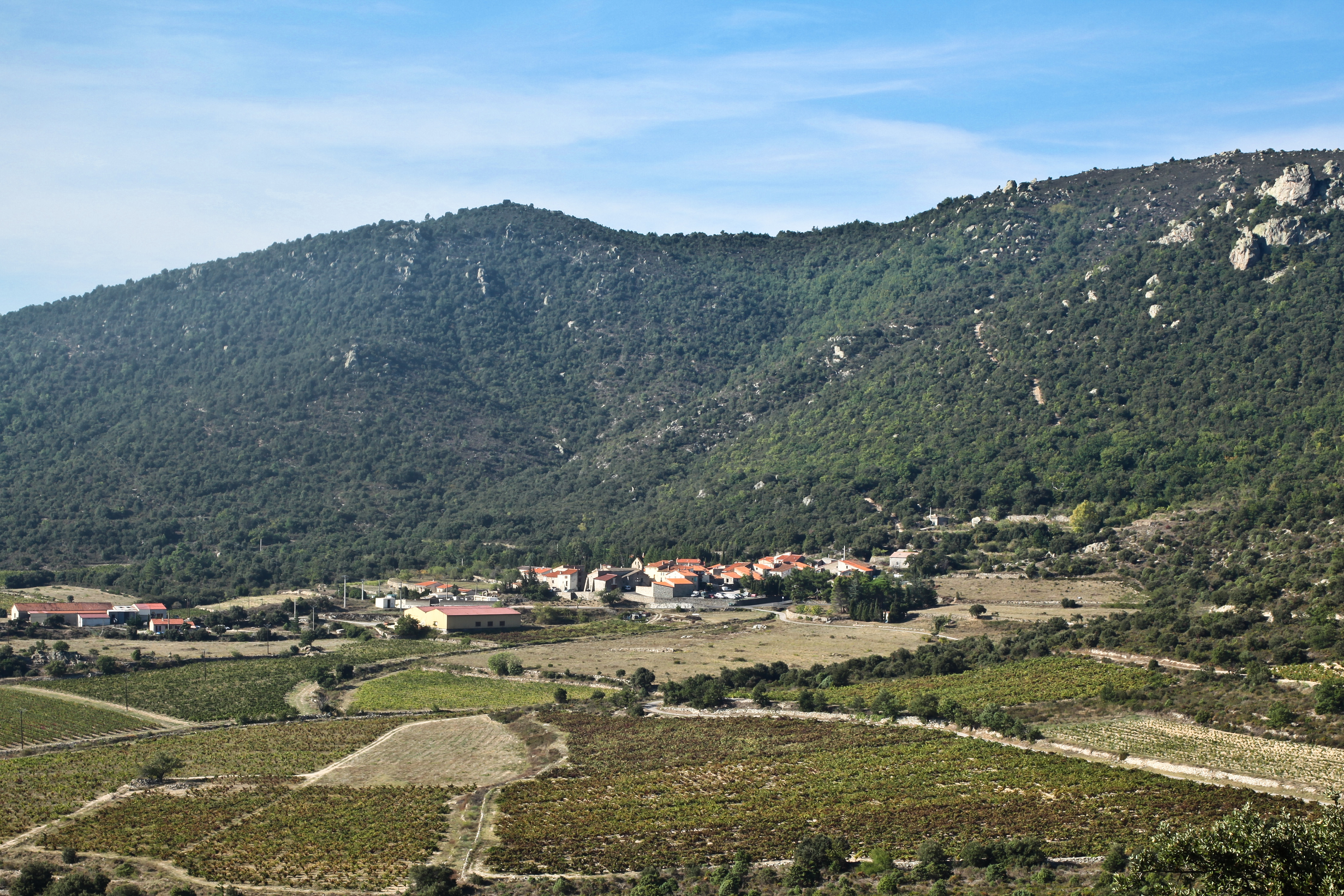
- A general view of Tarerach
- Location of Tarerach
- Location within France Location within Occitanie
- Coordinates: 42°41′29″N 2°30′06″E
- Country: France
- Region: Occitania
- Department: Pyrénées-Orientales
- Arrondissement: Prades
- Canton: La Vallée de l'Agly

Government
  - Mayor (2020–2026): Jean-Louis Salies
- Area^{1}: 8.16 km^{2} (3.15 sq mi)
- Elevation: 360 m (1,180 ft)
- Highest elevation: 863 m (2,831 ft)
- Lowest elevation: 354 m (1,161 ft)
- Population (2023): 42
  - Density: 5.1/km^{2} (13/sq mi)
- Time zone: UTC+01:00 (CET)
  - Summer (DST): UTC+02:00 (CEST)
- INSEE/Postal code: 66201 /66320
- ^{1} French Land Register data, which excludes lakes, ponds, glaciers > 1 km^{2} (0.386 sq mi or 247 acres) and river estuaries.

Tarerach (French pronunciation: [taʁeʁak]; also Tarérach; Catalan: Tarerac) is a commune in the Pyrénées-Orientales department in southern France.

== Geography ==
Tarerach is located in the canton of La Vallée de l'Agly and in the arrondissement of Prades.

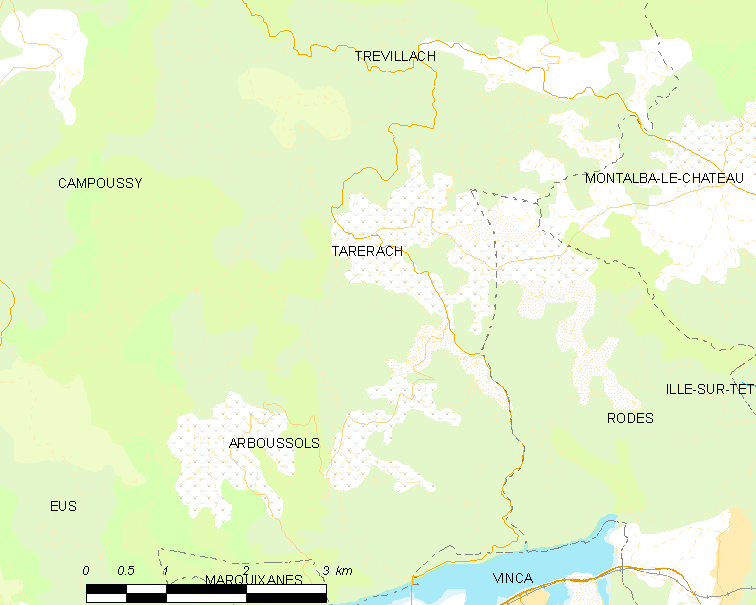
Map of Tarerach and its surrounding communes

== Population ==
Historical population
Year	Pop.	±% p.a.
1968	56	—
1975	72	+3.66%
1982	52	−4.54%
1990	48	−1.00%
1999	38	−2.56%
2007	57	+5.20%
2012	54	−1.08%
2017	46	−3.16%
2023	42	−1.50%
Source: INSEE

== See also ==
- Communes of the Pyrénées-Orientales department
