= Campoussy =

- Commune
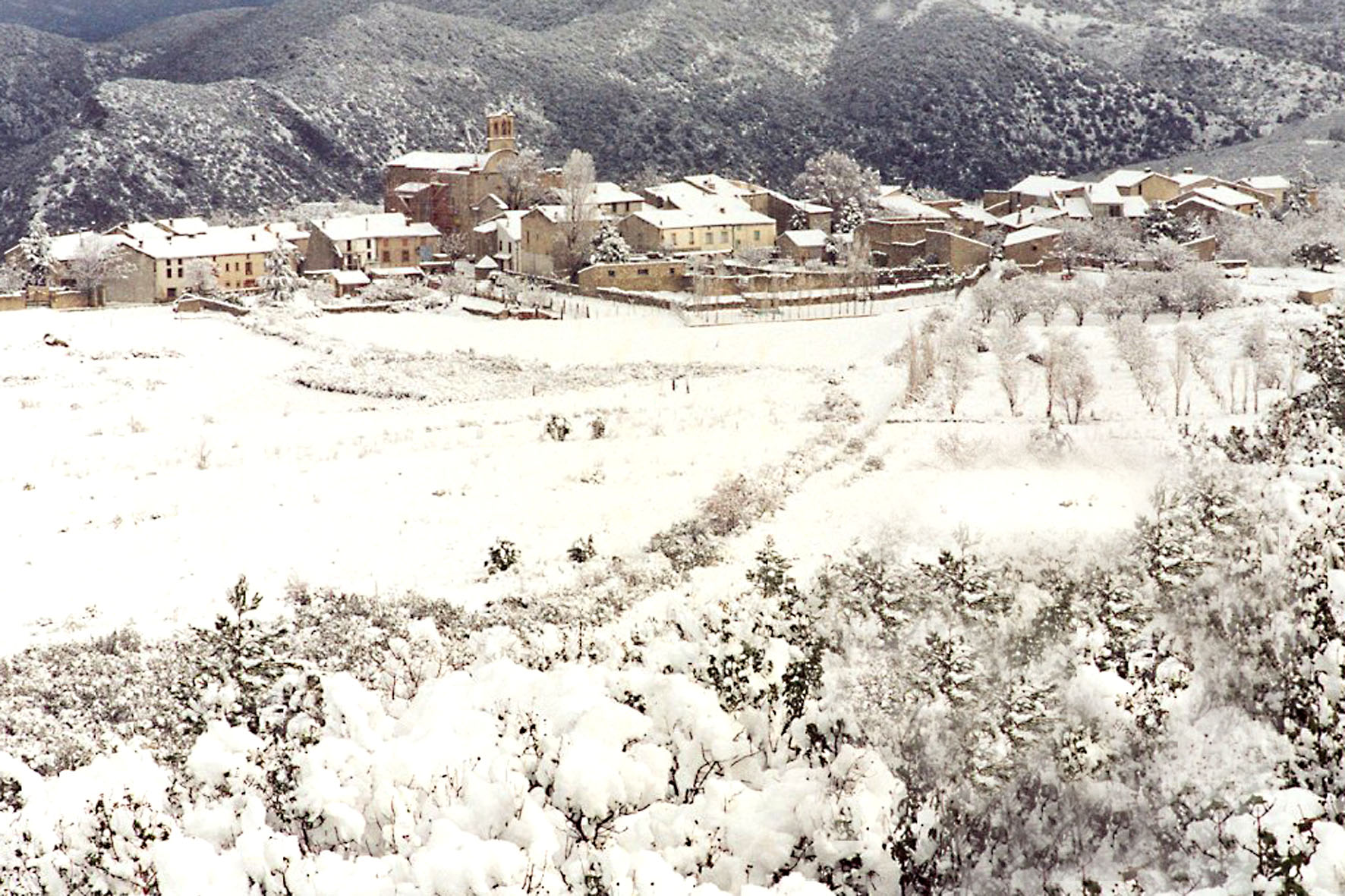
- Campoussy in the snow

- Coat of arms
- Location of Campoussy
- Location within France Location within Occitanie
- Coordinates: 42°42′40″N 2°27′33″E
- Country: France
- Region: Occitania
- Department: Pyrénées-Orientales
- Arrondissement: Prades
- Canton: La Vallée de l'Agly

Government
  - Mayor (2020–2026): Alain Boyer
- Area^{1}: 17.04 km^{2} (6.58 sq mi)
- Highest elevation: 1,144 m (3,753 ft)
- Lowest elevation: 391 m (1,283 ft)
- Population (2023): 42
  - Density: 2.5/km^{2} (6.4/sq mi)
- Time zone: UTC+01:00 (CET)
  - Summer (DST): UTC+02:00 (CEST)
- INSEE/Postal code: 66035 /66730
- ^{1} French Land Register data, which excludes lakes, ponds, glaciers > 1 km^{2} (0.386 sq mi or 247 acres) and river estuaries.

Campoussy (French pronunciation: [kɑ̃pusi]; Occitan: Camporsin) is a commune located in the Pyrénées-Orientales department, in southern France.

== Geography ==
=== Localisation ===
Campoussy is located in the canton of La Vallée de l'Agly and in the arrondissement of Prades.

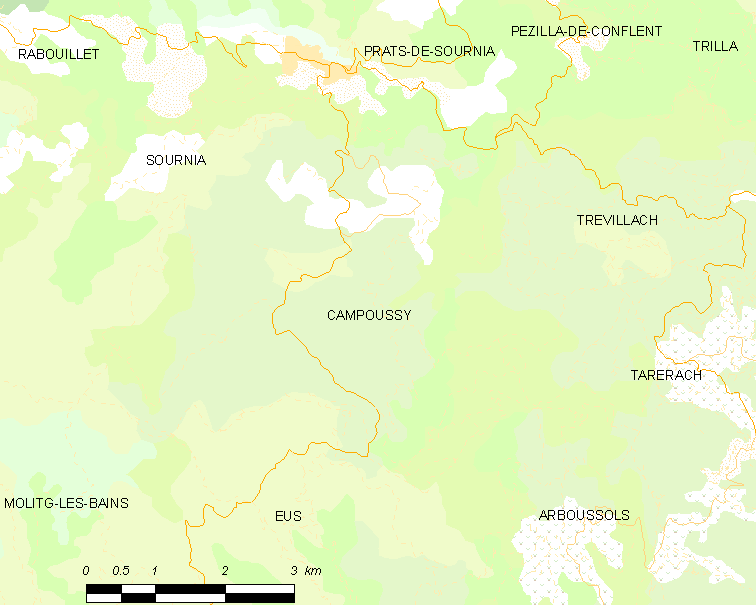
Map of Campoussy and its surrounding communes

== Population ==
Historical population
| Year | Pop. | ±% p.a. |
|---|---|---|
| 1968 | 14 | — |
| 1975 | 24 | +8.00% |
| 1982 | 33 | +4.65% |
| 1990 | 40 | +2.43% |
| 1999 | 35 | −1.47% |
| 2007 | 41 | +2.00% |
| 2012 | 46 | +2.33% |
| 2017 | 37 | −4.26% |
| 2023 | 42 | +2.14% |
Source: INSEE

== See also ==
- Communes of the Pyrénées-Orientales department
