= Saint-Michel-de-Llotes =

Saint-Michel-de-Llotes Sant Miquel de Llotes
- Commune
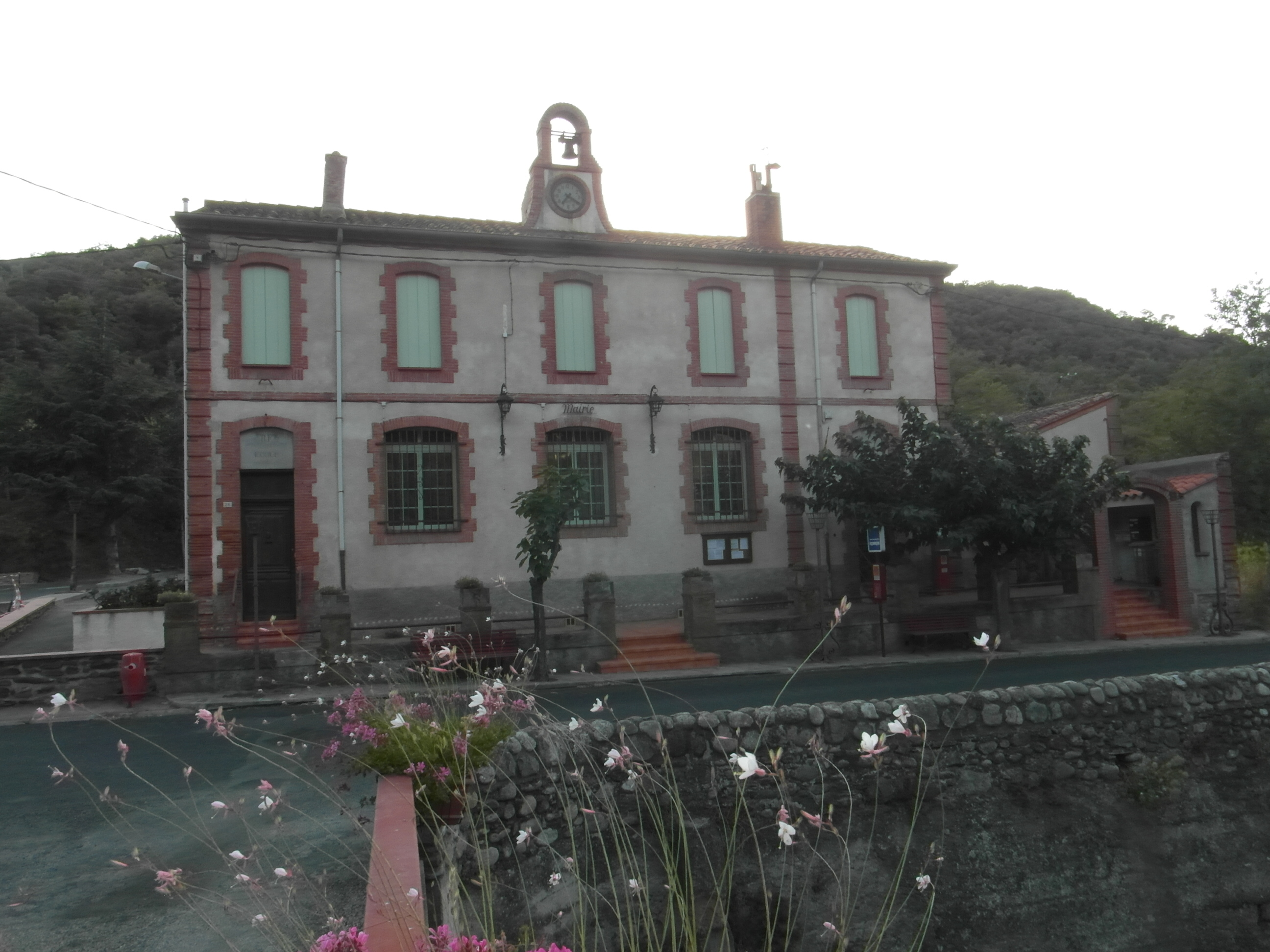
- The town hall in Saint-Michel-de-Llotes
- Location of Saint-Michel-de-Llotes
- Location within France Location within Occitanie
- Coordinates: 42°39′00″N 2°37′29″E
- Country: France
- Region: Occitania
- Department: Pyrénées-Orientales
- Arrondissement: Prades
- Canton: Le Canigou
- Intercommunality: Roussillon Conflent

Government
  - Mayor (2020–2026): Jean-Claude Solere
- Area^{1}: 8.64 km^{2} (3.34 sq mi)
- Elevation: 187 m (614 ft)
- Highest elevation: 602 m (1,975 ft)
- Lowest elevation: 146 m (479 ft)
- Population (2023): 364
  - Density: 42.1/km^{2} (109/sq mi)
- Time zone: UTC+01:00 (CET)
  - Summer (DST): UTC+02:00 (CEST)
- INSEE/Postal code: 66185 /66130
- ^{1} French Land Register data, which excludes lakes, ponds, glaciers > 1 km^{2} (0.386 sq mi or 247 acres) and river estuaries.

Saint-Michel-de-Llotes (French pronunciation: [sɛ̃ miʃɛl də jɔt]; Catalan: Sant Miquel de Llotes) is a commune in the Pyrénées-Orientales department in southern France.

== Geography ==
Saint-Michel-de-Llotes is located in the canton of Le Canigou and in the arrondissement of Prades.

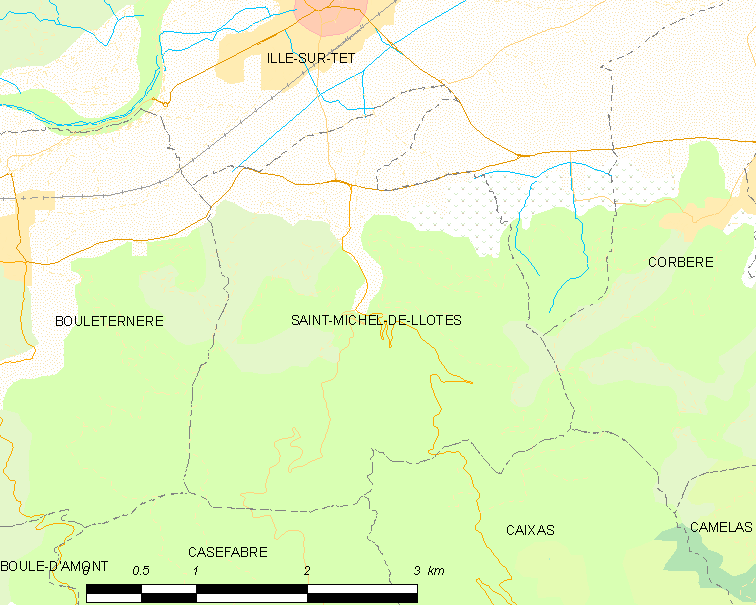
Map of Saint-Michel-de-Llotes and its surrounding communes

== Population ==
Historical population
Year	Pop.	±% p.a.
1968	237	—
1975	182	−3.70%
1982	205	+1.71%
1990	219	+0.83%
1999	269	+2.31%
2007	304	+1.54%
2012	332	+1.78%
2017	348	+0.95%
2023	364	+0.75%
Source: INSEE

== See also ==
- Communes of the Pyrénées-Orientales department
