= Espira-de-Conflent =

Espira-de-Conflent Espirà de Conflent (Catalan)
- Commune
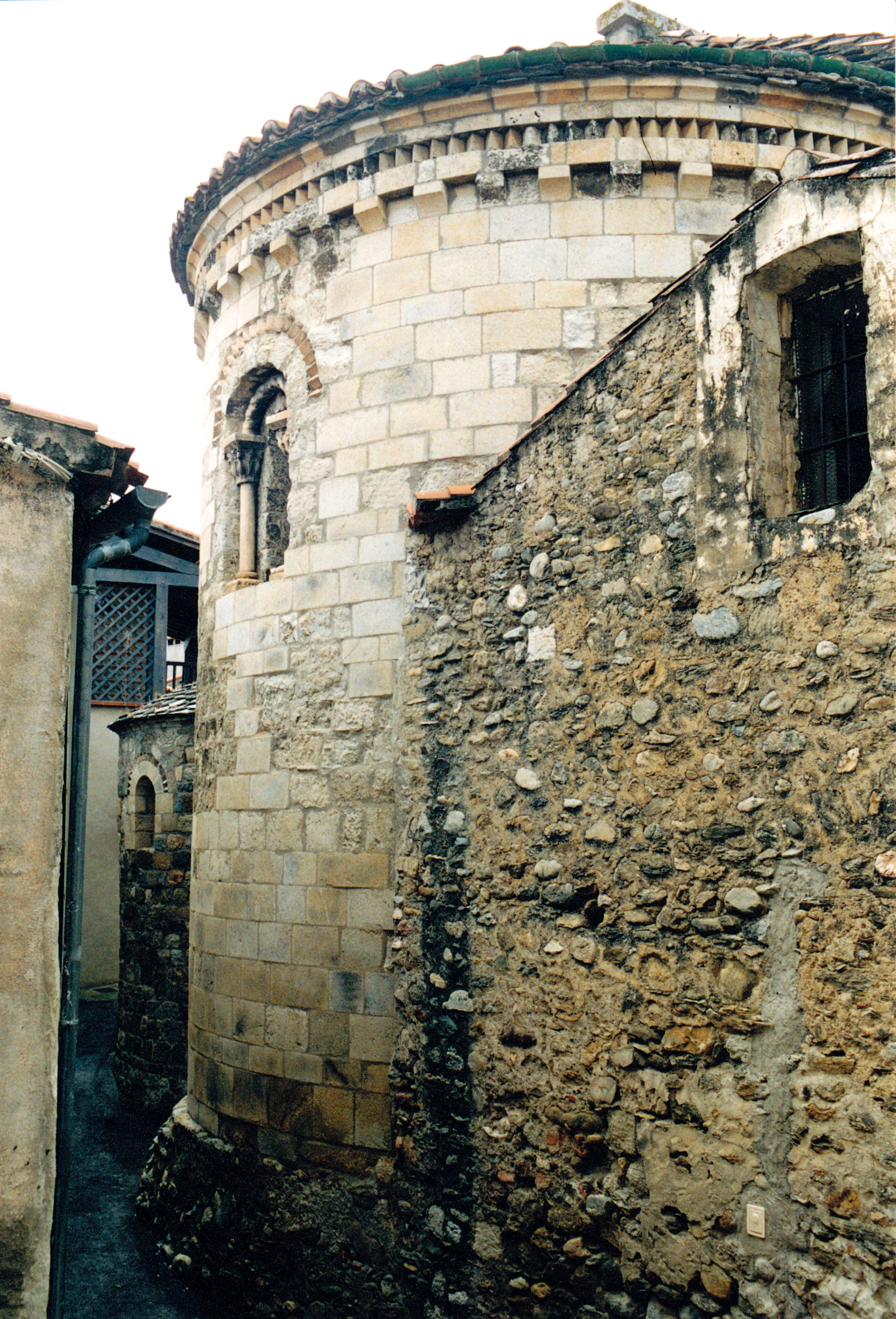
- The church of Sainte-Marie, in Espira-de-Conflent

- Coat of arms
- Location of Espira-de-Conflent
- Location within France Location within Occitanie
- Coordinates: 42°37′05″N 2°29′56″E
- Country: France
- Region: Occitania
- Department: Pyrénées-Orientales
- Arrondissement: Prades
- Canton: Le Canigou
- Intercommunality: Conflent Canigó

Government
  - Mayor (2020–2026): Roger Paillès
- Area^{1}: 6.03 km^{2} (2.33 sq mi)
- Elevation: 330 m (1,080 ft)
- Highest elevation: 767 m (2,516 ft)
- Lowest elevation: 260 m (850 ft)
- Population (2023): 227
  - Density: 37.6/km^{2} (97.5/sq mi)
- Time zone: UTC+01:00 (CET)
  - Summer (DST): UTC+02:00 (CEST)
- INSEE/Postal code: 66070 /66320
- ^{1} French Land Register data, which excludes lakes, ponds, glaciers > 1 km^{2} (0.386 sq mi or 247 acres) and river estuaries.

Espira-de-Conflent (French pronunciation: [ɛspiʁa də kɔ̃flɑ̃], literally Espira of Conflent; Catalan: Espirà de Conflent) is a commune in the Pyrénées-Orientales department in southern France.

== Geography ==
=== Localisation ===
Espira-de-Conflent is located in the canton of Le Canigou and in the arrondissement of Prades.

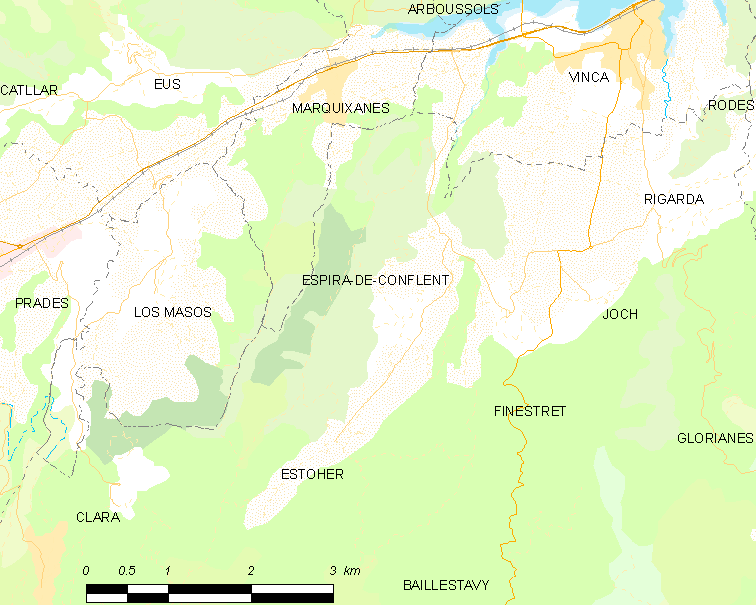
Map of Espira-de-Conflent and its surrounding communes

== Population ==
Historical population
Year	Pop.	±% p.a.
1968	162	—
1975	121	−4.08%
1982	124	+0.35%
1990	132	+0.78%
1999	125	−0.60%
2007	178	+4.52%
2012	169	−1.03%
2017	168	−0.12%
2023	227	+5.14%
Source: INSEE

The inhabitants of the commune are known as Espiranois(es) in French.

== See also ==
- Communes of the Pyrénées-Orientales department
