= Saint-Marsal =

Saint-Marsal Sant Marçal
- Commune
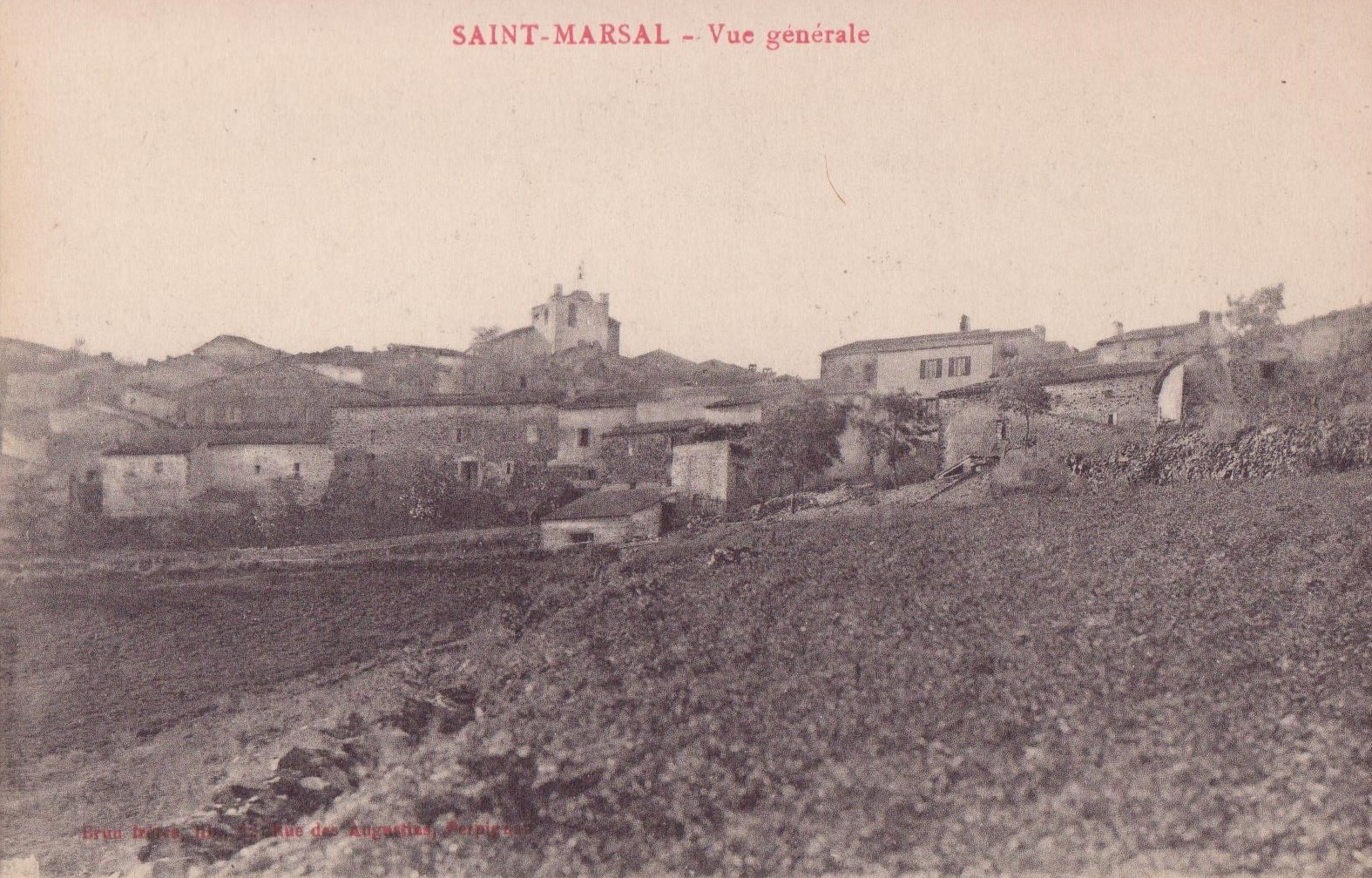
- A postcard view of Saint-Marsal, in the early 20th century

- Coat of arms
- Location of Saint-Marsal
- Location within France Location within Occitanie
- Coordinates: 42°32′19″N 2°37′19″E
- Country: France
- Region: Occitania
- Department: Pyrénées-Orientales
- Arrondissement: Céret
- Canton: Le Canigou
- Intercommunality: Haut Vallespir

Government
  - Mayor (2021–2026): Guy Metivier
- Area^{1}: 15.36 km^{2} (5.93 sq mi)
- Elevation: 720 m (2,360 ft)
- Highest elevation: 1,477 m (4,846 ft)
- Lowest elevation: 260 m (850 ft)
- Population (2023): 77
  - Density: 5.0/km^{2} (13/sq mi)
- Time zone: UTC+01:00 (CET)
  - Summer (DST): UTC+02:00 (CEST)
- INSEE/Postal code: 66183 /66110
- ^{1} French Land Register data, which excludes lakes, ponds, glaciers > 1 km^{2} (0.386 sq mi or 247 acres) and river estuaries.

Saint-Marsal (French pronunciation: [sɛ̃ maʁsal]; Catalan: Sant Marçal) is a commune in the Pyrénées-Orientales department in southern France.

== Geography ==
Saint-Marsal is located in the canton of Le Canigou and in the arrondissement of Céret.

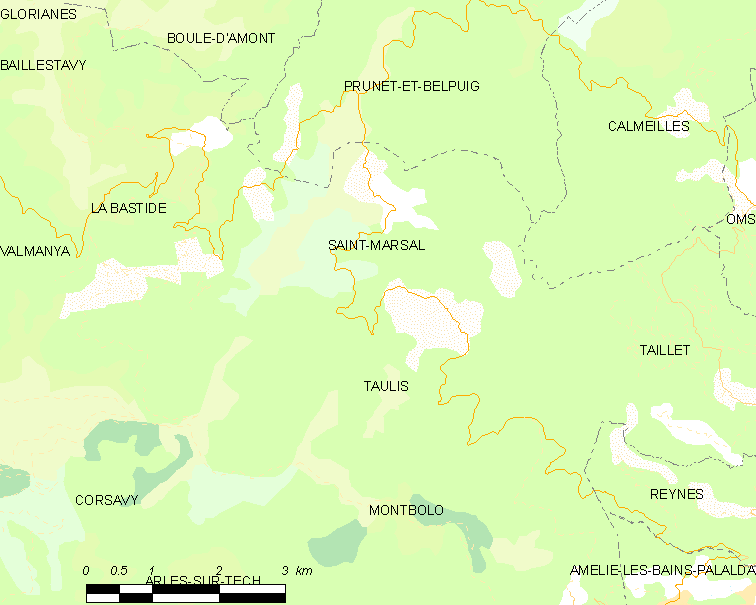
Map of Saint-Marsal and its surrounding communes

== Population ==
Historical population
Year	Pop.	±% p.a.
1968	117	—
1975	108	−1.14%
1982	104	−0.54%
1990	77	−3.69%
1999	85	+1.10%
2007	103	+2.43%
2012	91	−2.45%
2017	71	−4.84%
2023	77	+1.36%
Source: INSEE

== See also ==
- Communes of the Pyrénées-Orientales department
