= Molitg-les-Bains =

Molitg-les-Bains Molig
- Commune
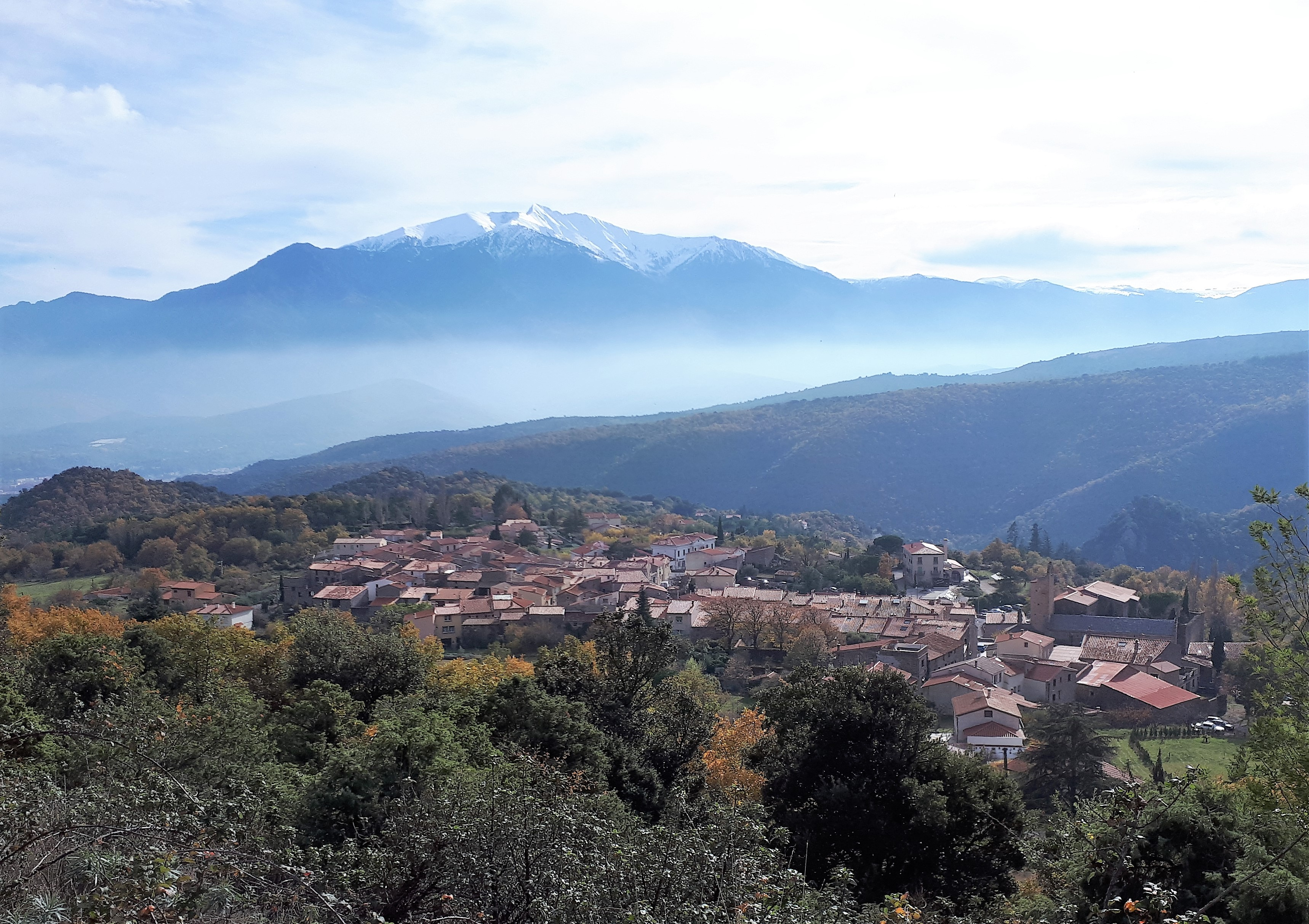
- View of Molitg-les-Bains with the Canigó in the background

- Coat of arms
- Location of Molitg-les-Bains
- Location within France Location within Occitanie
- Coordinates: 42°39′12″N 2°23′21″E
- Country: France
- Region: Occitania
- Department: Pyrénées-Orientales
- Arrondissement: Prades
- Canton: Les Pyrénées catalanes

Government
  - Mayor (2020–2026): Gérard Ques
- Area^{1}: 12.96 km^{2} (5.00 sq mi)
- Elevation: 610 m (2,000 ft)
- Highest elevation: 1,237 m (4,058 ft)
- Lowest elevation: 353 m (1,158 ft)
- Population (2023): 251
  - Density: 19.4/km^{2} (50.2/sq mi)
- Time zone: UTC+01:00 (CET)
  - Summer (DST): UTC+02:00 (CEST)
- INSEE/Postal code: 66109 /66500
- ^{1} French Land Register data, which excludes lakes, ponds, glaciers > 1 km^{2} (0.386 sq mi or 247 acres) and river estuaries.

Molitg-les-Bains (Catalan: Molig) is a commune in the Pyrénées-Orientales department in southern France.

== Geography ==
Molitg-les-Bains is located in the canton of Les Pyrénées catalanes and in the arrondissement of Prades.

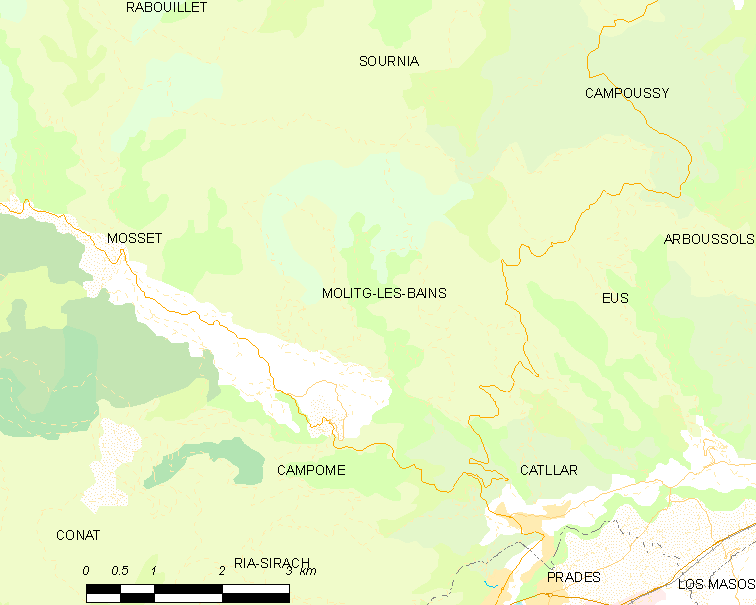
Map of Molitg-les-Bains and its surrounding communes

== Population ==
Historical population
| Year | Pop. | ±% p.a. |
|---|---|---|
| 1968 | 229 | — |
| 1975 | 164 | −4.66% |
| 1982 | 180 | +1.34% |
| 1990 | 185 | +0.34% |
| 1999 | 207 | +1.26% |
| 2007 | 217 | +0.59% |
| 2012 | 212 | −0.47% |
| 2017 | 233 | +1.91% |
| 2023 | 251 | +1.25% |
Source: INSEE

== See also ==
- Communes of the Pyrénées-Orientales department
