= Eus =

- Commune
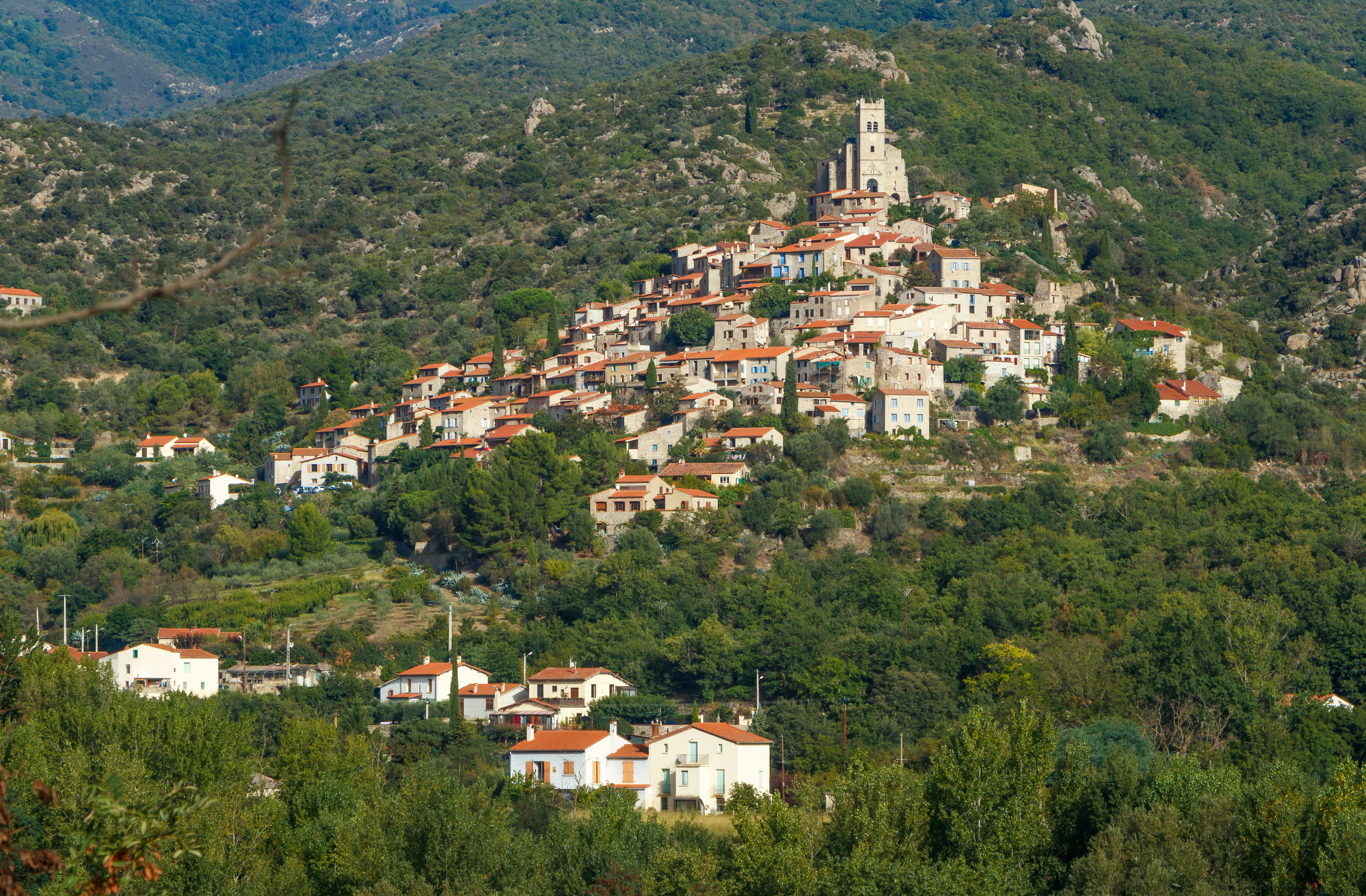
- A general view of Eus

- Coat of arms
- Location of Eus
- Location within France Location within Occitanie
- Coordinates: 42°38′40″N 2°27′29″E
- Country: France
- Region: Occitania
- Department: Pyrénées-Orientales
- Arrondissement: Prades
- Canton: Les Pyrénées catalanes
- Intercommunality: CC Conflent Canigó

Government
  - Mayor (2020–2026): Joseph Montessino
- Area^{1}: 20.08 km^{2} (7.75 sq mi)
- Elevation: 349 m (1,145 ft)
- Highest elevation: 1,143 m (3,750 ft)
- Lowest elevation: 244 m (801 ft)
- Population (2023): 386
  - Density: 19.2/km^{2} (49.8/sq mi)
- Demonym: Iliciens
- Time zone: UTC+01:00 (CET)
  - Summer (DST): UTC+02:00 (CEST)
- INSEE/Postal code: 66074 /66500
- ^{1} French Land Register data, which excludes lakes, ponds, glaciers > 1 km^{2} (0.386 sq mi or 247 acres) and river estuaries.

Eus ([ɛws] in both French and Catalan) is a commune in the Pyrénées-Orientales department in the Occitania region in Southern France. It is located just northeast of Prades. It is a member of Les Plus Beaux Villages de France (The Most Beautiful Villages of France) Association.

== Geography ==
=== Localization ===
Eus is located in the canton of Les Pyrénées catalanes and in the arrondissement of Prades.

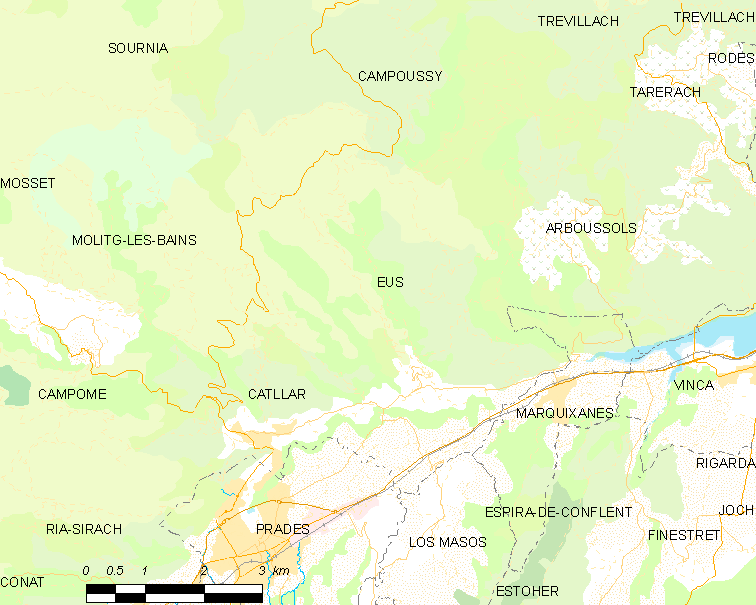
Map of Eus and its surrounding communes

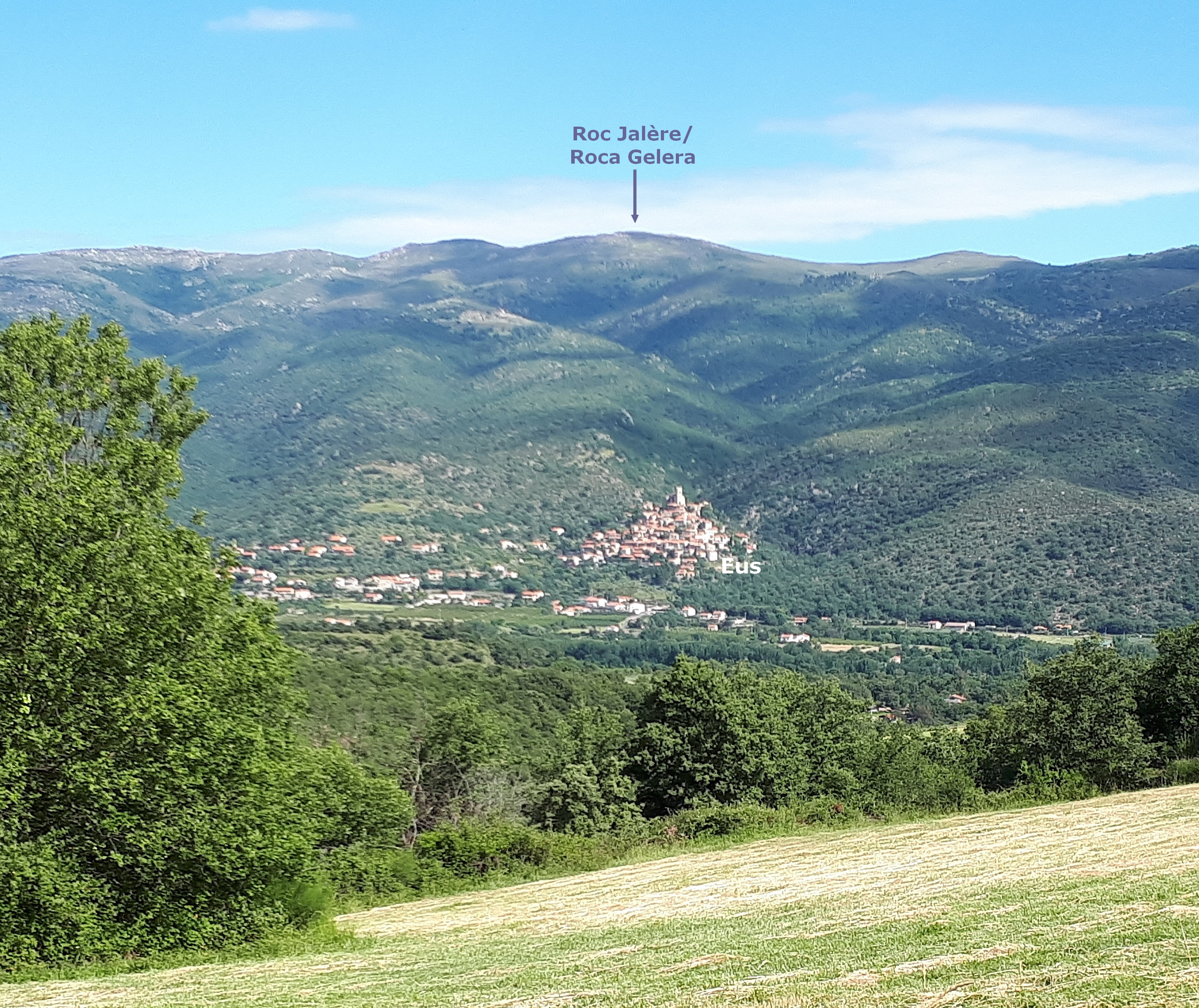
Roc Jalère (altitude 1110 metres) and Eus village. The greater part of the commune is visible in this image.

== Climate ==
On average, Eus experiences 56.1 days per year with a minimum temperature below 0 °C (32.0 °F), 0.2 days per year with a minimum temperature below −10 °C (14.0 °F), 0.1 days per year with a maximum temperature below 0 °C (32.0 °F), and 30.5 days per year with a maximum temperature above 30 °C (86.0 °F). The record high temperature was 42.0 °C (107.6 °F) on 28 June 2019, while the record low temperature was −10.9 °C (12.4 °F) on 15 February 2010.

Climate data for Eus (1991–2020 normals, extremes 1994–present)
| Month | Jan | Feb | Mar | Apr | May | Jun | Jul | Aug | Sep | Oct | Nov | Dec | Year |
|---|---|---|---|---|---|---|---|---|---|---|---|---|---|
| Record high °C (°F) | 26.3 (79.3) | 27.7 (81.9) | 28.3 (82.9) | 31.7 (89.1) | 33.7 (92.7) | 42.0 (107.6) | 38.4 (101.1) | 37.7 (99.9) | 35.2 (95.4) | 32.6 (90.7) | 27.1 (80.8) | 24.5 (76.1) | 42.0 (107.6) |
| Mean daily maximum °C (°F) | 12.7 (54.9) | 13.7 (56.7) | 16.4 (61.5) | 18.8 (65.8) | 22.0 (71.6) | 26.4 (79.5) | 28.9 (84.0) | 28.6 (83.5) | 25.1 (77.2) | 21.2 (70.2) | 16.1 (61.0) | 13.2 (55.8) | 20.3 (68.5) |
| Daily mean °C (°F) | 6.7 (44.1) | 7.4 (45.3) | 9.9 (49.8) | 12.3 (54.1) | 15.5 (59.9) | 19.4 (66.9) | 21.6 (70.9) | 21.3 (70.3) | 17.9 (64.2) | 14.5 (58.1) | 9.8 (49.6) | 7.0 (44.6) | 13.6 (56.5) |
| Mean daily minimum °C (°F) | 0.7 (33.3) | 1.1 (34.0) | 3.3 (37.9) | 5.7 (42.3) | 9.0 (48.2) | 12.4 (54.3) | 14.3 (57.7) | 14.1 (57.4) | 10.7 (51.3) | 7.8 (46.0) | 3.4 (38.1) | 0.8 (33.4) | 6.9 (44.5) |
| Record low °C (°F) | −9.8 (14.4) | −10.9 (12.4) | −9.6 (14.7) | −3.7 (25.3) | −0.7 (30.7) | 3.2 (37.8) | 6.1 (43.0) | 4.0 (39.2) | 0.8 (33.4) | −3.0 (26.6) | −10.3 (13.5) | −10.1 (13.8) | −10.9 (12.4) |
| Average precipitation mm (inches) | 54.8 (2.16) | 33.3 (1.31) | 46.2 (1.82) | 56.5 (2.22) | 50.7 (2.00) | 34.0 (1.34) | 29.8 (1.17) | 34.2 (1.35) | 41.1 (1.62) | 45.6 (1.80) | 65.5 (2.58) | 48.1 (1.89) | 539.8 (21.26) |
| Average precipitation days (≥ 1.0 mm) | 5.5 | 3.8 | 5.2 | 7.2 | 7.5 | 5.5 | 4.2 | 5.3 | 5.6 | 5.1 | 5.5 | 4.2 | 64.6 |
Source: Meteociel

== Population ==
Historical population
| Year | Pop. | ±% p.a. |
|---|---|---|
| 1968 | 370 | — |
| 1975 | 330 | −1.62% |
| 1982 | 355 | +1.05% |
| 1990 | 361 | +0.21% |
| 1999 | 375 | +0.42% |
| 2007 | 400 | +0.81% |
| 2012 | 403 | +0.15% |
| 2017 | 388 | −0.76% |
| 2023 | 386 | −0.09% |
Source: INSEE

== See also ==
- Communes of the Pyrénées-Orientales department
