= Ria-Sirach =

Ria-Sirach Rià i Cirac
- Commune
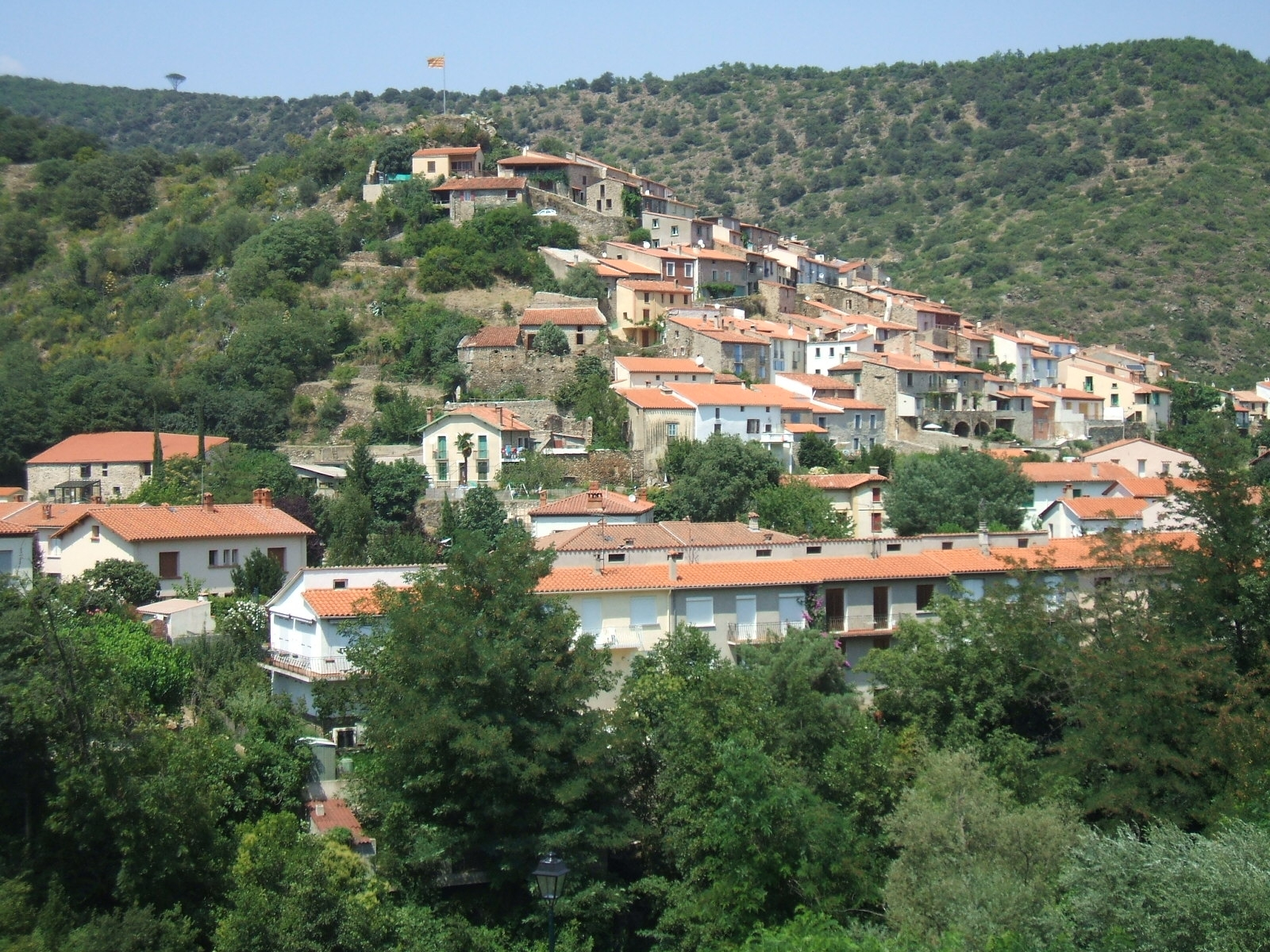
- A general view of Ria-Sirach

- Coat of arms
- Location of Ria-Sirach
- Location within France Location within Occitanie
- Coordinates: 42°36′34″N 2°24′02″E
- Country: France
- Region: Occitania
- Department: Pyrénées-Orientales
- Arrondissement: Prades
- Canton: Les Pyrénées catalanes

Government
  - Mayor (2020–2026): Jean Maury
- Area^{1}: 12.82 km^{2} (4.95 sq mi)
- Elevation: 400 m (1,300 ft)
- Highest elevation: 1,081 m (3,547 ft)
- Lowest elevation: 339 m (1,112 ft)
- Population (2023): 1,264
  - Density: 98.60/km^{2} (255.4/sq mi)
- Time zone: UTC+01:00 (CET)
  - Summer (DST): UTC+02:00 (CEST)
- INSEE/Postal code: 66161 /66500
- ^{1} French Land Register data, which excludes lakes, ponds, glaciers > 1 km^{2} (0.386 sq mi or 247 acres) and river estuaries.

Ria-Sirach (French pronunciation: [ʁja siʁak]; Catalan: Rià i Cirac) is a commune in the Pyrénées-Orientales department in southern France.

== Geography ==
Ria-sirach is in the canton of Les Pyrénées catalanes and in the arrondissement of Prades.

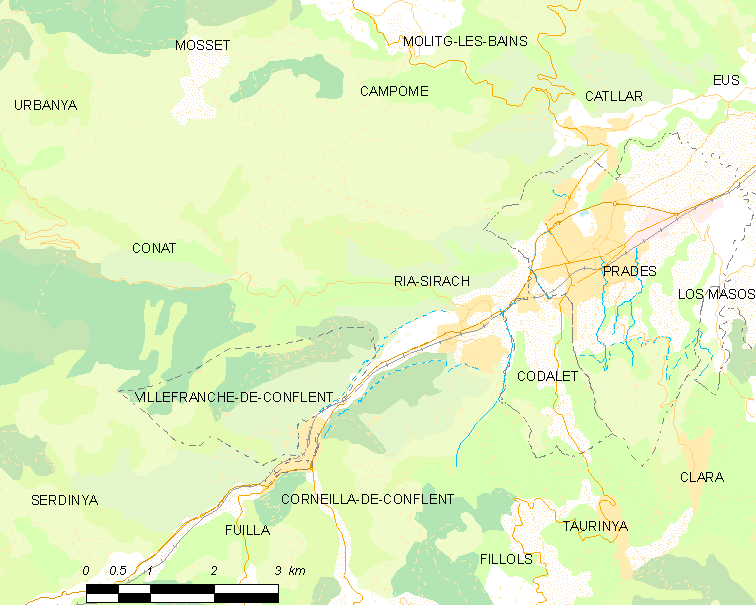
Map of Ria-Sirach and its surrounding communes

== Population ==
Historical population
Year	Pop.	±% p.a.
1968	1,057	—
1975	1,028	−0.40%
1982	1,042	+0.19%
1990	1,017	−0.30%
1999	1,126	+1.14%
2007	1,175	+0.53%
2012	1,257	+1.36%
2017	1,325	+1.06%
2023	1,264	−0.78%
Source: INSEE

== See also ==
- Communes of the Pyrénées-Orientales department
