= Catllar =

Catllar Catllà
- Commune
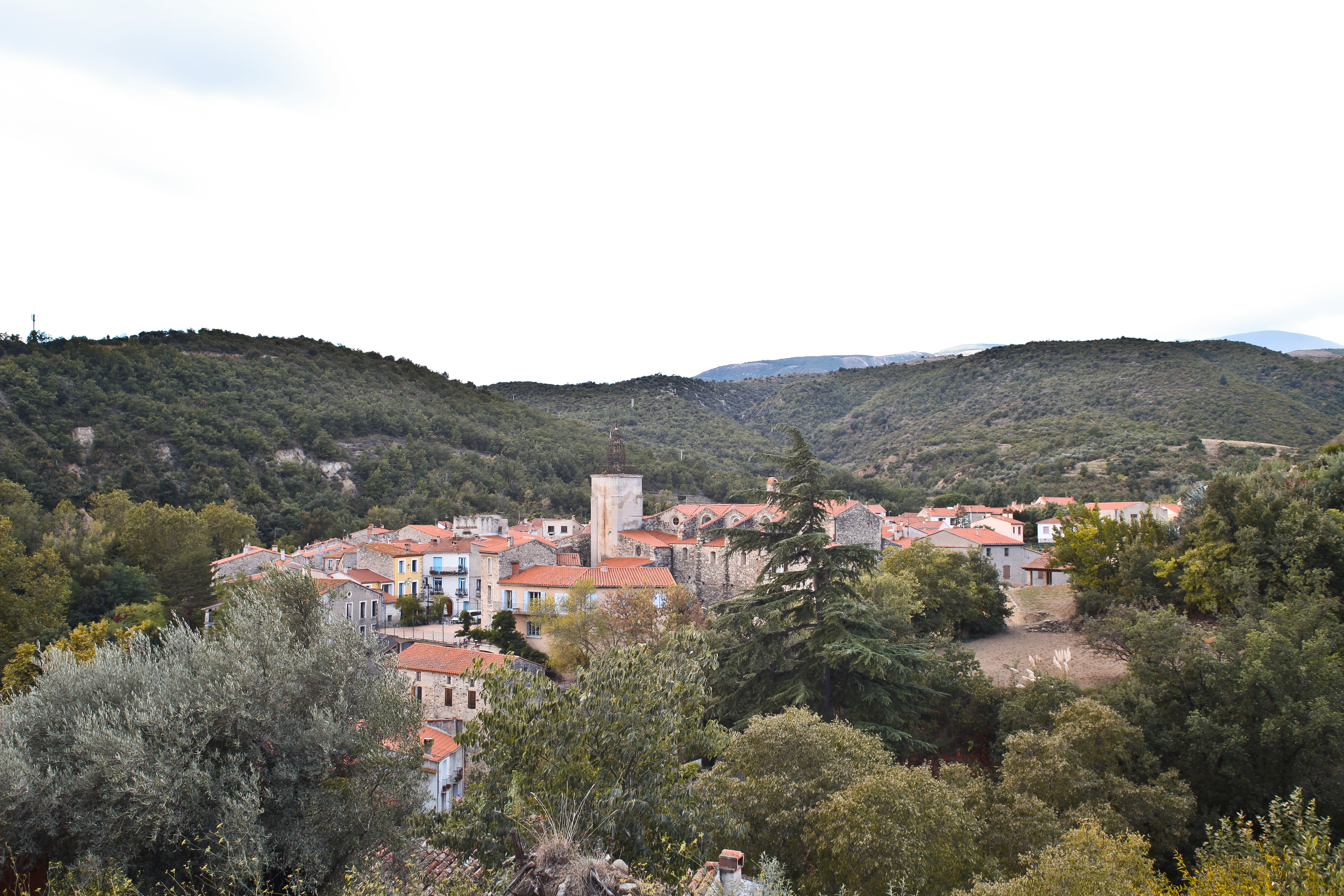
- A general view of Catllar

- Coat of arms
- Location of Catllar
- Location within France Location within Occitanie
- Coordinates: 42°38′04″N 2°25′23″E
- Country: France
- Region: Occitania
- Department: Pyrénées-Orientales
- Arrondissement: Prades
- Canton: Les Pyrénées catalanes
- Intercommunality: Conflent-Canigó

Government
  - Mayor (2020–2026): Josette Pujol
- Area^{1}: 8.02 km^{2} (3.10 sq mi)
- Elevation: 338 m (1,109 ft)
- Highest elevation: 771 m (2,530 ft)
- Lowest elevation: 288 m (945 ft)
- Population (2023): 723
  - Density: 90.1/km^{2} (233/sq mi)
- Time zone: UTC+01:00 (CET)
  - Summer (DST): UTC+02:00 (CEST)
- INSEE/Postal code: 66045 /66500
- ^{1} French Land Register data, which excludes lakes, ponds, glaciers > 1 km^{2} (0.386 sq mi or 247 acres) and river estuaries.

Catllar (French pronunciation: [kaja]; Catalan: Catllà, IPA: [kəʎˈʎa]) is a commune in the Pyrénées-Orientales department in southern France.

== Geography ==
=== Localisation ===
Catllar is located in the canton of Les Pyrénées catalanes and in the arrondissement of Prades.

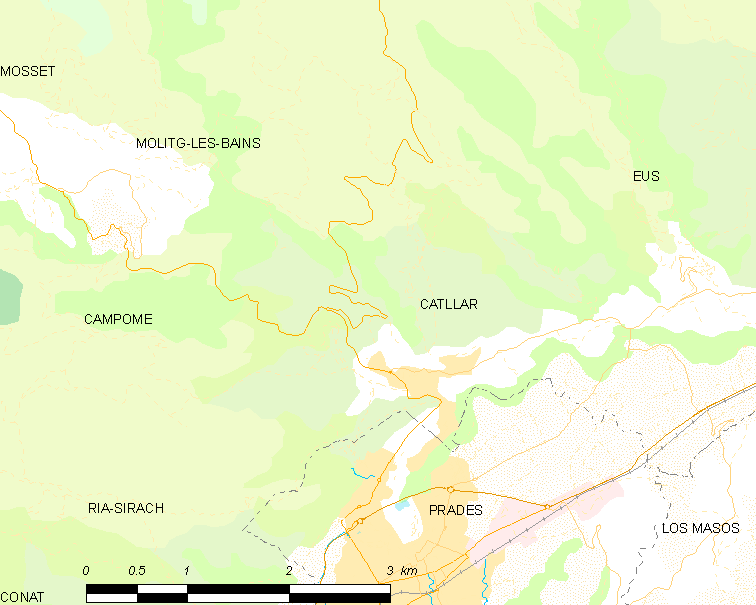
Map of Catllar and its surrounding communes

== Government and politics ==
=== Mayors ===
Mayor	Term start	Term end
Paul Bertran	1793	1793
Gaudérique Fuster	1793	1794
Paul Bertran	1795	1805
Jean Pallarès	1805	June 4, 1815
Joseph Pallarès	June 4, 1815	? 1815
Jean Pallarès	? 1815	1816
Jérôme Sabater	1816	1821
Raymond Vernis	1821	1830
Joseph Pallarès	1830	1831
Gabriel Vernis	1831	1835
Raymond Vernis	1835	1843
Alexandre Picon	1843	1884
Marcel Acezat	1884	1896
Hippolyte Freixe	1896	1904
Joseph Gueyne	1904	1912
Jean Marc	1912	1919
Joseph Marc	1919	1929
André Bernard	1929	1931
Jean Rous	1931	1935
Ange Carboneil	1935	1937
Barthélémy Vernet	1937	1941
Michel Grau	1944	1951
Vincent Gueyne	1951	1959
Roger Vernet	1959	1981
José Gali	1981	1991
Marcel Marc	1991	?
Jean Bigeat	2001	2008
Josette Pujol	2008	

== Population ==
Historical population
Year	Pop.	±% p.a.
1968	353	—
1975	535	+6.12%
1982	617	+2.06%
1990	692	+1.44%
1999	639	−0.88%
2007	693	+1.02%
2012	716	+0.66%
2017	771	+1.49%
2023	723	−1.07%
Source: INSEE

== See also ==
- Communes of the Pyrénées-Orientales department
