= Fuilla =

Fuilla Fullà
- Commune
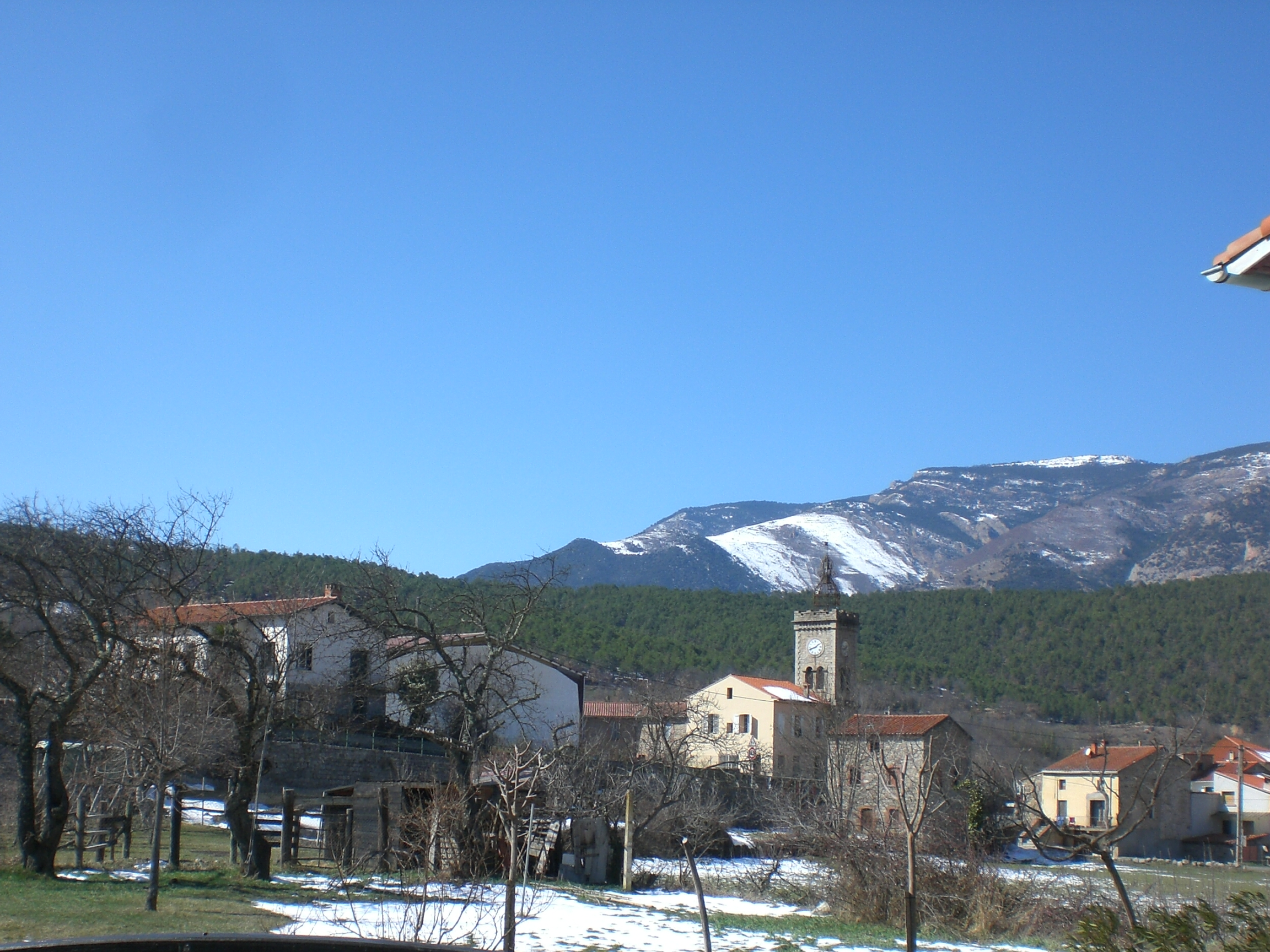
- The church and surrounding buildings in winter

- Coat of arms
- Location of Fuilla
- Location within France Location within Occitanie
- Coordinates: 42°33′46″N 2°21′48″E
- Country: France
- Region: Occitania
- Department: Pyrénées-Orientales
- Arrondissement: Prades
- Canton: Le Canigou

Government
  - Mayor (2024–2026): Régis Terrieu
- Area^{1}: 9.69 km^{2} (3.74 sq mi)
- Elevation: 547 m (1,795 ft)
- Highest elevation: 1,171 m (3,842 ft)
- Lowest elevation: 430 m (1,410 ft)
- Population (2023): 435
  - Density: 44.9/km^{2} (116/sq mi)
- Time zone: UTC+01:00 (CET)
  - Summer (DST): UTC+02:00 (CEST)
- INSEE/Postal code: 66085 /66820
- ^{1} French Land Register data, which excludes lakes, ponds, glaciers > 1 km^{2} (0.386 sq mi or 247 acres) and river estuaries.

Fuilla (French pronunciation: [fɥija]; Catalan: Fullà) is a commune in the Pyrénées-Orientales department in southern France.

== Geography ==
Fuilla is located in the canton of Le Canigou and in the arrondissement of Prades.

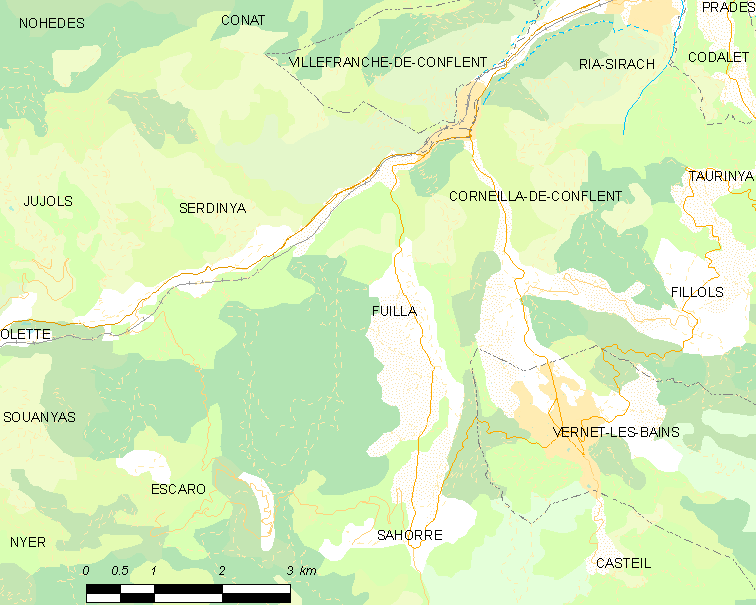
Map of Fuilla and its surrounding communes

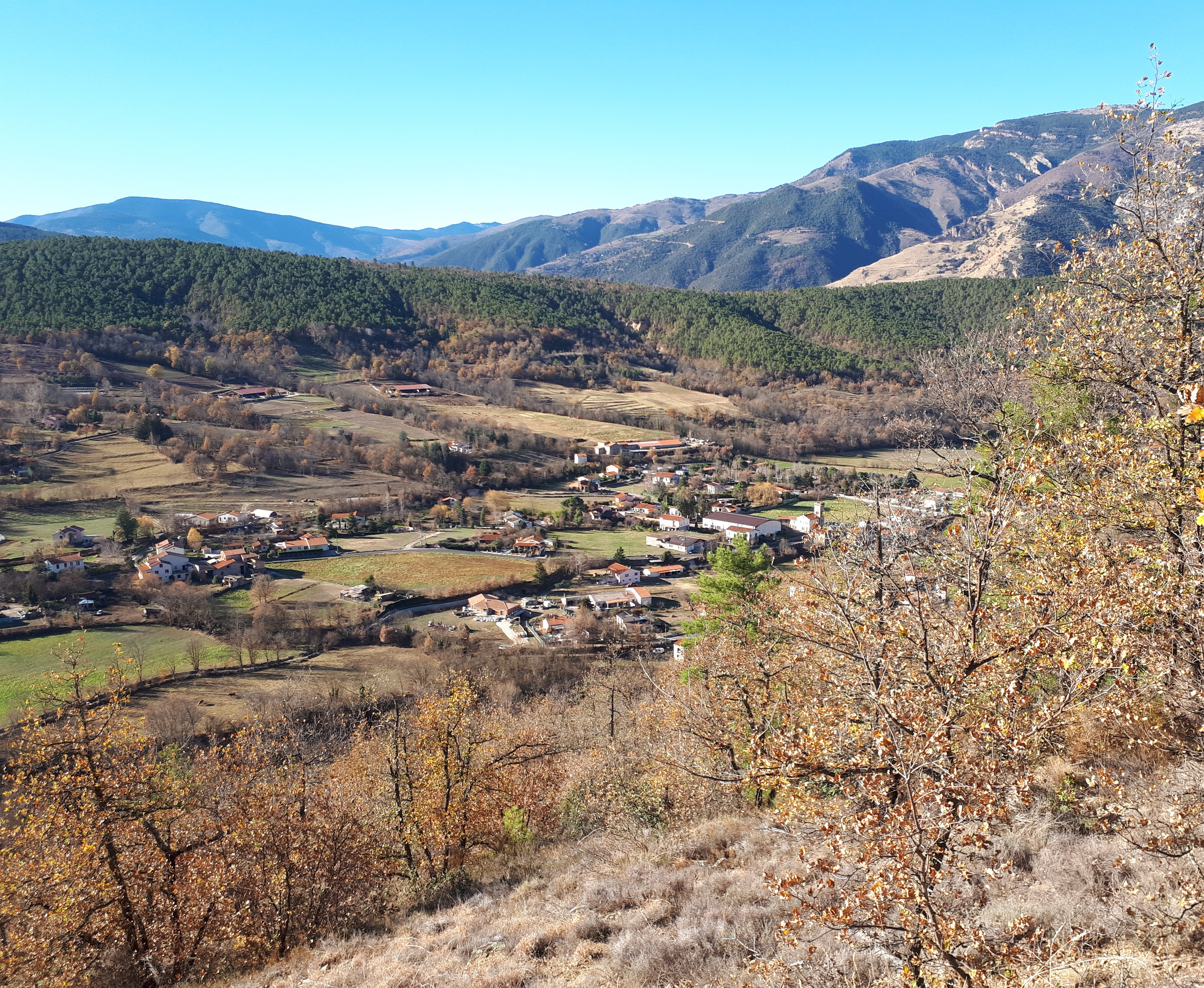
View across the central part of the commune, in the Rotja valley.

== Population ==
Historical population
| Year | Pop. | ±% p.a. |
|---|---|---|
| 1968 | 266 | — |
| 1975 | 233 | −1.87% |
| 1982 | 254 | +1.24% |
| 1990 | 297 | +1.97% |
| 1999 | 329 | +1.14% |
| 2007 | 365 | +1.31% |
| 2012 | 430 | +3.33% |
| 2017 | 448 | +0.82% |
| 2023 | 435 | −0.49% |
Source: INSEE

== Sainte-Eulalie de Fuilla ==
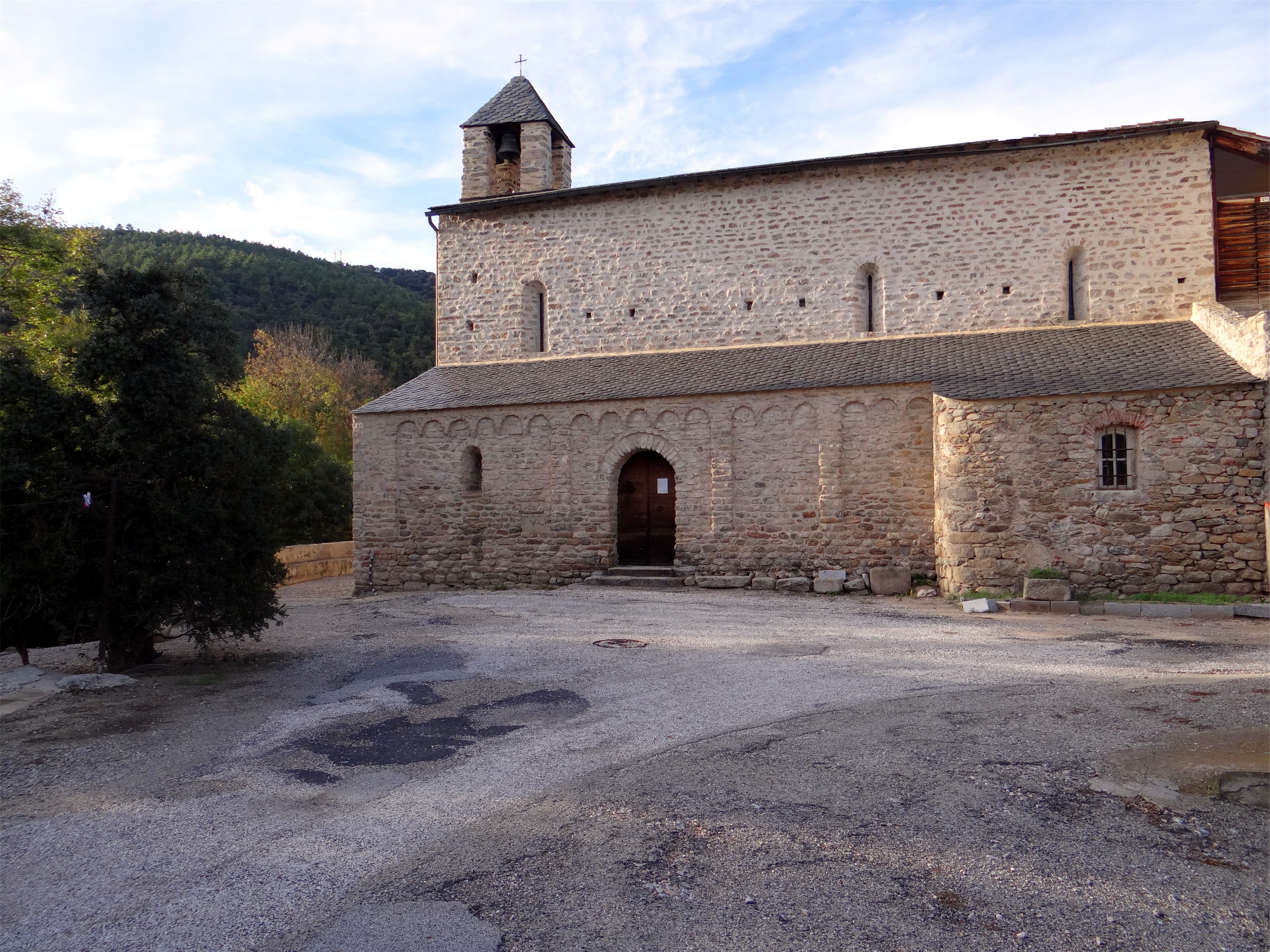
Sainte-Eulalie de Fuilla

The early Romanesque church of Sainte-Eulalie, in the lower part of Fuilla, is a designated historic monument of considerable regional and historical interest. Consecrated in 1031, it has been described as "the most distinctive parish church in Conflent". This is because, in particular, the church has a prominent and beautiful clerestory - where the nave is elevated well above the roof lines of the aisles on either side. For this reason, Sainte-Eulalie has been cited as a prototype for the later, larger and better-known Romanesque church of Sant Vicenç de Cardona, in Catalonia. Also, and unlike most churches in Conflent, Sainte-Eulalie was not constructed under the patronage of either of the two nearby Benedictine abbeys, Saint-Michel de Cuxa and Saint-Martin du Canigou. Exceptionally, the building programme at Fuilla was sponsored by the local population.

== See also ==
- Communes of the Pyrénées-Orientales department
