= Canton of Thuir =

Coordinates: 42°37′59″N 2°45′26″E

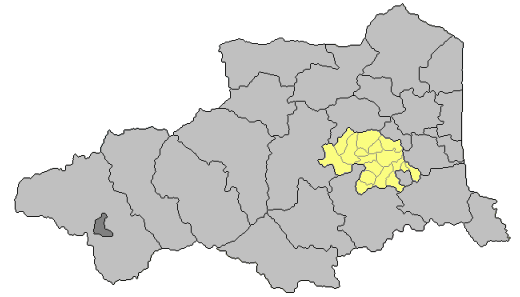
Location of the canton in Pyrénées-Orientales

The Canton of Thuir is a former French canton of Pyrénées-Orientales department, in Languedoc-Roussillon. It had 22,262 inhabitants (2012). It was disbanded in 2015.

The canton comprised the following communes:

- Brouilla
- Caixas
- Camélas
- Castelnou
- Fourques
- Llauro
- Llupia
- Passa
- Ponteilla
- Saint-Jean-Lasseille
- Sainte-Colombe-de-la-Commanderie
- Terrats
- Thuir
- Tordères
- Tresserre
- Trouillas
- Villemolaque
