= Calmeilles =

Calmeilles Calmella
- Commune
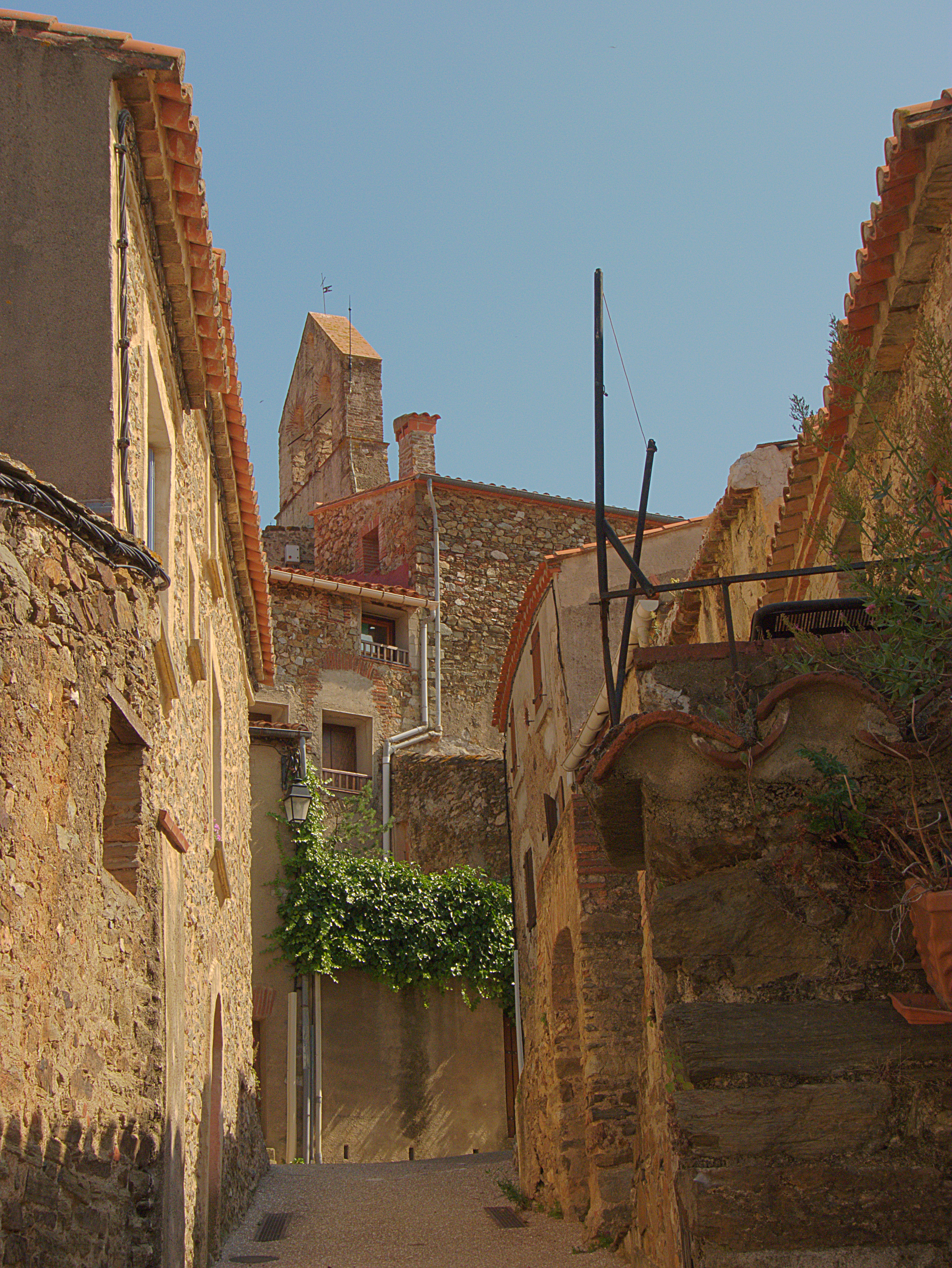
- A street leading to the small square of Pedrissos, in Calmeilles
- Location of Calmeilles
- Location within France Location within Occitanie
- Coordinates: 42°33′11″N 2°40′30″E
- Country: France
- Region: Occitania
- Department: Pyrénées-Orientales
- Arrondissement: Céret
- Canton: Les Aspres
- Intercommunality: Aspres

Government
  - Mayor (2020–2026): Gérard Chinaud
- Area^{1}: 13.22 km^{2} (5.10 sq mi)
- Elevation: 469 m (1,539 ft)
- Highest elevation: 784 m (2,572 ft)
- Lowest elevation: 256 m (840 ft)
- Population (2023): 60
  - Density: 4.5/km^{2} (12/sq mi)
- Time zone: UTC+01:00 (CET)
  - Summer (DST): UTC+02:00 (CEST)
- INSEE/Postal code: 66032 /66400
- ^{1} French Land Register data, which excludes lakes, ponds, glaciers > 1 km^{2} (0.386 sq mi or 247 acres) and river estuaries.

Calmeilles (French pronunciation: [kalmɛj]; Catalan: Calmella) is a commune in the Pyrénées-Orientales department in southern France. Historically and culturally, the commune is in the Aspres region, a small Roussillon territory between the Têt valley in the North and the Tech valley in the South.

Exposed to a principally oceanic climate, it is drained by the Canterrane and Ample rivers, and various other smaller ones. The commune has three natural areas of ecological, faunal and floral interest.

Calmeilles is a rural commune with 60 inhabitants in 2021, having experienced a peak population of 384 in 1821. It is part of the “aire d'attraction de Perpignan” (Perpignan attraction area). Its inhabitants are called Calmeillens or Calmeillennes.

== Geography ==
Calmeilles is in the canton of Les Aspres and in the arrondissement of Céret.

It is 24 km (as the crow flies) from Perpignan, prefecture of the Pyrénées-Orientales department, 10 km from Céret, sub-prefecture, and 11 km from Thuir, the seat of the canton of Les Aspres on which the commune has depended since 2015 for departmental elections. The commune is also part of the “bassin de vie” of Céret.

The nearest municipalities are: Oms (2.0 km), Taillet (2.8 km), Caixas (3.5 km), Prunet-et-Belpuig (4.2 km), Saint-Marsal (4.6 km), Taulis (4.6 km), Montauriol (4.9 km), and Llauro (5.7 km).

Historically and culturally, Calmeilles is part of the Aspres region. Between the valleys of Têt to the North and the Tech to the South, the tiny Roussillon territory takes its name from the stony nature of the soil found there.

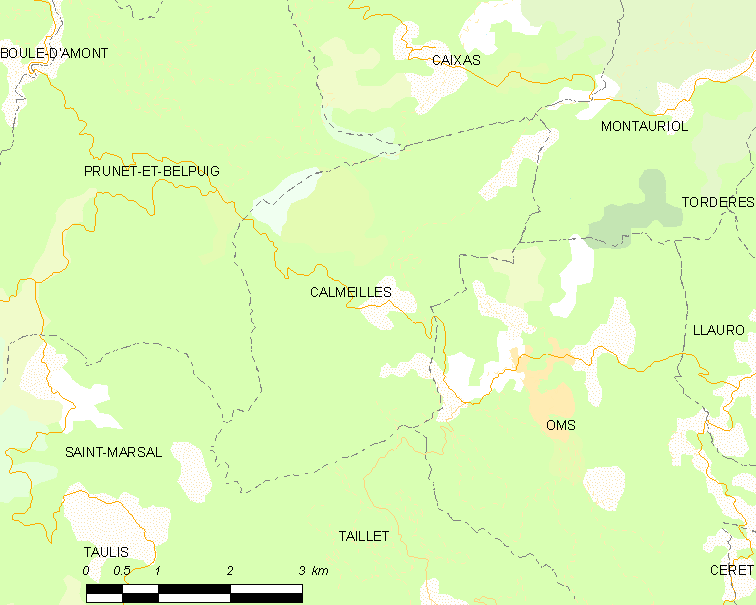
Map of Calmeilles and its surrounding communes

== Government and politics ==
=== Mayors ===
| Mayor | Term start | Term end |
|---|---|---|
| Brigitte Baux | 2001 | 2014 |
| Gérard Chinaud | 2014 | |

== Population ==
Historical population
| Year | Pop. | ±% p.a. |
|---|---|---|
| 1968 | 45 | — |
| 1975 | 46 | +0.31% |
| 1982 | 37 | −3.06% |
| 1990 | 41 | +1.29% |
| 1999 | 42 | +0.27% |
| 2007 | 61 | +4.78% |
| 2012 | 65 | +1.28% |
| 2017 | 59 | −1.92% |
| 2023 | 60 | +0.28% |
Source: INSEE

== See also ==
- Communes of the Pyrénées-Orientales department
