= Canton of Céret =

Coordinates: 42°28′43″N 2°47′43″E

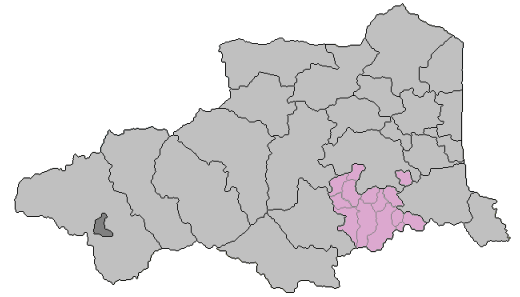
Location of the canton in Pyrénées-Orientales

The Canton of Céret is a French former canton of Pyrénées-Orientales department, in Languedoc-Roussillon. It had 22,167 inhabitants (2012). It was disbanded following the French canton reorganisation which came into effect in March 2015.

== History ==
The canton of Céret was created in 1790 as part of the district of Céret, and then of the arrondissement of Céret.

The commune of Les Cluses was separated from the canton of Laroque and attached to the canton of Céret in 1801.

Following various incidents the elections of 1858 for the canton of Céret were cancelled in 1859 and a new councillor was then elected.

The commune of L'Albère was separated from the canton of Argelès-sur-Mer and attached to the canton of Céret in 1947.

== Composition ==
The canton comprised the following communes:

- Céret
- L'Albère
- Banyuls-dels-Aspres
- Le Boulou
- Calmeilles
- Les Cluses
- Maureillas-las-Illas
- Montauriol
- Oms
- Le Perthus
- Reynès
- Saint-Jean-Pla-de-Corts
- Taillet
- Vivès
