= Passa =

Passa may refer to:

== People ==
- Chiara Passa (born 1973), Italian visual artist
- François Jaubert de Passa (1785-1856), French engineer and politician

== Places ==
- Passa, Pyrénées-Orientales, France
- Pässä, Võru County, Estonia
- Passa Cinco River, São Paulo, Brazil
- Passa Dois River, Paraná, Brazil
- Passa Quatro, Minas Gerais, Brazil
- Passa Sete, Rio Grande do Sul, Brazil
- Passa Tempo, Minas Gerais, Brazil
- Passa Três River, Paraná, Brazil
- Passa Una River, Paraná, Brazil
- Passa e Fica, Rio Grande do Norte, Brazil
- Passa-Vinte, Minas Gerais, Brazil

== Other ==
- Passa, moth also known as gastrina
- Passa, a local weekly newspaper published in Warsaw, Poland
- Passa Passa, Jamaican weekly street party
