= Canton of Les Aspres =

Coordinates: 42°37′59″N 2°45′26″E

The Canton of Les Aspres is a French canton of Pyrénées-Orientales department, in Occitanie. At the French canton reorganisation which came into effect in March 2015, the canton was created including 17 communes from the canton of Thuir, 4 from the canton of Céret and 1 from the canton of Toulouges. Its seat is in Thuir.

== Composition ==
- Banyuls-dels-Aspres
- Brouilla
- Caixas
- Calmeilles
- Camélas
- Castelnou
- Fourques
- Llauro
- Llupia
- Montauriol
- Oms
- Passa
- Pollestres
- Ponteilla
- Saint-Jean-Lasseille
- Sainte-Colombe-de-la-Commanderie
- Terrats
- Thuir
- Tordères
- Tresserre
- Trouillas
- Villemolaque
