= Tech (river) =

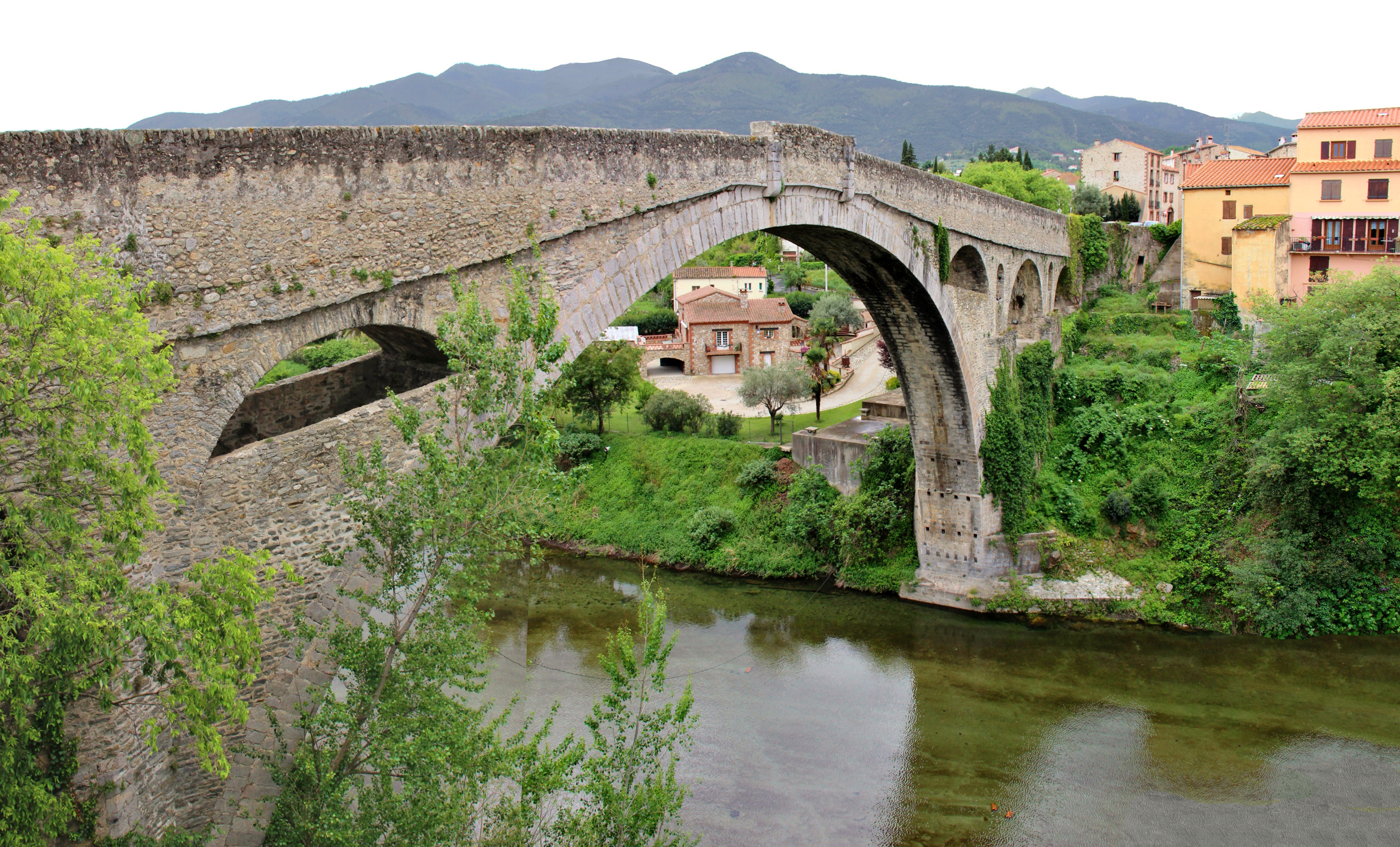
- Pont du Diable, spanning the Tech, in Céret

Location
- Country: France

Physical characteristics
- Source
  - location: Pyrenees
  - elevation: ±2,500 m (8,200 ft)
- Mouth
  - location: Mediterranean Sea
  - coordinates: 42°35′24″N 3°2′43″E
- Length: 84.5 km (52.5 mi)
- Basin size: 750 km^{2} (290 mi^{2})
- Discharge
  - average: 9.6 m^{3}/s (340 cu ft/s)

The Tech (French: [tɛk]; Catalan: Tec [ˈtɛk]) is a river in southern France, very close to the French-Spanish border. It runs through a valley in the Pyrénées-Orientales, in the former Roussillon, and is 84.5 kilometres (52.5 mi) long. Its source is the Parcigoule Valley, elevation 2,500 metres (8,200 ft), and it feeds the Mediterranean Sea. At Céret, the medieval Devil's bridge, once the largest bridge arch in the world, spans the river in an arc of 45 metres (148 ft) in length.

== Geography ==
The Tech flows through 25 different towns, from its source to the sea: Prats-de-Mollo-la-Preste, Serralongue, Le Tech, Saint-Laurent-de-Cerdans, Montferrer, Corsavy, Arles-sur-Tech, Montbolo, Amélie-les-Bains-Palalda, Reynès, Céret, Saint-Jean-Pla-de-Corts, Maureillas-las-Illas, Le Boulou, Tresserre, Saint-Génis-des-Fontaines, Montesquieu-des-Albères, Banyuls-dels-Aspres, Villelongue-dels-Monts, Brouilla, Ortaffa, Palau-del-Vidre, Elne and Argelès-sur-Mer. It flows into the Mediterranean Sea between Saint-Cyprien and Argelès-sur-Mer, southeast of Perpignan.

== In culture ==
Poetry

- (in French) Ode au Tech [Ode to the Tech] (1912), a poem by the writer Marc Anfossi.
