= François Jaubert de Passa =

French engineer and politician (1785-1856)

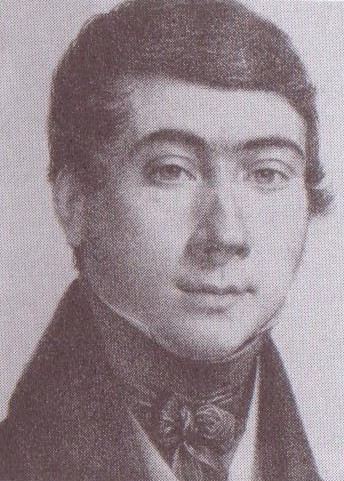
- François Jaubert de Passa
- Born: April 24, 1785; Céret
- Died: September 16, 1856 (aged 71); Passa
- Occupations: agricultural engineer, historian, politician

François Jaubert de Passa (born in Céret in 1785 and died in Passa in 1856) was a French engineer and politician.

== Biography ==
François Jaubert de Passa died in Perpignan on 16 September 1856, at the #4 in Sainte-Dominique street.

== Political offices ==
François Jaubert de Passa had a political career as a general councillor.

- 1836-1846 : General councillor for the canton of Thuir.
- 1848-1856 : General councillor for the canton of Vinça.
- 5 October 1848 – 25 January 1853 : President of the Pyrénées-Orientales General council.
