= Arrondissement of Céret =

Coordinates: 42°29′09″N 2°44′59″E

Céret
- Arrondissement
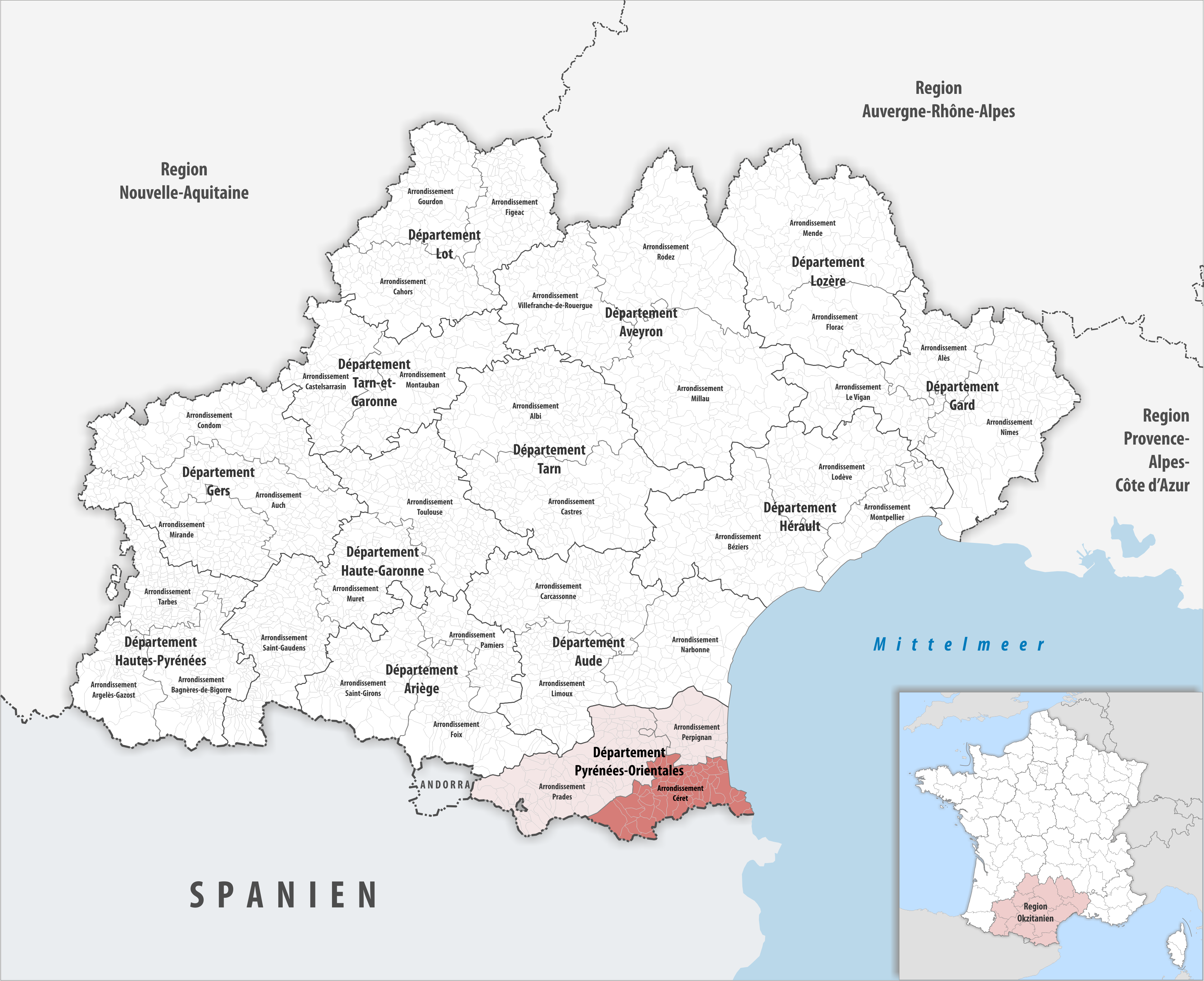
- Location within the region Occitanie
- Country: France
- Region: Occitania
- Department: Pyrénées-Orientales
- No. of communes: {{{nbcomm}}}
- Area: 1,214.1 km^{2} (468.8 sq mi)
- Population (2023): 137,271
  - Density: 113.06/km^{2} (292.83/sq mi)
- INSEE code: 661

The arrondissement of Céret is an arrondissement of France in the Pyrénées-Orientales department (Northern Catalonia) in the Occitanie region. It has 64 communes. Its population is 134,629 (2021), and its area is 1,214.1 km^{2} (468.8 sq mi).

== Composition ==
The communes of the arrondissement of Céret, and their INSEE codes, are:

1. L'Albère (66001)
2. Alénya (66002)
3. Amélie-les-Bains-Palalda (66003)
4. Argelès-sur-Mer (66008)
5. Arles-sur-Tech (66009)
6. Bages (66011)
7. Banyuls-dels-Aspres (66015)
8. Banyuls-sur-Mer (66016)
9. La Bastide (66018)
10. Le Boulou (66024)
11. Brouilla (66026)
12. Caixas (66029)
13. Calmeilles (66032)
14. Camélas (66033)
15. Castelnou (66044)
16. Cerbère (66048)
17. Céret (66049)
18. Les Cluses (66063)
19. Collioure (66053)
20. Corneilla-del-Vercol (66059)
21. Corsavy (66060)
22. Coustouges (66061)
23. Elne (66065)
24. Fourques (66084)
25. Lamanère (66091)
26. Laroque-des-Albères (66093)
27. Latour-Bas-Elne (66094)
28. Llauro (66099)
29. Maureillas-las-Illas (66106)
30. Montauriol (66112)
31. Montbolo (66113)
32. Montescot (66114)
33. Montesquieu-des-Albères (66115)
34. Montferrer (66116)
35. Oms (66126)
36. Ortaffa (66129)
37. Palau-del-Vidre (66133)
38. Passa (66134)
39. Le Perthus (66137)
40. Port-Vendres (66148)
41. Prats-de-Mollo-la-Preste (66150)
42. Reynès (66160)
43. Saint-André (66168)
44. Saint-Cyprien (66171)
45. Sainte-Colombe-de-la-Commanderie (66170)
46. Saint-Génis-des-Fontaines (66175)
47. Saint-Jean-Lasseille (66177)
48. Saint-Jean-Pla-de-Corts (66178)
49. Saint-Laurent-de-Cerdans (66179)
50. Saint-Marsal (66183)
51. Serralongue (66194)
52. Sorède (66196)
53. Taillet (66199)
54. Taulis (66203)
55. Le Tech (66206)
56. Terrats (66207)
57. Théza (66208)
58. Thuir (66210)
59. Tordères (66211)
60. Tresserre (66214)
61. Trouillas (66217)
62. Villelongue-dels-Monts (66225)
63. Villemolaque (66226)
64. Vivès (66233)

== History ==
The arrondissement of Céret was created in 1800. In January 2017, it gained 24 communes from the arrondissement of Perpignan.

As a result of the reorganisation of the cantons of France which came into effect in 2015, the borders of the cantons are no longer related to the borders of the arrondissements. The cantons of the arrondissement of Céret were, as of January 2015:

1. Argelès-sur-Mer
2. Arles-sur-Tech
3. Céret
4. Côte Vermeille
5. Prats-de-Mollo-la-Preste
