= Villemolaque =

Villemolaque Vilamulaca
- Commune
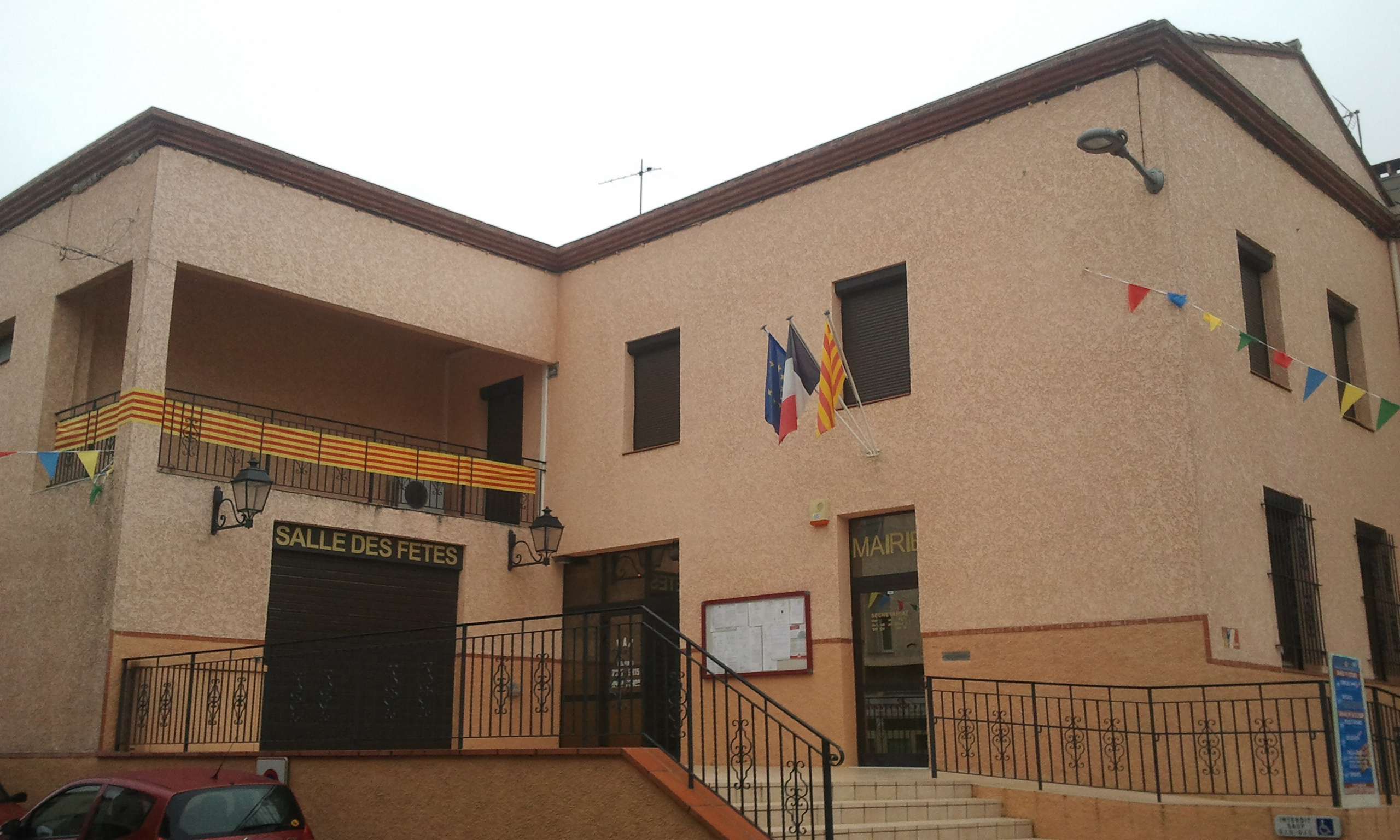
- Town hall of Villemolaque
- Location of Villemolaque
- Location within France Location within Occitanie
- Coordinates: 42°35′21″N 2°50′25″E
- Country: France
- Region: Occitania
- Department: Pyrénées-Orientales
- Arrondissement: Céret
- Canton: Les Aspres
- Intercommunality: Aspres

Government
  - Mayor (2020–2026): Annie Lelaurain
- Area^{1}: 6.00 km^{2} (2.32 sq mi)
- Elevation: 90 m (300 ft)
- Highest elevation: 121 m (397 ft)
- Lowest elevation: 57 m (187 ft)
- Population (2023): 1,278
  - Density: 213/km^{2} (552/sq mi)
- Time zone: UTC+01:00 (CET)
  - Summer (DST): UTC+02:00 (CEST)
- INSEE/Postal code: 66226 /66300
- ^{1} French Land Register data, which excludes lakes, ponds, glaciers > 1 km^{2} (0.386 sq mi or 247 acres) and river estuaries.

Villemolaque (French pronunciation: [vilmɔlak]; Catalan: Vilamulaca) is a commune in the Pyrénées-Orientales department in southern France.

== Geography ==
Villemolaque is located in the canton of Les Aspres and in the arrondissement of Perpignan.

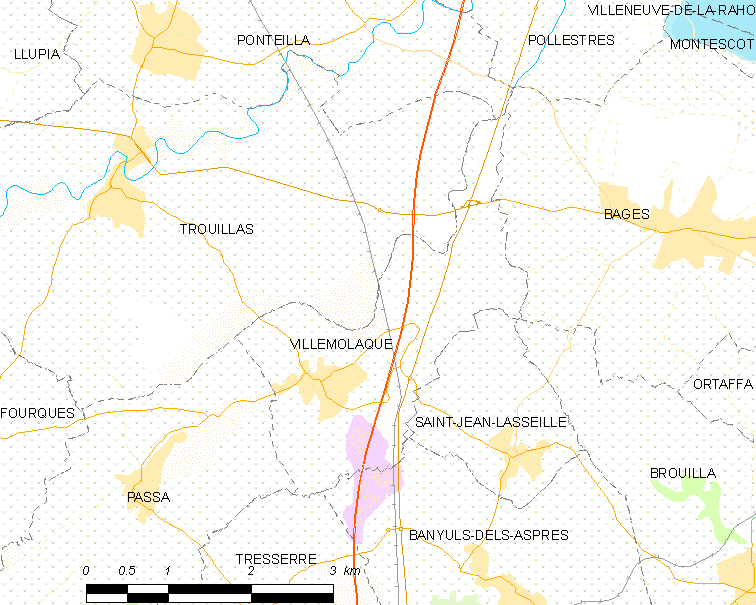
Map of Villemolaque and its surrounding communes

== Population ==
Historical population
Year	Pop.	±% p.a.
1968	504	—
1975	466	−1.11%
1982	480	+0.42%
1990	833	+7.13%
1999	922	+1.13%
2007	1,120	+2.46%
2012	1,191	+1.24%
2017	1,370	+2.84%
2023	1,278	−1.15%
Source: INSEE

== See also ==
- Communes of the Pyrénées-Orientales department
