= Llupia =

Llupia Llupià
- Commune
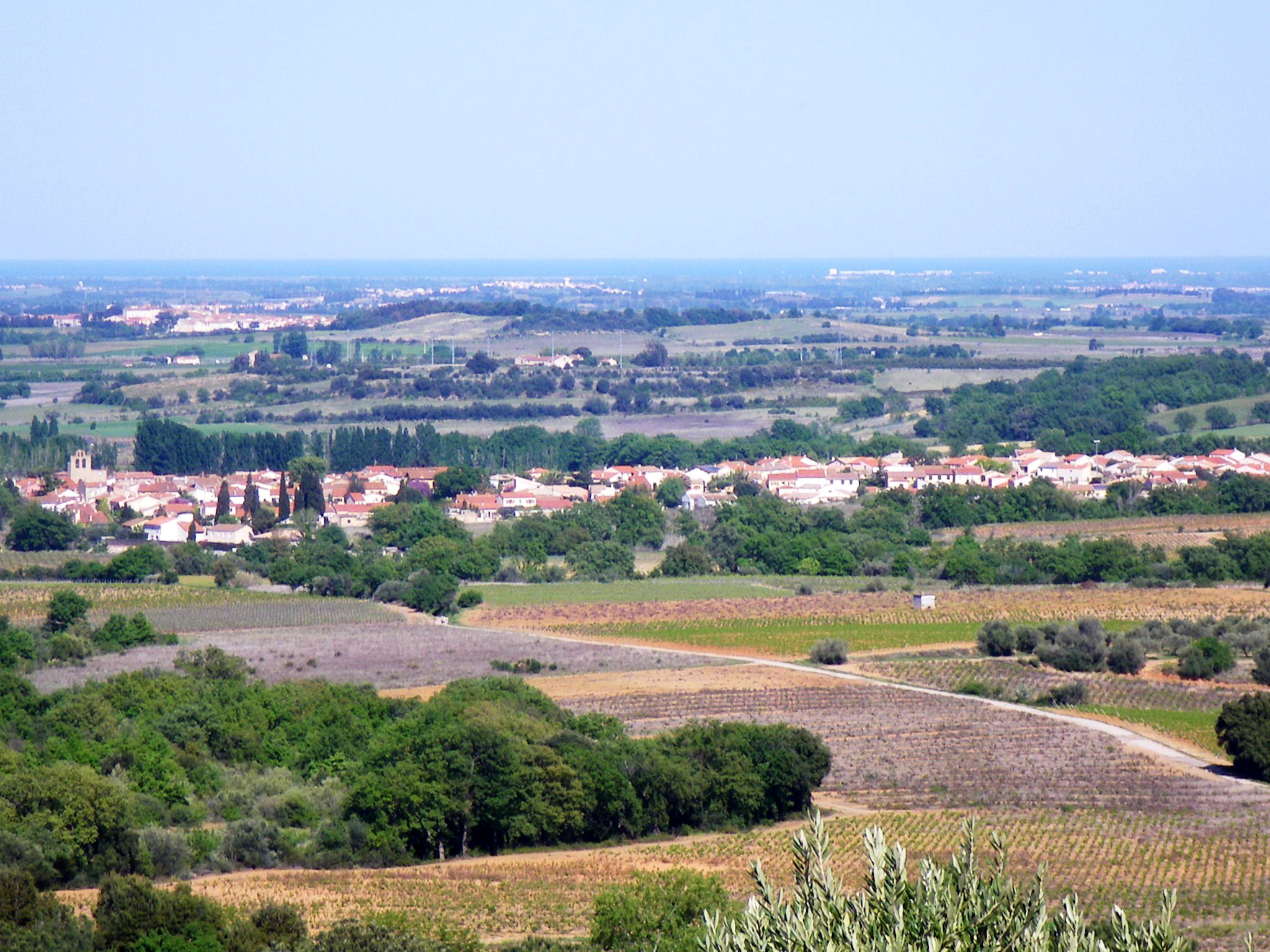
- A general view of Llupia

- Coat of arms
- Location of Llupia
- Location within France Location within Occitanie
- Coordinates: 42°37′18″N 2°46′11″E
- Country: France
- Region: Occitania
- Department: Pyrénées-Orientales
- Arrondissement: Perpignan
- Canton: Les Aspres
- Intercommunality: Perpignan Méditerranée Métropole

Government
  - Mayor (2020–2026): Roger Rigall
- Area^{1}: 6.88 km^{2} (2.66 sq mi)
- Elevation: 104 m (341 ft)
- Highest elevation: 140 m (460 ft)
- Lowest elevation: 88 m (289 ft)
- Population (2023): 2,199
  - Density: 320/km^{2} (828/sq mi)
- Time zone: UTC+01:00 (CET)
  - Summer (DST): UTC+02:00 (CEST)
- INSEE/Postal code: 66101 /66300
- ^{1} French Land Register data, which excludes lakes, ponds, glaciers > 1 km^{2} (0.386 sq mi or 247 acres) and river estuaries.

Llupia (French pronunciation: [jypja]; Catalan: Llupià) is a commune in the Pyrénées-Orientales department in southern France.

== Geography ==
Llupia is located in the canton of Les Aspres and in the arrondissement of Perpignan.

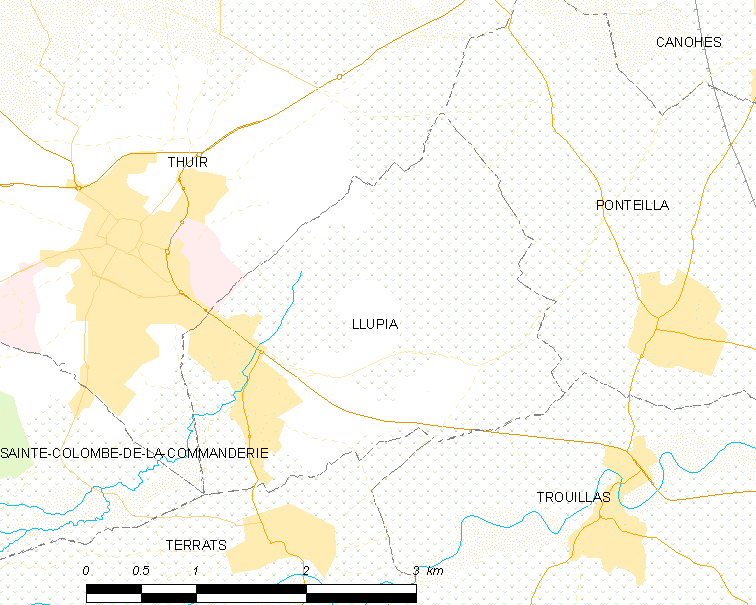
Map of Llupia and its surrounding communes

== Toponymy ==
The historical name in Catalan is Llupià.

== Government and politics ==
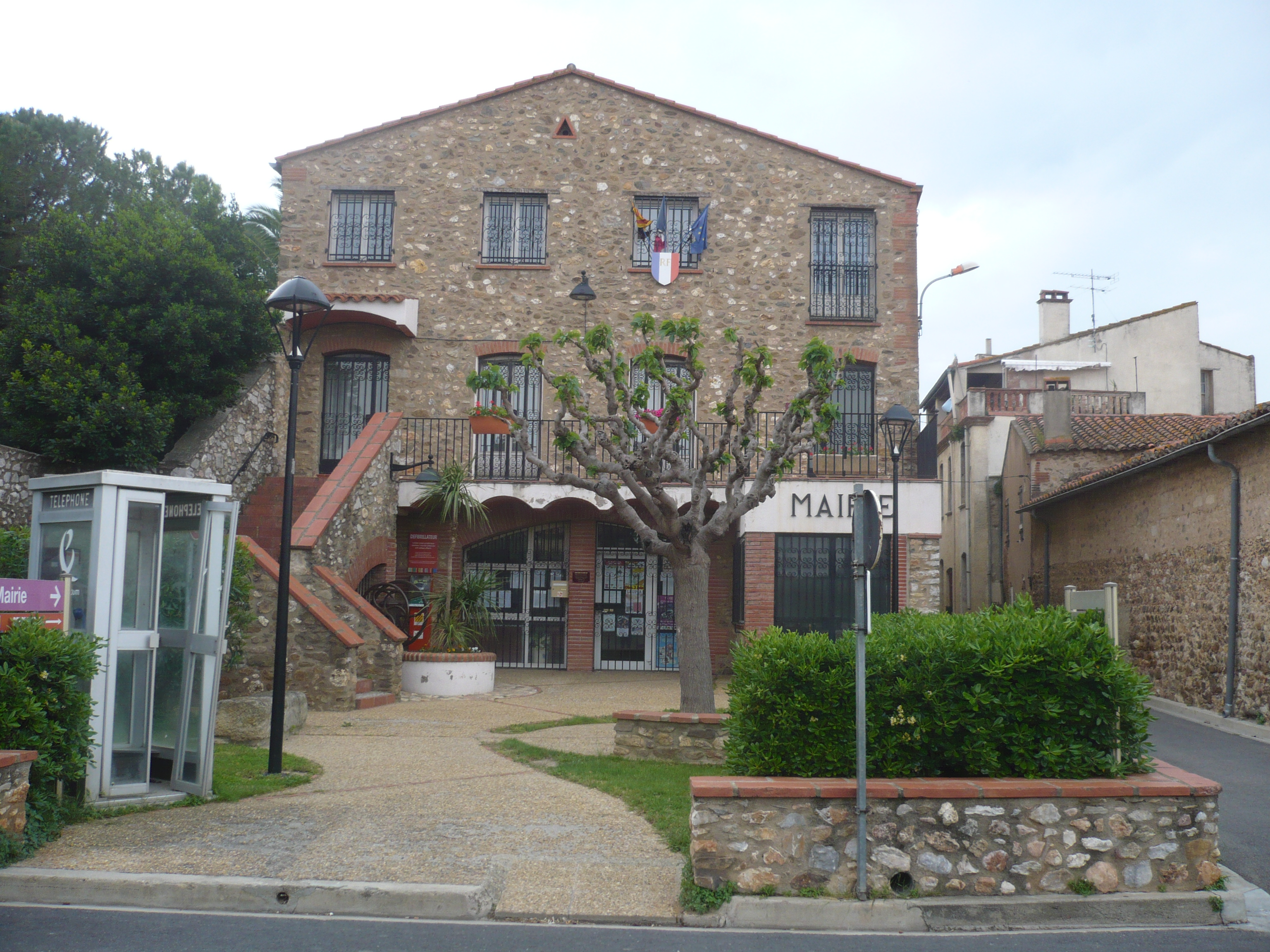
Town hall in Llupia

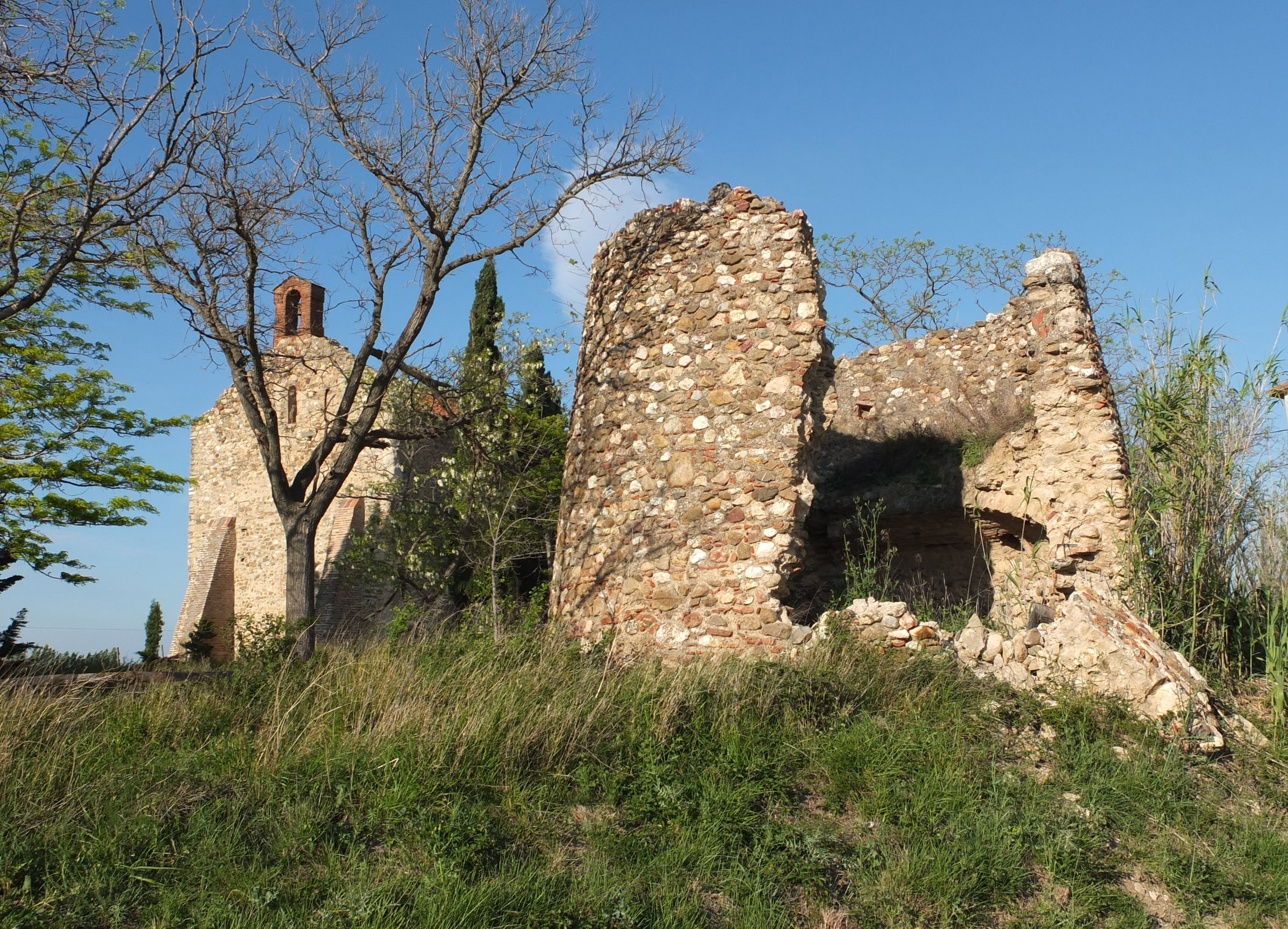
Ruins of the hamlet "Vilarmila", near Llupia, France, Romanesque church (11th ctry.) "Sainte-Marie de Vilarmila" in the background.

=== Mayors ===
Mayor	Term start	Term end
Roger Rigall	2001	

== Population ==
Historical population
Year	Pop.	±% p.a.
1968	282	—
1975	399	+5.08%
1982	931	+12.87%
1990	1,253	+3.78%
1999	1,734	+3.68%
2007	1,820	+0.61%
2012	1,960	+1.49%
2017	1,943	−0.17%
2023	2,199	+2.08%
Source: INSEE

== See also ==
- Communes of the Pyrénées-Orientales department
