= Tordères =

Tordères Torderes
- Commune
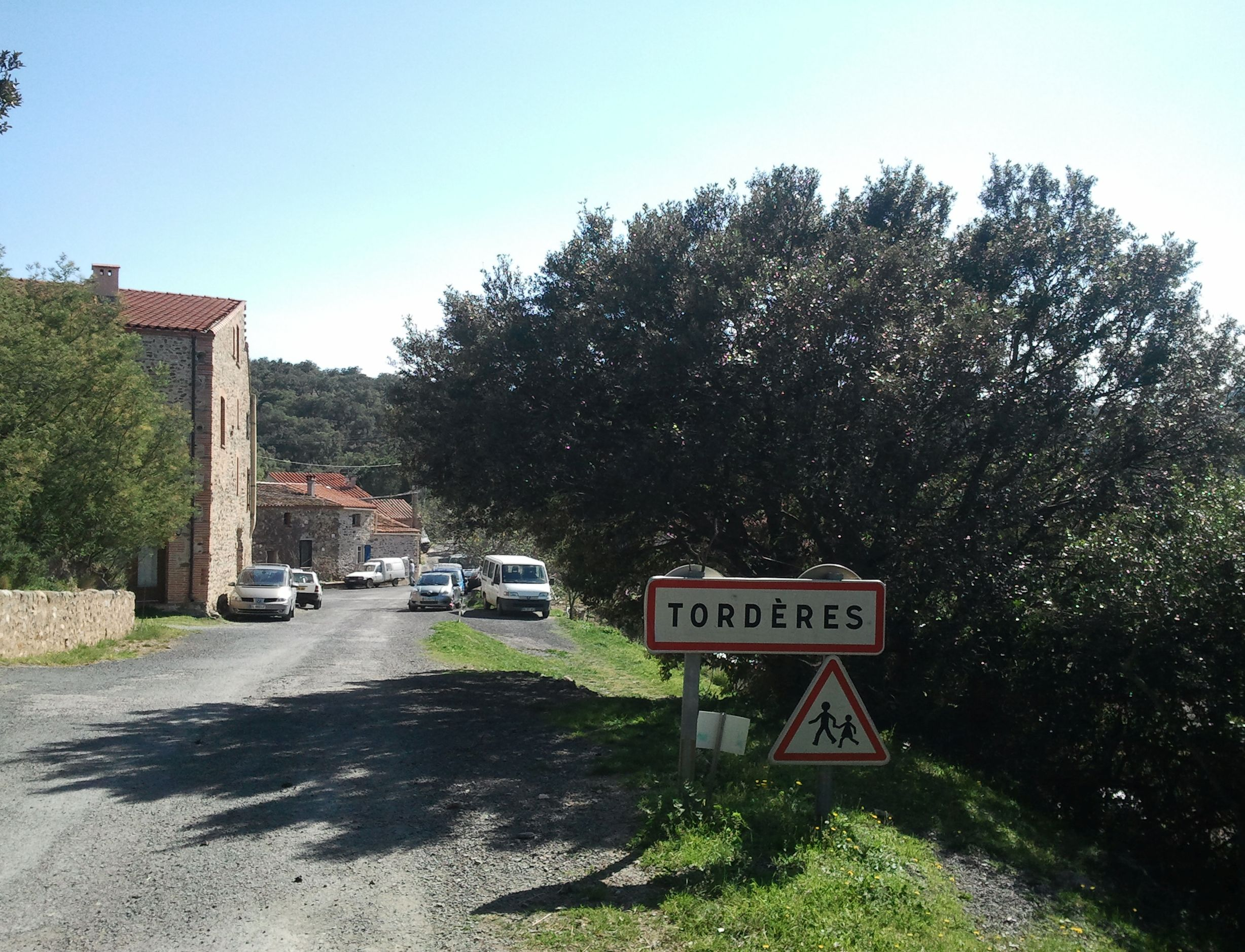
- Location of Tordères
- Location within France Location within Occitanie
- Coordinates: 42°33′39″N 2°45′11″E
- Country: France
- Region: Occitania
- Department: Pyrénées-Orientales
- Arrondissement: Céret
- Canton: Les Aspres
- Intercommunality: Aspres

Government
  - Mayor (2020–2026): Maya Lesné-Mathis
- Area^{1}: 9.91 km^{2} (3.83 sq mi)
- Highest elevation: 390 m (1,280 ft)
- Lowest elevation: 139 m (456 ft)
- Population (2023): 187
  - Density: 18.9/km^{2} (48.9/sq mi)
- Demonym: Tordérencs
- Time zone: UTC+01:00 (CET)
  - Summer (DST): UTC+02:00 (CEST)
- INSEE/Postal code: 66211 /66300
- Website: Blog de la mairie de Tordères
- ^{1} French Land Register data, which excludes lakes, ponds, glaciers > 1 km^{2} (0.386 sq mi or 247 acres) and river estuaries.

Tordères (French pronunciation: [tɔʁdɛʁ]; Catalan: Torderes) is a commune in the Pyrénées-Orientales department in southern France.

== Geography ==
=== Localisation ===
Tordères is located in the canton of Les Aspres and in the arrondissement of Perpignan.

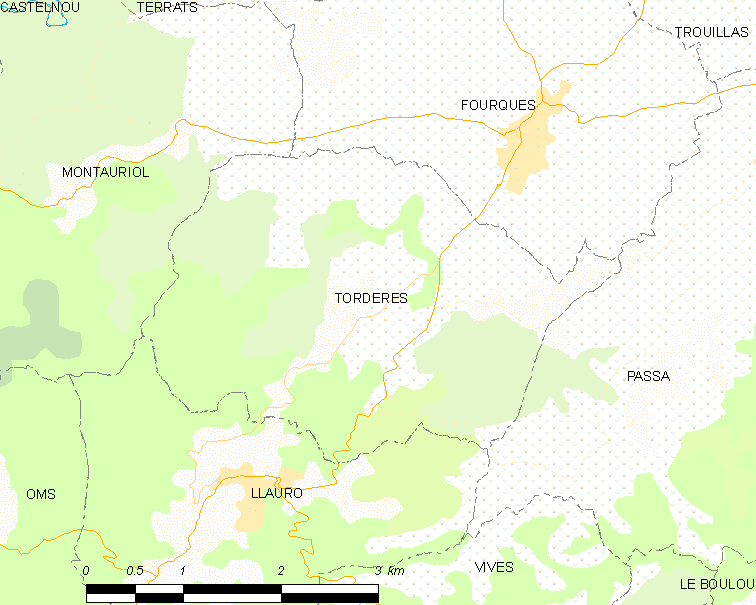
Map of Tordères and its surrounding communes

== Population ==
Historical population
Year	Pop.	±% p.a.
1968	60	—
1975	46	−3.72%
1982	50	+1.20%
1990	75	+5.20%
1999	145	+7.60%
2007	171	+2.08%
2012	166	−0.59%
2017	165	−0.12%
2023	187	+2.11%
Source: INSEE

== See also ==
- Communes of the Pyrénées-Orientales department
