= Camélas =

Camélas Cameles
- Commune
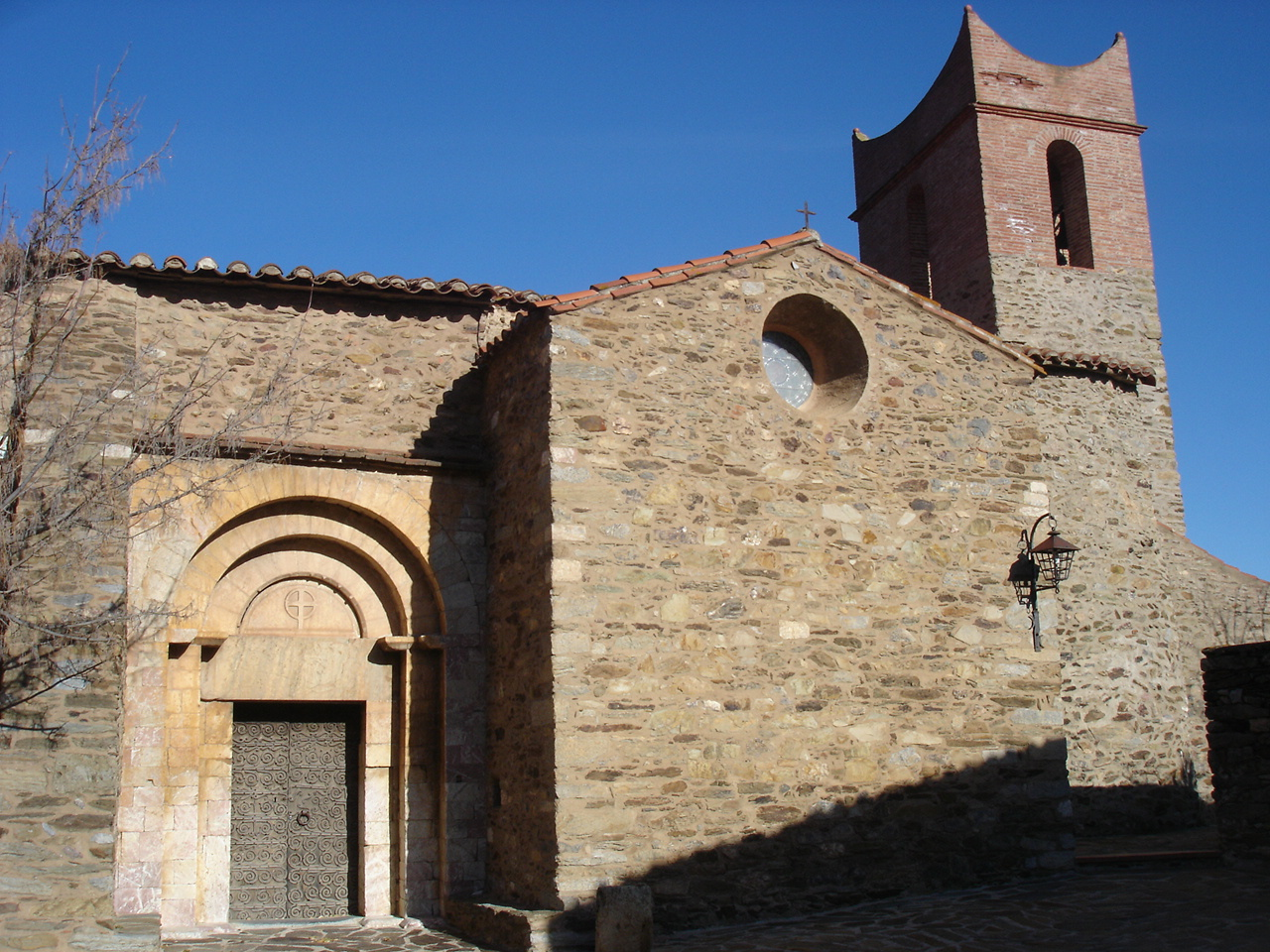
- The church of Saint-Fructeux, in Camélas
- Location of Camélas
- Location within France Location within Occitanie
- Coordinates: 42°39′08″N 2°42′20″E
- Country: France
- Region: Occitania
- Department: Pyrénées-Orientales
- Arrondissement: Céret
- Canton: Les Aspres
- Intercommunality: Aspres

Government
  - Mayor (2020–2026): Roger Bort
- Area^{1}: 12.72 km^{2} (4.91 sq mi)
- Elevation: 350 m (1,150 ft)
- Highest elevation: 520 m (1,710 ft)
- Lowest elevation: 118 m (387 ft)
- Population (2023): 461
  - Density: 36.2/km^{2} (93.9/sq mi)
- Time zone: UTC+01:00 (CET)
  - Summer (DST): UTC+02:00 (CEST)
- INSEE/Postal code: 66033 /66300
- ^{1} French Land Register data, which excludes lakes, ponds, glaciers > 1 km^{2} (0.386 sq mi or 247 acres) and river estuaries.

Camélas (French pronunciation: [kamelas]; Catalan: Cameles) is a commune in the Pyrénées-Orientales department in southern France.

== Geography ==
=== Localisation ===
Camélas is located in the canton of Les Aspres and in the arrondissement of Perpignan.

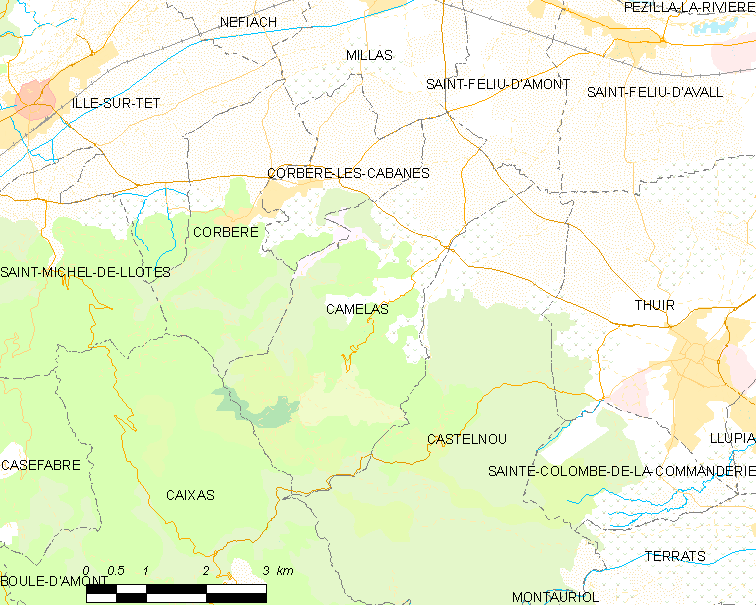
Map of Camélas and its surrounding communes

== Government and politics ==
=== Mayors ===
| Mayor | Term start | Term end |
|---|---|---|
| Joseph Brial | 1790 | 1792 |
| Jean Estebe | 1792 | 1793 |
| Jacques Utzy | 1793 | 1797 |
| François Massota | 1797 | 1799 |
| Antoine Massina | 1799 | 1815 |
| Étienne Brial Cubri | 1815 | 1815 |
| Antoine Massina | 1815 | 1830 |
| Étienne Brial Cubri | 1830 | 1838 |
| André Brial Galbe | 1838 | 1841 |
| François Brial Cubri | 1841 | 1846 |
| Jean Brial Parahy | 1846 | 1868 |
| Pierre Brial Brial | 1868 | 1872 |
| Joseph Brial Parahy | 1872 | 1881 |
| Jacques Aymerich | 1881 | 1888 |
| Pierre Brial Brial | 1888 | 1900 |
| Baptiste Brial | 1900 | 1918 |
| Jean Pastor | 1919 | 1929 |
| Emmanuel Roig | 1929 | 1935 |
| Jean Baux | 1935 | 1972 |
| Jean-Pierre Surjus | 1972 | 1983 |
| Isidore Vizcaino | 1983 | 2001 |
| Roger Bort | 2001 | |

== Population ==
Historical population
| Year | Pop. | ±% p.a. |
|---|---|---|
| 1968 | 289 | — |
| 1975 | 268 | −1.07% |
| 1982 | 308 | +2.01% |
| 1990 | 323 | +0.60% |
| 1999 | 396 | +2.29% |
| 2007 | 455 | +1.75% |
| 2012 | 417 | −1.73% |
| 2017 | 464 | +2.16% |
| 2023 | 461 | −0.11% |
Source: INSEE

== See also ==
- Communes of the Pyrénées-Orientales department
