= Terrats =

- Commune
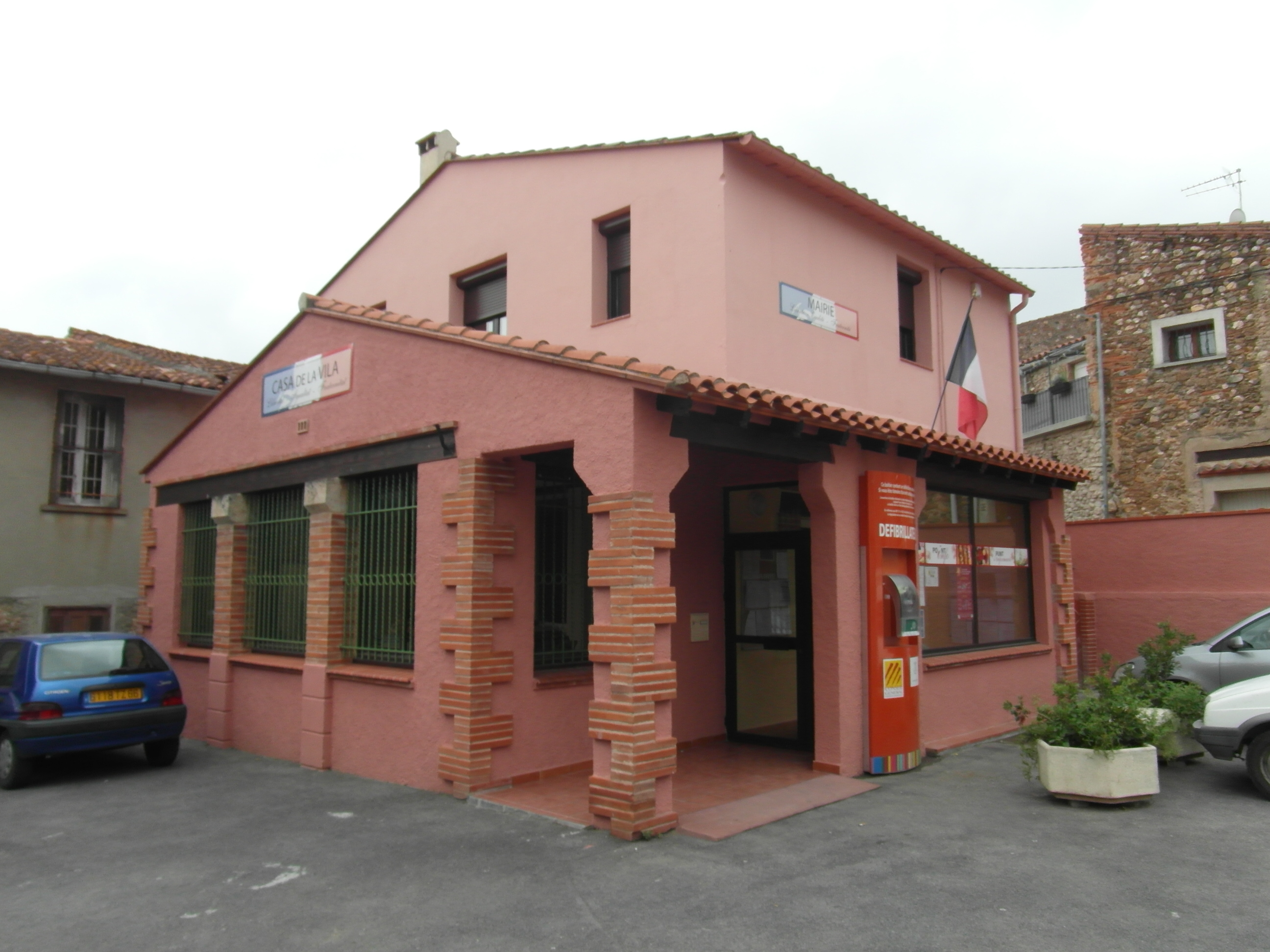
- The town hall in Terrats
- Location of Terrats
- Location within France Location within Occitanie
- Coordinates: 42°36′36″N 2°46′20″E
- Country: France
- Region: Occitania
- Department: Pyrénées-Orientales
- Arrondissement: Céret
- Canton: Les Aspres
- Intercommunality: Aspres

Government
  - Mayor (2020–2026): Carine Sales
- Area^{1}: 7.32 km^{2} (2.83 sq mi)
- Elevation: 138 m (453 ft)
- Highest elevation: 230 m (750 ft)
- Lowest elevation: 101 m (331 ft)
- Population (2023): 806
  - Density: 110/km^{2} (285/sq mi)
- Time zone: UTC+01:00 (CET)
  - Summer (DST): UTC+02:00 (CEST)
- INSEE/Postal code: 66207 /66300
- ^{1} French Land Register data, which excludes lakes, ponds, glaciers > 1 km^{2} (0.386 sq mi or 247 acres) and river estuaries.

Terrats (French pronunciation: [tɛʁats]) is a commune in the Pyrénées-Orientales department in southern France.

== Geography ==
Terrats is located in the canton of Les Aspres and in the arrondissement of Perpignan.

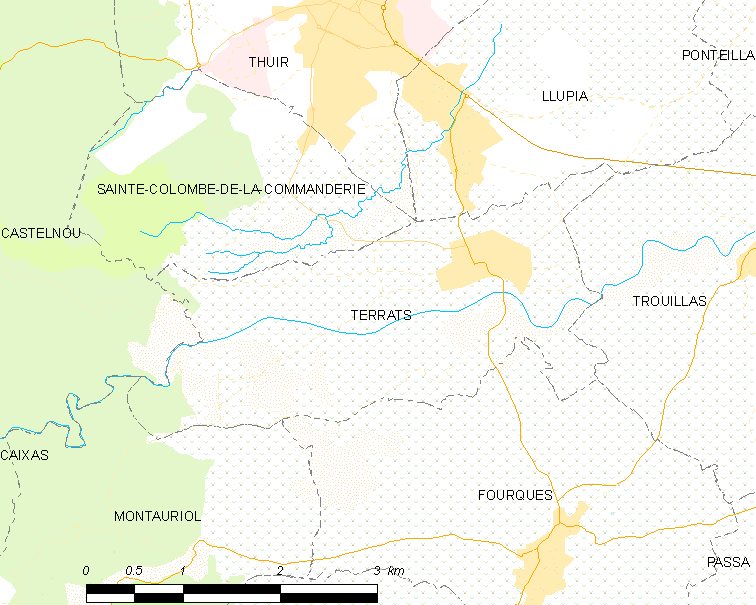
Map of Terrats and its surrounding communes

== Population ==
Historical population
| Year | Pop. | ±% p.a. |
|---|---|---|
| 1968 | 363 | — |
| 1975 | 366 | +0.12% |
| 1982 | 492 | +4.32% |
| 1990 | 520 | +0.69% |
| 1999 | 528 | +0.17% |
| 2007 | 615 | +1.92% |
| 2012 | 668 | +1.67% |
| 2017 | 640 | −0.85% |
| 2023 | 806 | +3.92% |
Source: INSEE

== See also ==
- Communes of the Pyrénées-Orientales department
