= Saint-Jean-Lasseille =

Saint-Jean-Lasseille Sant Joan la Cella
- Commune
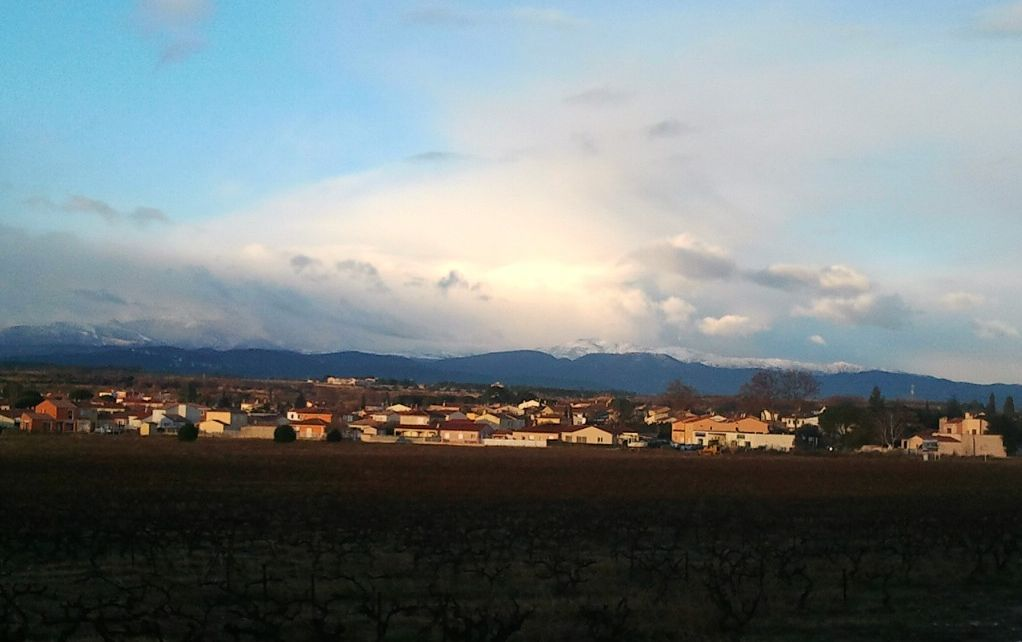
- Saint-Jean-Lasseille

- Coat of arms
- Location of Saint-Jean-Lasseille
- Location within France Location within Occitanie
- Coordinates: 42°34′55″N 2°52′00″E
- Country: France
- Region: Occitania
- Department: Pyrénées-Orientales
- Arrondissement: Céret
- Canton: Les Aspres
- Intercommunality: Aspres

Government
  - Mayor (2020–2026): Philippe Xancho
- Area^{1}: 2.89 km^{2} (1.12 sq mi)
- Elevation: 75 m (246 ft)
- Highest elevation: 103 m (338 ft)
- Lowest elevation: 66 m (217 ft)
- Population (2023): 1,622
  - Density: 561/km^{2} (1,450/sq mi)
- Time zone: UTC+01:00 (CET)
  - Summer (DST): UTC+02:00 (CEST)
- INSEE/Postal code: 66177 /66300
- ^{1} French Land Register data, which excludes lakes, ponds, glaciers > 1 km^{2} (0.386 sq mi or 247 acres) and river estuaries.

Saint-Jean-Lasseille (French pronunciation: [sɛ̃ ʒɑ̃ lasɛj]; Catalan: Sant Joan la Cella) is a commune in the Pyrénées-Orientales department in southern France.

== Geography ==
Saint-Jean-Lasseille is located in the canton of Les Aspres and in the arrondissement of Perpignan.

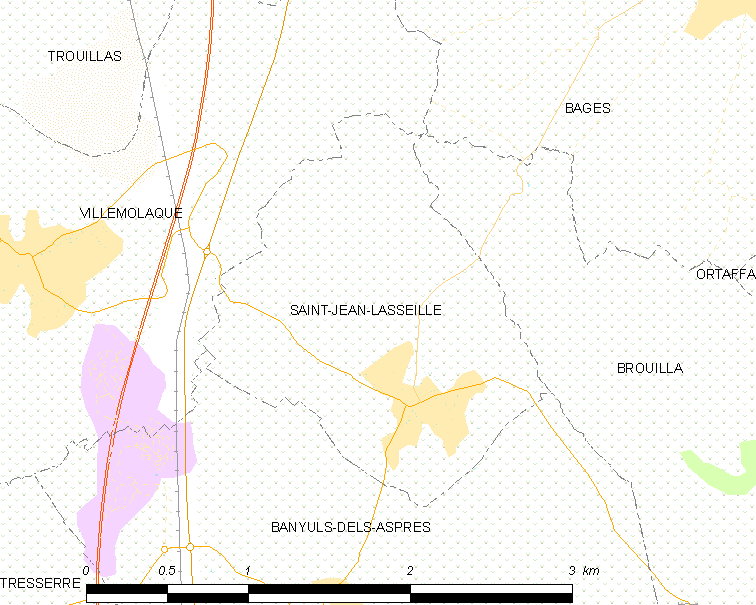
Map of Saint-Jean-Lasseille and its surrounding communes

== Population ==
Historical population
Year	Pop.	±% p.a.
1968	289	—
1975	252	−1.94%
1982	346	+4.63%
1990	437	+2.96%
1999	469	+0.79%
2007	683	+4.81%
2012	1,124	+10.48%
2017	1,540	+6.50%
2023	1,622	+0.87%
Source: INSEE

== See also ==
- Communes of the Pyrénées-Orientales department
