= Sainte-Colombe-de-la-Commanderie =

Sainte-Colombe-de-la-Commanderie Santa Coloma de Tuïr
- Commune
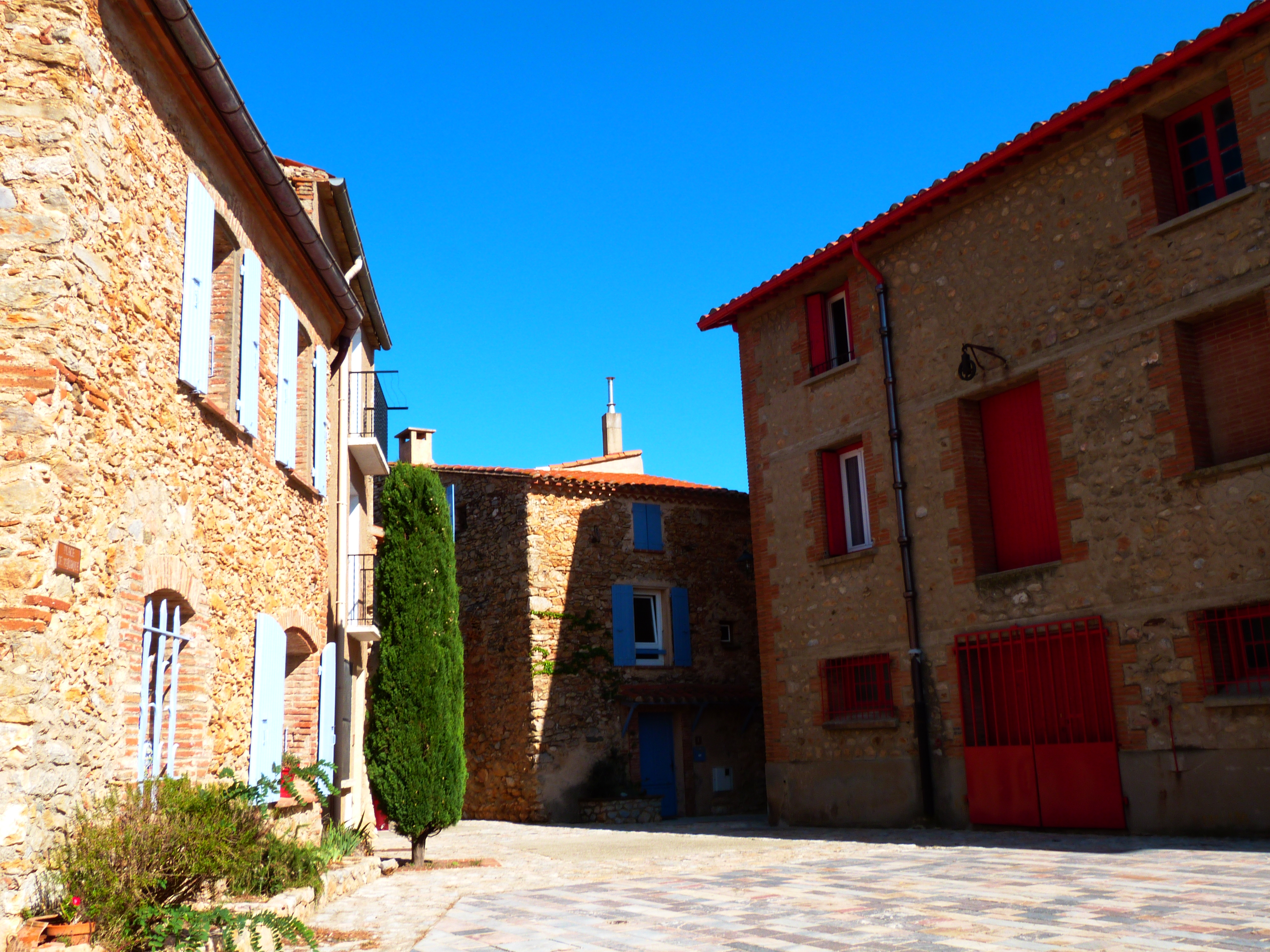
- A square near the church in Sainte-Colombe-de-la-Commanderie
- Location of Sainte-Colombe-de-la-Commanderie
- Location within France Location within Occitanie
- Coordinates: 42°36′56″N 2°44′55″E
- Country: France
- Region: Occitania
- Department: Pyrénées-Orientales
- Arrondissement: Céret
- Canton: Les Aspres
- Intercommunality: Aspres

Government
  - Mayor (2020–2026): Jérôme de Maury
- Area^{1}: 4.74 km^{2} (1.83 sq mi)
- Highest elevation: 32 m (105 ft)
- Lowest elevation: 127 m (417 ft)
- Population (2023): 183
  - Density: 38.6/km^{2} (100/sq mi)
- Time zone: UTC+01:00 (CET)
  - Summer (DST): UTC+02:00 (CEST)
- INSEE/Postal code: 66170 /66300
- ^{1} French Land Register data, which excludes lakes, ponds, glaciers > 1 km^{2} (0.386 sq mi or 247 acres) and river estuaries.

Sainte-Colombe-de-la-Commanderie (French pronunciation: [sɛ̃t kɔlɔ̃b də la kɔmɑ̃dʁi]; Occitan: Senta Colomba de la Comanda; Catalan: Santa Coloma de Tuïr, before 1989: Sainte-Colombe) is a commune in the Pyrénées-Orientales department in southern France.

== Geography ==
Sainte-Colombe-de-la-Commanderie is in the canton of Les Aspres and in the arrondissement of Perpignan.

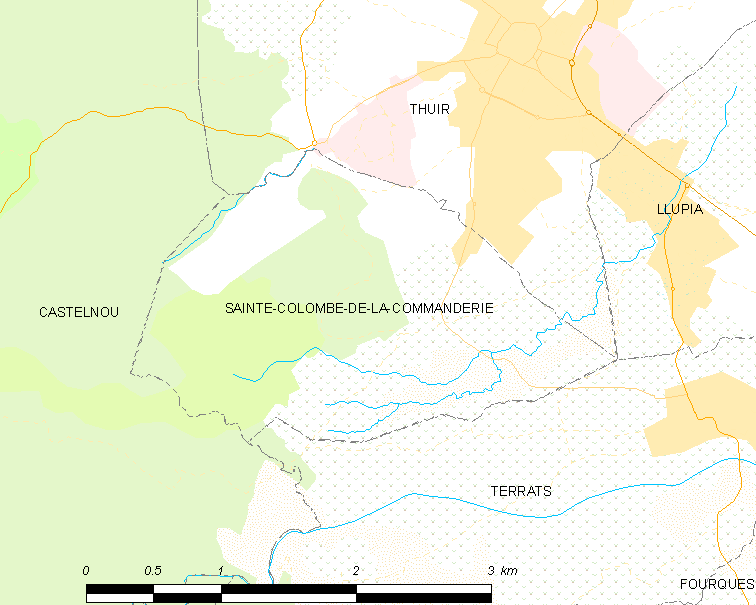
Map of Sainte-Colombe-de-la-Commanderie and its surrounding communes

== Population ==
Historical population
Year	Pop.	±% p.a.
1968	60	—
1975	71	+2.43%
1982	87	+2.95%
1990	83	−0.59%
1999	101	+2.20%
2007	117	+1.86%
2012	140	+3.65%
2017	153	+1.79%
2023	183	+3.03%
Source: INSEE

== See also ==
- Communes of the Pyrénées-Orientales department
