= Fourques, Pyrénées-Orientales =

Fourques Forques
- Commune
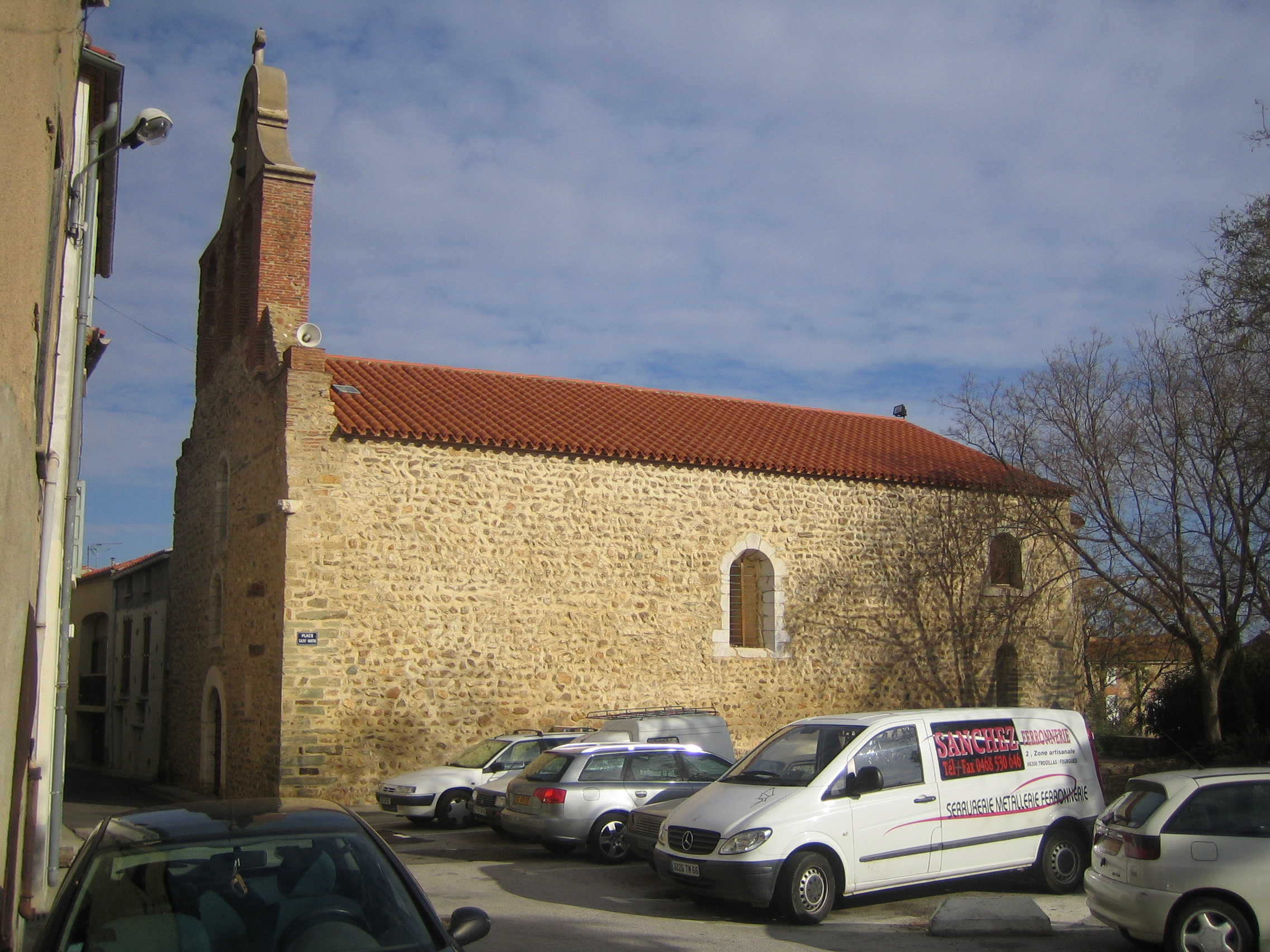
- The church in Fourques

- Coat of arms
- Location of Fourques
- Location within France Location within Occitanie
- Coordinates: 42°34′57″N 2°46′50″E
- Country: France
- Region: Occitania
- Department: Pyrénées-Orientales
- Arrondissement: Céret
- Canton: Les Aspres
- Intercommunality: Aspres

Government
  - Mayor (2020–2026): Fabienne Sevilla
- Area^{1}: 9.39 km^{2} (3.63 sq mi)
- Elevation: 140 m (460 ft)
- Highest elevation: 184 m (604 ft)
- Lowest elevation: 99 m (325 ft)
- Population (2023): 1,347
  - Density: 143/km^{2} (372/sq mi)
- Time zone: UTC+01:00 (CET)
  - Summer (DST): UTC+02:00 (CEST)
- INSEE/Postal code: 66084 /66300
- ^{1} French Land Register data, which excludes lakes, ponds, glaciers > 1 km^{2} (0.386 sq mi or 247 acres) and river estuaries.

Fourques (French pronunciation: [fuʁk]; Catalan: Forques) is a commune in the Pyrénées-Orientales department in southern France.

== Geography ==
Fourques is located in the canton of Les Aspres and in the arrondissement of Perpignan.

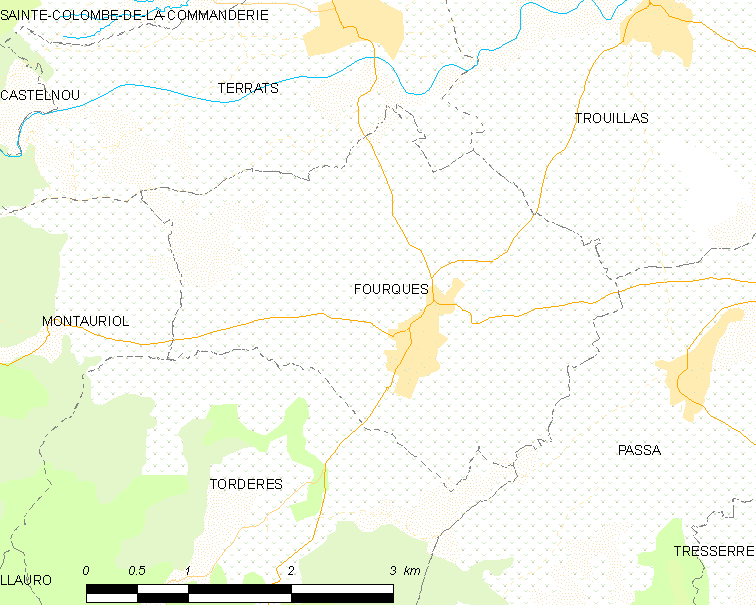
Map of Fourques and its surrounding communes

== Population ==
Historical population
Year	Pop.	±% p.a.
1968	687	—
1975	642	−0.96%
1982	670	+0.61%
1990	673	+0.06%
1999	761	+1.37%
2007	1,003	+3.51%
2012	1,169	+3.11%
2017	1,280	+1.83%
2023	1,347	+0.85%
Source: INSEE

== See also ==
- Communes of the Pyrénées-Orientales department
