= Trouillas =

Trouillas Trullars
- Commune
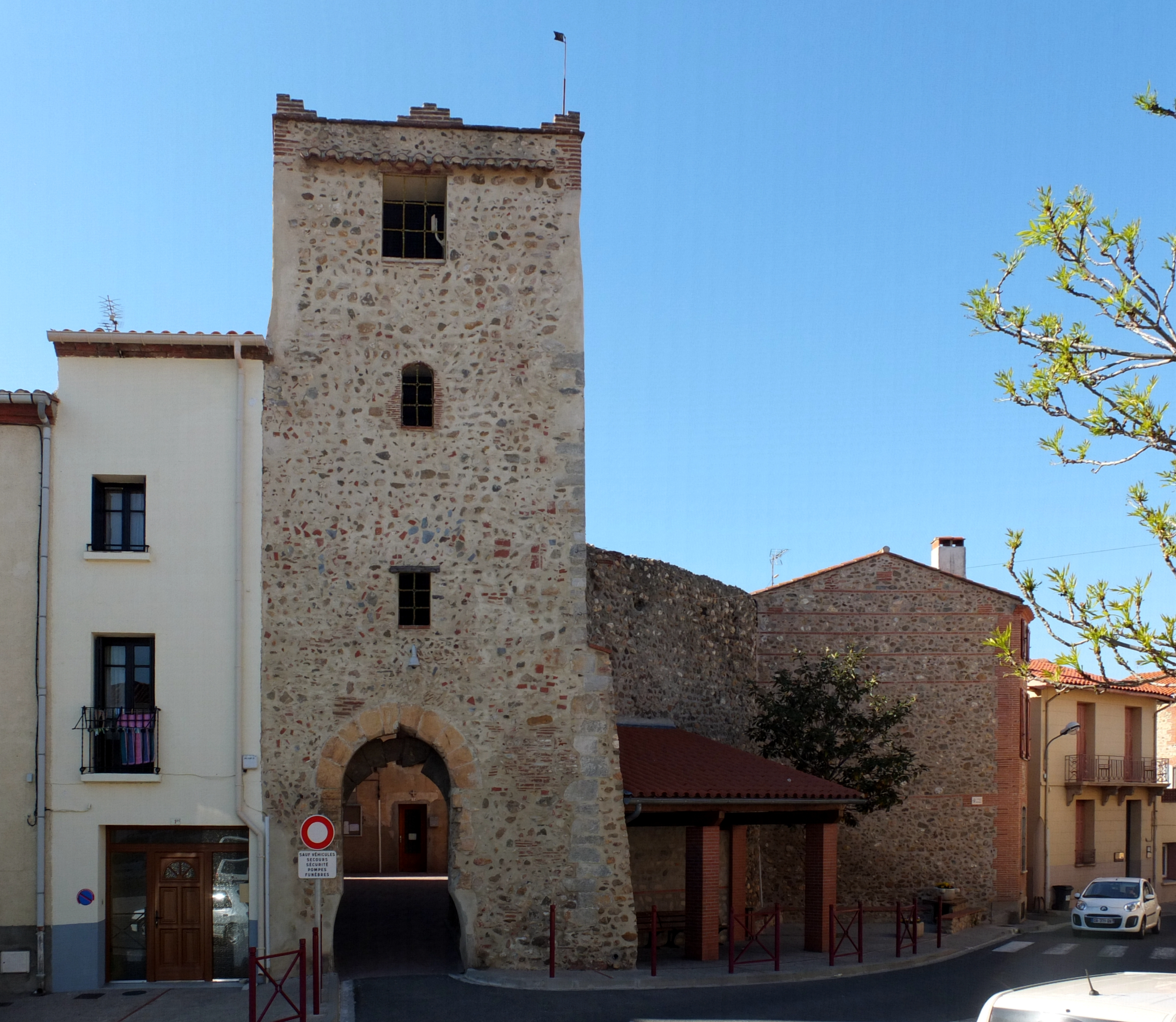
- Town center of Trouillas

- Coat of arms
- Location of Trouillas
- Location within France Location within Occitanie
- Coordinates: 42°36′45″N 2°48′33″E
- Country: France
- Region: Occitania
- Department: Pyrénées-Orientales
- Arrondissement: Céret
- Canton: Les Aspres
- Intercommunality: Aspres

Government
  - Mayor (2020–2026): Rémy Attard
- Area^{1}: 17.01 km^{2} (6.57 sq mi)
- Elevation: 77 m (253 ft)
- Highest elevation: 152 m (499 ft)
- Lowest elevation: 58 m (190 ft)
- Population (2023): 2,324
  - Density: 136.6/km^{2} (353.9/sq mi)
- Time zone: UTC+01:00 (CET)
  - Summer (DST): UTC+02:00 (CEST)
- INSEE/Postal code: 66217 /66300
- ^{1} French Land Register data, which excludes lakes, ponds, glaciers > 1 km^{2} (0.386 sq mi or 247 acres) and river estuaries.

Trouillas (French pronunciation: [tʁujas]; Catalan: Trullars) is a commune in the Pyrénées-Orientales department in southern France.

== Geography ==
Trouillas is located in the canton of Les Aspres and in the arrondissement of Perpignan.

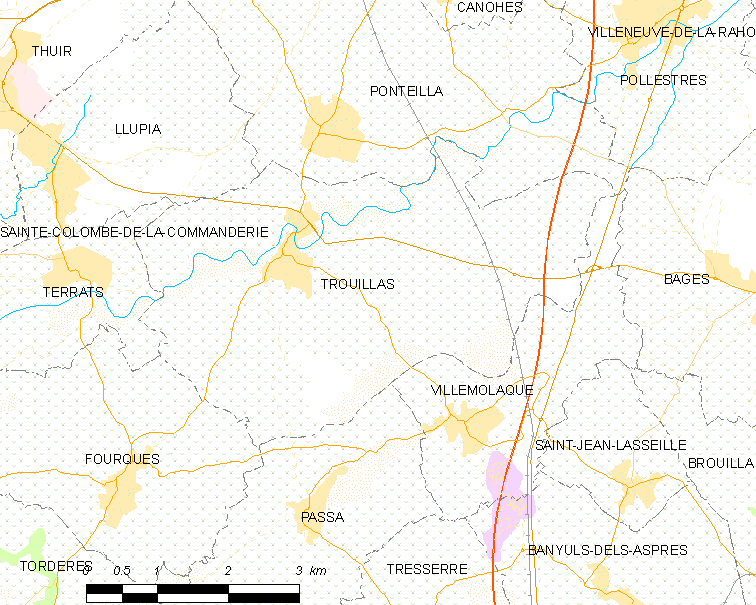
Map of Trouillas and its surrounding communes

== Population ==
Historical population
Year	Pop.	±% p.a.
1968	1,073	—
1975	1,070	−0.04%
1982	1,144	+0.96%
1990	1,272	+1.33%
1999	1,424	+1.26%
2007	1,554	+1.10%
2012	1,875	+3.83%
2017	2,067	+1.97%
2023	2,324	+1.97%
Source: INSEE

== See also ==
- Communes of the Pyrénées-Orientales department
