= Oms, Pyrénées-Orientales =

Oms
- Commune
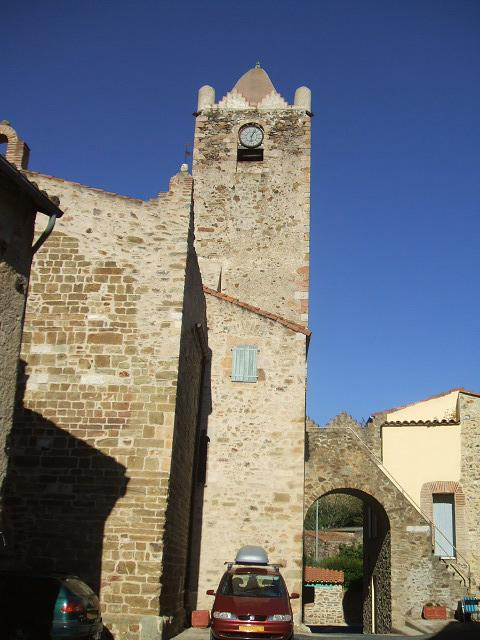
- The parish church of Saint-Jean, in Oms

- Coat of arms
- Location of Oms
- Location within France Location within Occitanie
- Coordinates: 42°32′42″N 2°41′49″E
- Country: France
- Region: Occitania
- Department: Pyrénées-Orientales
- Arrondissement: Céret
- Canton: Les Aspres
- Intercommunality: Aspres

Government
  - Mayor (2020–2026): Patrick Gericault
- Area^{1}: 18.53 km^{2} (7.15 sq mi)
- Elevation: 496 m (1,627 ft)
- Highest elevation: 611 m (2,005 ft)
- Lowest elevation: 180 m (590 ft)
- Population (2023): 364
  - Density: 19.6/km^{2} (50.9/sq mi)
- Time zone: UTC+01:00 (CET)
  - Summer (DST): UTC+02:00 (CEST)
- INSEE/Postal code: 66126 /66400
- ^{1} French Land Register data, which excludes lakes, ponds, glaciers > 1 km^{2} (0.386 sq mi or 247 acres) and river estuaries.

Oms (French pronunciation: [ɔms]; Catalan: Oms) is a commune in the Pyrénées-Orientales department in southern France.

== Geography ==
Oms is located in the canton of Les Aspres and in the arrondissement of Céret.

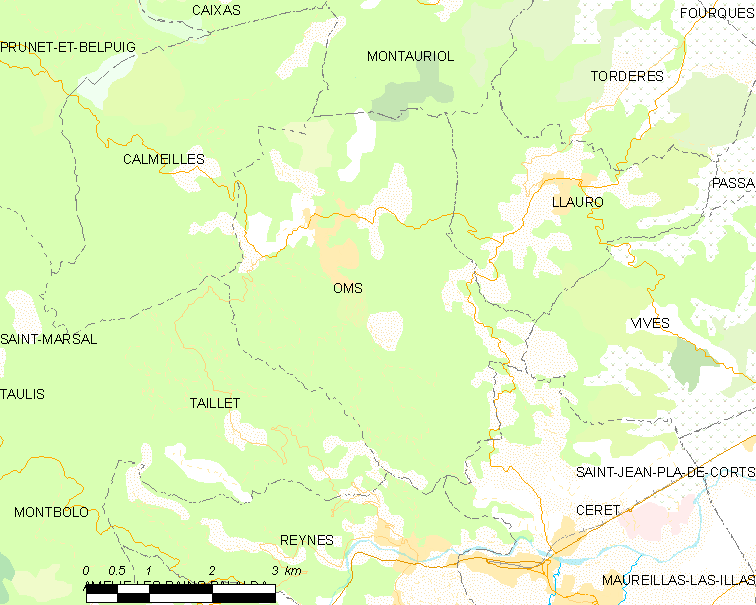
Map of Oms and its surrounding communes

== Population ==
Historical population
Year	Pop.	±% p.a.
1968	160	—
1975	165	+0.44%
1982	225	+4.53%
1990	228	+0.17%
1999	268	+1.81%
2007	275	+0.32%
2012	326	+3.46%
2017	333	+0.43%
2023	364	+1.49%
Source: INSEE

== See also ==
- Communes of the Pyrénées-Orientales department
