= Tresserre =

Tresserre Trasserra
- Commune
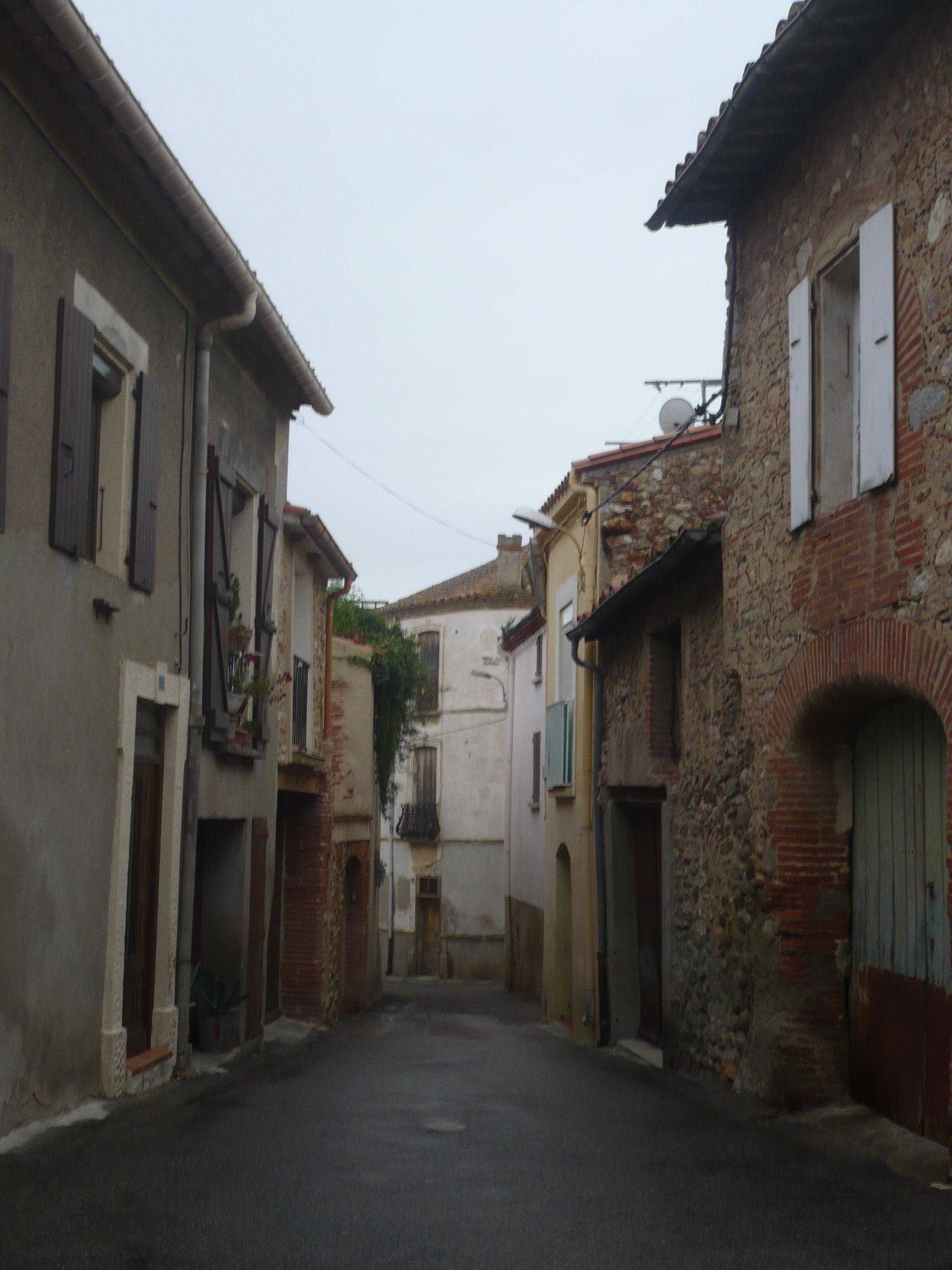
- The church road in Tresserre
- Location of Tresserre
- Location within France Location within Occitanie
- Coordinates: 42°33′50″N 2°49′51″E
- Country: France
- Region: Occitania
- Department: Pyrénées-Orientales
- Arrondissement: Céret
- Canton: Les Aspres
- Intercommunality: Aspres

Government
  - Mayor (2020–2026): Michel Thiriet
- Area^{1}: 11.21 km^{2} (4.33 sq mi)
- Elevation: 152 m (499 ft)
- Highest elevation: 196 m (643 ft)
- Lowest elevation: 48 m (157 ft)
- Population (2023): 1,166
  - Density: 104.0/km^{2} (269.4/sq mi)
- Time zone: UTC+01:00 (CET)
  - Summer (DST): UTC+02:00 (CEST)
- INSEE/Postal code: 66214 /66300
- ^{1} French Land Register data, which excludes lakes, ponds, glaciers > 1 km^{2} (0.386 sq mi or 247 acres) and river estuaries.

Tresserre (French pronunciation: [tʁɛsɛʁ]; Occitan: Tresserra; Catalan: Trasserra) is a commune in the Pyrénées-Orientales department in southern France.

== Geography ==
Tresserre is located in the canton of Les Aspres and in the arrondissement of Perpignan.

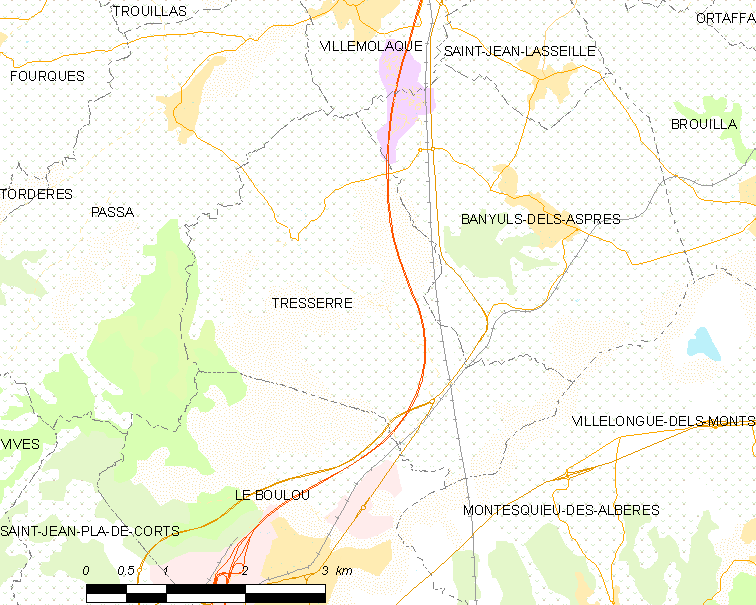
Map of Tresserre and its surrounding communes

== Demography ==
Historical population
Year	Pop.	±% p.a.
1968	392	—
1975	335	−2.22%
1982	379	+1.78%
1990	503	+3.60%
1999	637	+2.66%
2007	753	+2.11%
2012	918	+4.04%
2017	1,066	+3.03%
2023	1,166	+1.51%
Source: INSEE

== Sites of interest ==
- The Saint-Saturnin church, partly romanesque.
- The Saint-Étienne de Nidolères church, romanesque but in ruins.

== See also ==
- Communes of the Pyrénées-Orientales department
