= Reynès =

Reynès Reiners
- Commune
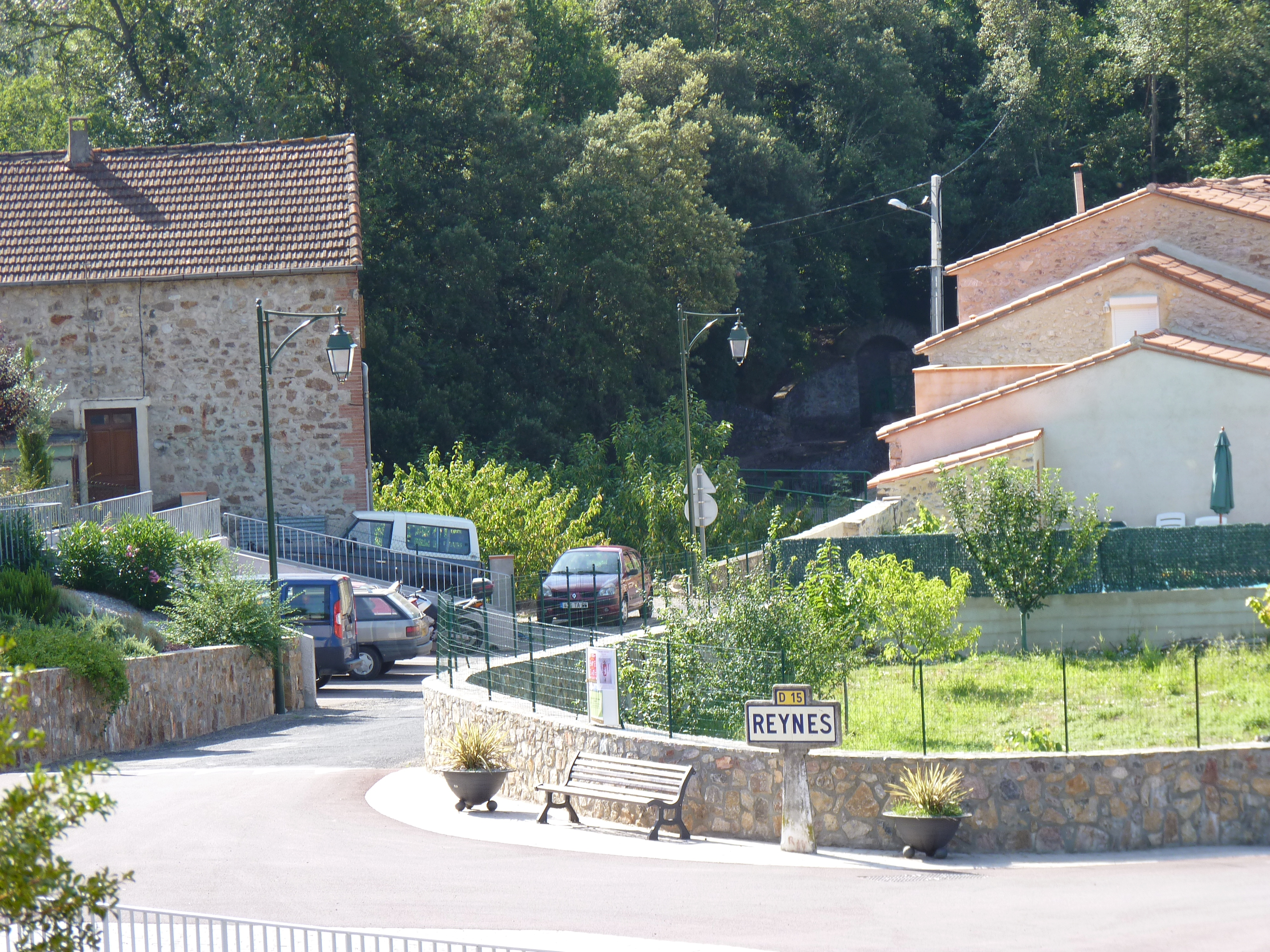
- A view within Reynès
- Location of Reynès
- Location within France Location within Occitanie
- Coordinates: 42°28′34″N 2°42′32″E
- Country: France
- Region: Occitania
- Department: Pyrénées-Orientales
- Arrondissement: Céret
- Canton: Le Canigou
- Intercommunality: Vallespir

Government
  - Mayor (2020–2026): Guy Gatounes
- Area^{1}: 27.56 km^{2} (10.64 sq mi)
- Elevation: 380 m (1,250 ft)
- Highest elevation: 1,440 m (4,720 ft)
- Lowest elevation: 132 m (433 ft)
- Population (2023): 1,220
  - Density: 44.3/km^{2} (115/sq mi)
- Time zone: UTC+01:00 (CET)
  - Summer (DST): UTC+02:00 (CEST)
- INSEE/Postal code: 66160 /66400
- ^{1} French Land Register data, which excludes lakes, ponds, glaciers > 1 km^{2} (0.386 sq mi or 247 acres) and river estuaries.

Reynès (French pronunciation: [ʁɛnɛs]; Catalan: Reiners) is a commune in the Pyrénées-Orientales department in southern France.

== Geography ==
Reynès is in the canton of Le Canigou and in the arrondissement of Céret.

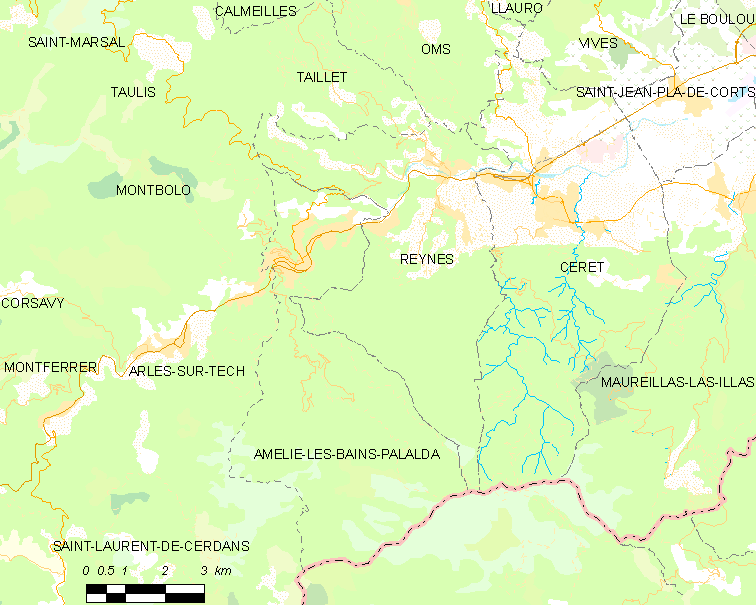
Map of Reynès and its surrounding communes

== Population ==
Historical population
Year	Pop.	±% p.a.
1968	676	—
1975	692	+0.33%
1982	787	+1.85%
1990	964	+2.57%
1999	1,203	+2.49%
2007	1,248	+0.46%
2012	1,246	−0.03%
2017	1,328	+1.28%
2023	1,220	−1.40%
Source: INSEE

== Talc ==
Reynès was home to a very productive talc mine which operated from 1876 to 1987. The extracted talc was used in various industries: soap making in Marseilles, porcelain making in Limoges and leather curing. In 1929 the mine installed an aerial wire system to facilitate the transportation of wagons down into the deep valley. In 1930, 440 tons of talc were extracted from the mine.

== See also ==
- Communes of the Pyrénées-Orientales department
