= Brouilla =

Brouilla Brullà (Catalan)
- Commune
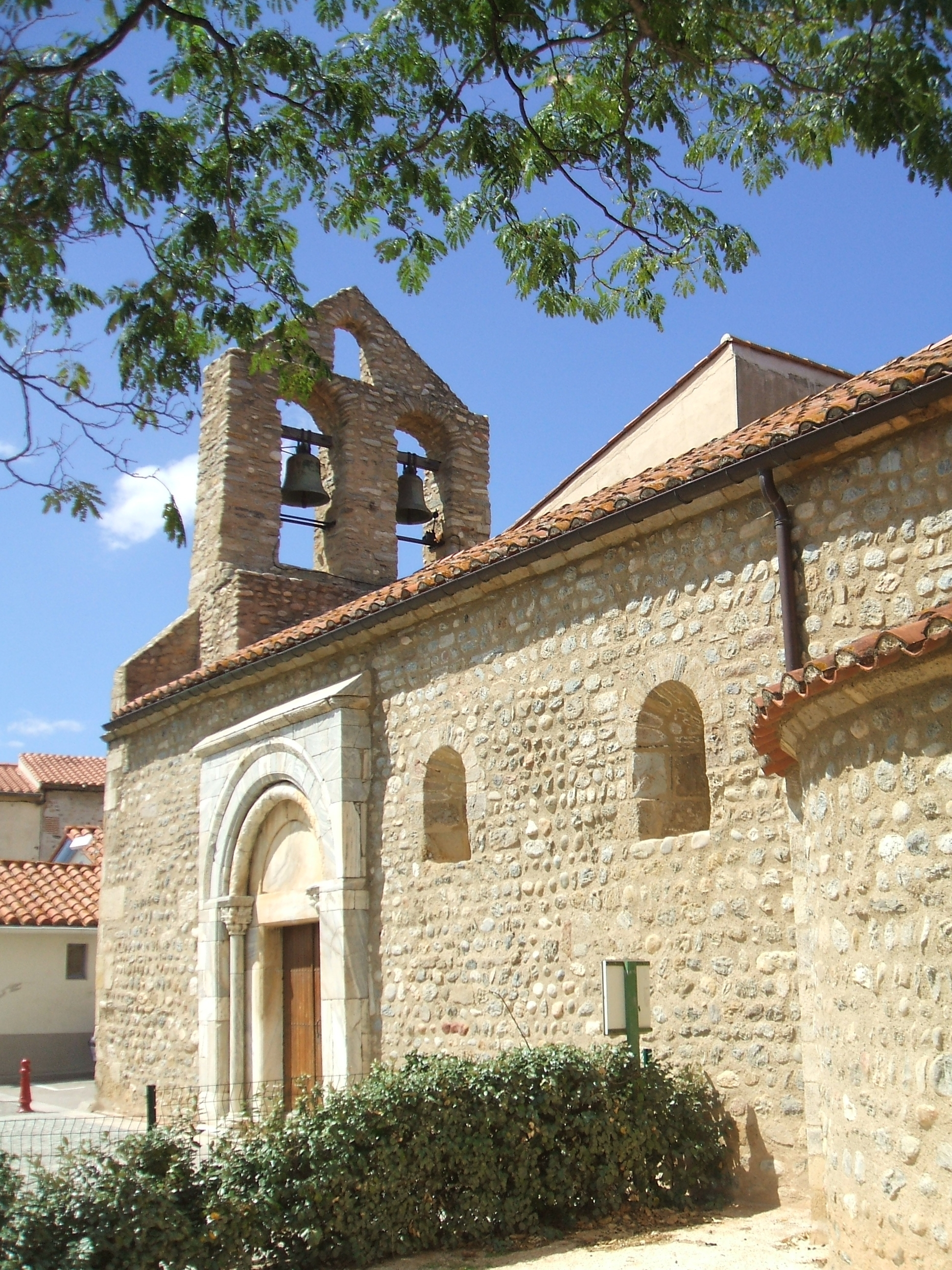
- The church of Sainte-Marie, in Brouilla
- Location of Brouilla
- Location within France Location within Occitanie
- Coordinates: 42°34′03″N 2°54′16″E
- Country: France
- Region: Occitania
- Department: Pyrénées-Orientales
- Arrondissement: Céret
- Canton: Les Aspres
- Intercommunality: Aspres

Government
  - Mayor (2020–2026): Pierre Taurinya
- Area^{1}: 7.83 km^{2} (3.02 sq mi)
- Elevation: 46 m (151 ft)
- Highest elevation: 108 m (354 ft)
- Lowest elevation: 27 m (89 ft)
- Population (2023): 1,572
  - Density: 201/km^{2} (520/sq mi)
- Demonym: brullanenc (ca)
- Time zone: UTC+01:00 (CET)
  - Summer (DST): UTC+02:00 (CEST)
- INSEE/Postal code: 66026 /66620
- ^{1} French Land Register data, which excludes lakes, ponds, glaciers > 1 km^{2} (0.386 sq mi or 247 acres) and river estuaries.

Brouilla (French pronunciation: [bʁuja]; Catalan: Brullà [bɾuˈʎa]) is a commune in the Pyrénées-Orientales department in southern France.

== Geography ==
=== Localisation ===
Brouilla is located in the canton of Les Aspres and in the arrondissement of Perpignan.

It is part of the Northern Catalan comarca of Rosselló.

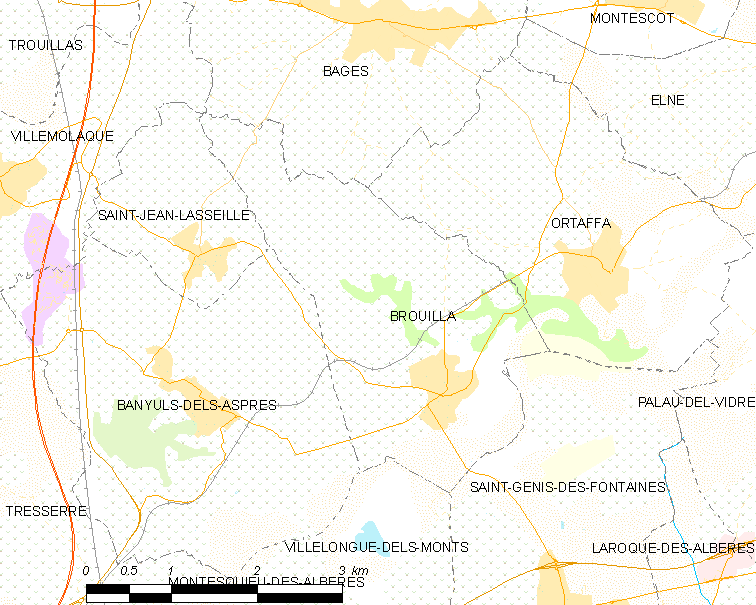
Map of Brouilla and its surrounding communes

== Government and politics ==
=== Mayors ===
Mayor	Term start	Term end
François Nègre	1959	1971
Michel Capdet	1971	1991
Roger Parada	1991	1995
Pierre Taurinya	1995	

== Population ==
Historical population
Year	Pop.	±% p.a.
1968	537	—
1975	564	+0.70%
1982	616	+1.27%
1990	565	−1.07%
1999	630	+1.22%
2007	990	+5.81%
2012	1,155	+3.13%
2017	1,437	+4.47%
2023	1,572	+1.51%
Source: INSEE

== See also ==
- Communes of the Pyrénées-Orientales department
