= Thuir =

Thuir Tuïr
- Commune
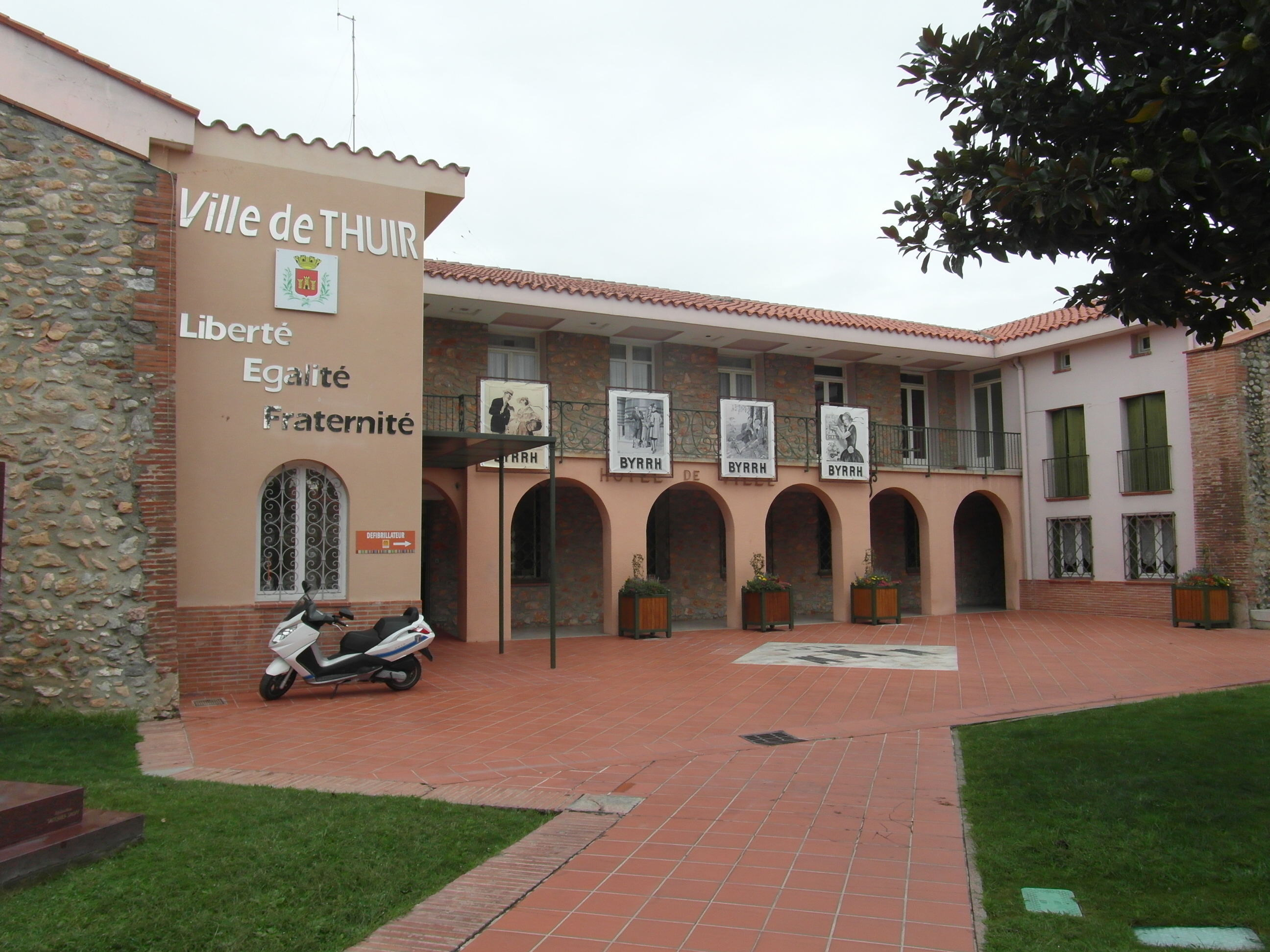
- The town hall in Thuir

- Coat of arms
- Location of Thuir
- Location within France Location within Occitanie
- Coordinates: 42°37′59″N 2°45′26″E
- Country: France
- Region: Occitania
- Department: Pyrénées-Orientales
- Arrondissement: Céret
- Canton: Les Aspres
- Intercommunality: Aspres

Government
  - Mayor (2020–2026): René Olive
- Area^{1}: 19.90 km^{2} (7.68 sq mi)
- Elevation: 99 m (325 ft)
- Highest elevation: 243 m (797 ft)
- Lowest elevation: 78 m (256 ft)
- Population (2023): 8,243
  - Density: 414.2/km^{2} (1,073/sq mi)
- Time zone: UTC+01:00 (CET)
  - Summer (DST): UTC+02:00 (CEST)
- INSEE/Postal code: 66210 /66300
- ^{1} French Land Register data, which excludes lakes, ponds, glaciers > 1 km^{2} (0.386 sq mi or 247 acres) and river estuaries.

Thuir (French pronunciation: [tɥiʁ]; Catalan: Tuïr, [tuˈi]) is a commune in the Pyrénées-Orientales department, southern France.

== Geography ==
Thuir is located southwest of Perpignan, in the canton of Les Aspres and in the arrondissement of Ceret. It is situated in a plain between the natural zones of the Aspres and the Riberal.

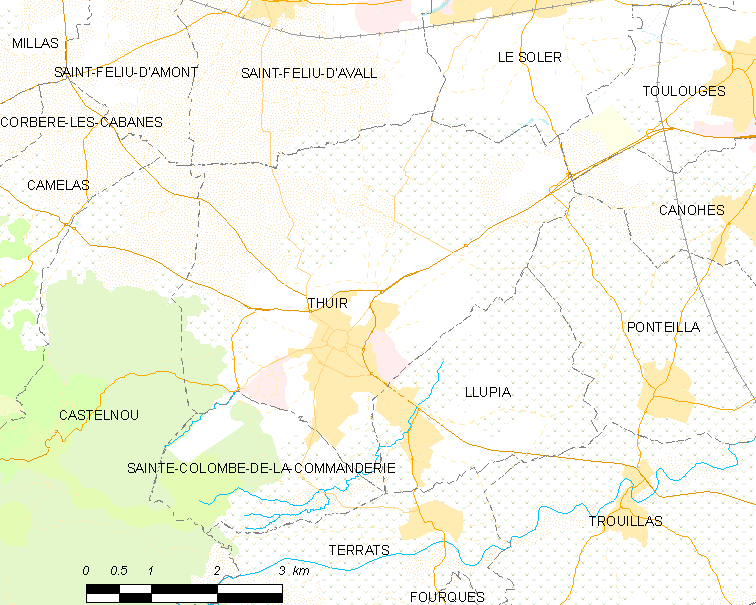
Map of Thuir and its surrounding communes

== Population ==
Historical population
Year	Pop.	±% p.a.
1968	4,192	—
1975	6,023	+5.31%
1982	6,356	+0.77%
1990	6,638	+0.54%
1999	7,257	+1.00%
2007	7,415	+0.27%
2012	7,189	−0.62%
2017	7,635	+1.21%
2023	8,243	+1.29%
Source: INSEE

== See also ==
- Communes of the Pyrénées-Orientales department
