= Llauro =

Llauro Llauró
- Commune
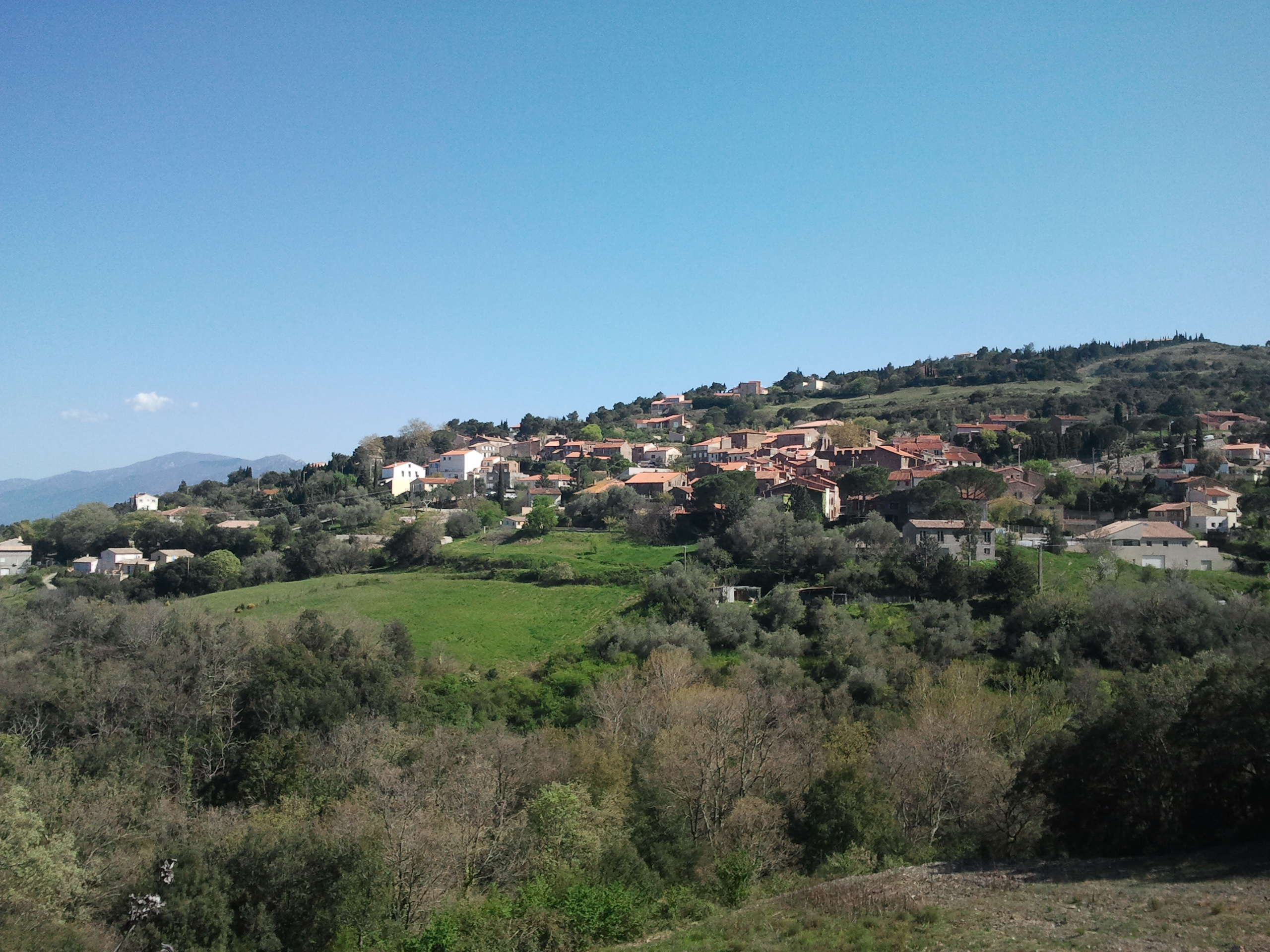
- Llauro

- Coat of arms
- Location of Llauro
- Location within France Location within Occitanie
- Coordinates: 42°33′02″N 2°44′40″E
- Country: France
- Region: Occitania
- Department: Pyrénées-Orientales
- Arrondissement: Céret
- Canton: Les Aspres
- Intercommunality: Aspres

Government
  - Mayor (2020–2026): Alain Bézian
- Area^{1}: 8.34 km^{2} (3.22 sq mi)
- Elevation: 138 m (453 ft)
- Highest elevation: 511 m (1,677 ft)
- Lowest elevation: 174 m (571 ft)
- Population (2023): 311
  - Density: 37.3/km^{2} (96.6/sq mi)
- Time zone: UTC+01:00 (CET)
  - Summer (DST): UTC+02:00 (CEST)
- INSEE/Postal code: 66099 /66300
- ^{1} French Land Register data, which excludes lakes, ponds, glaciers > 1 km^{2} (0.386 sq mi or 247 acres) and river estuaries.

Llauro (French pronunciation: [joʁo]; Catalan: Llauró) is a commune in the Pyrénées-Orientales department in southern France.

== Geography ==
Llauro is located in the canton of Les Aspres and in the arrondissement of Perpignan.

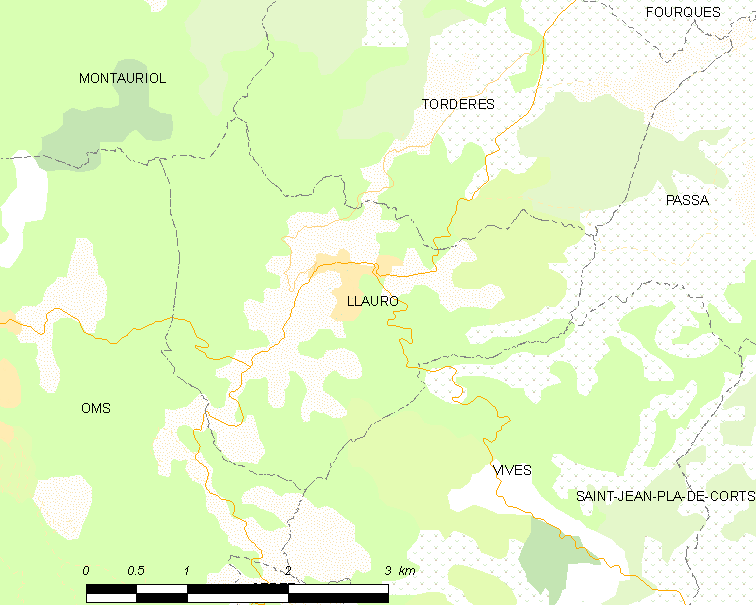
Map of Llauro and its surrounding communes

== Population ==
Historical population
| Year | Pop. | ±% p.a. |
|---|---|---|
| 1968 | 205 | — |
| 1975 | 198 | −0.50% |
| 1982 | 236 | +2.54% |
| 1990 | 255 | +0.97% |
| 1999 | 270 | +0.64% |
| 2007 | 322 | +2.23% |
| 2012 | 316 | −0.38% |
| 2017 | 317 | +0.06% |
| 2023 | 311 | −0.32% |
Source: INSEE

== Sites of interest ==
- Saint Martin church

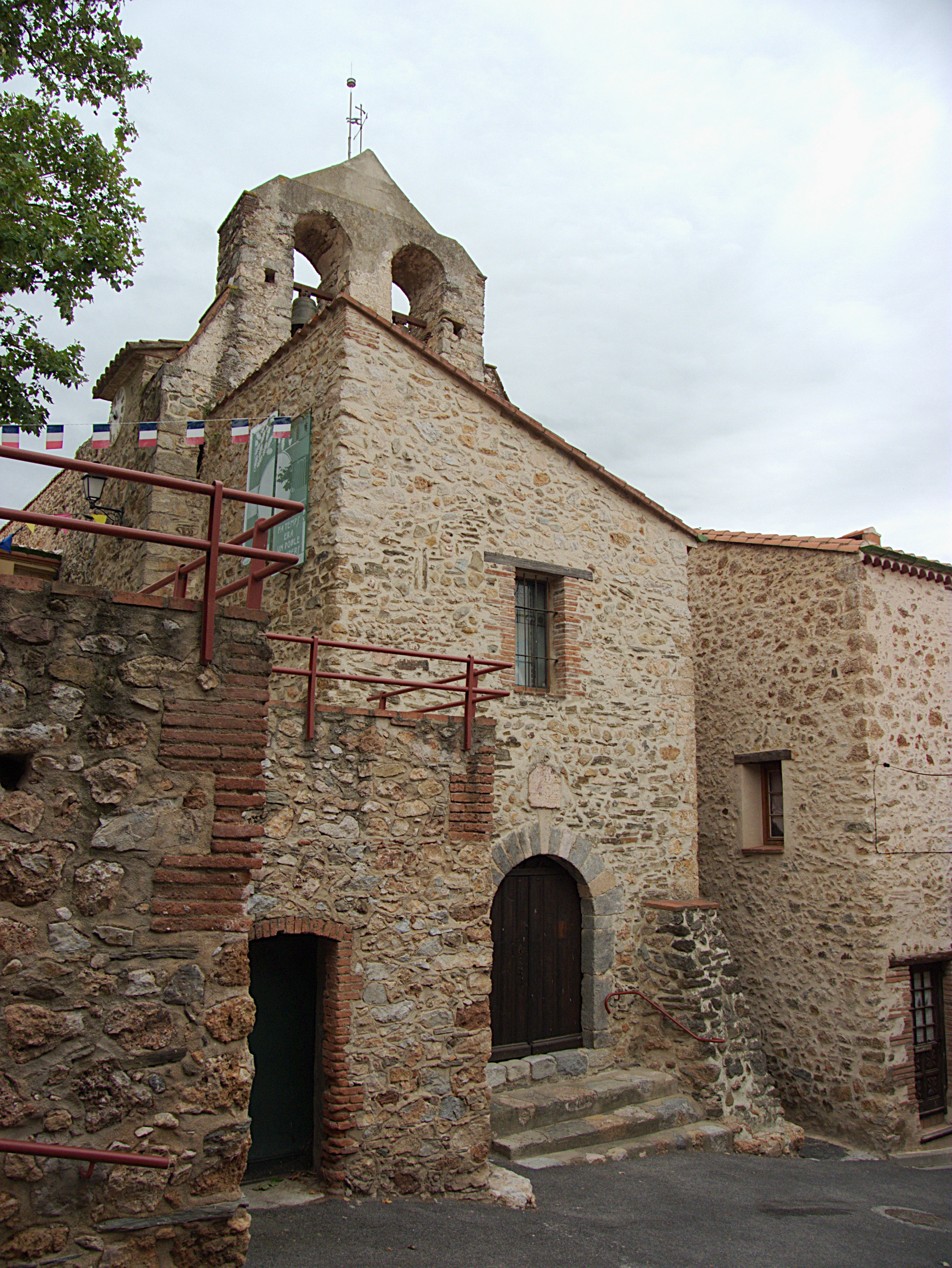
Saint Martin church

== See also ==
- Communes of the Pyrénées-Orientales department
