= Montauriol, Pyrénées-Orientales =

Montauriol Montoriol
- Commune
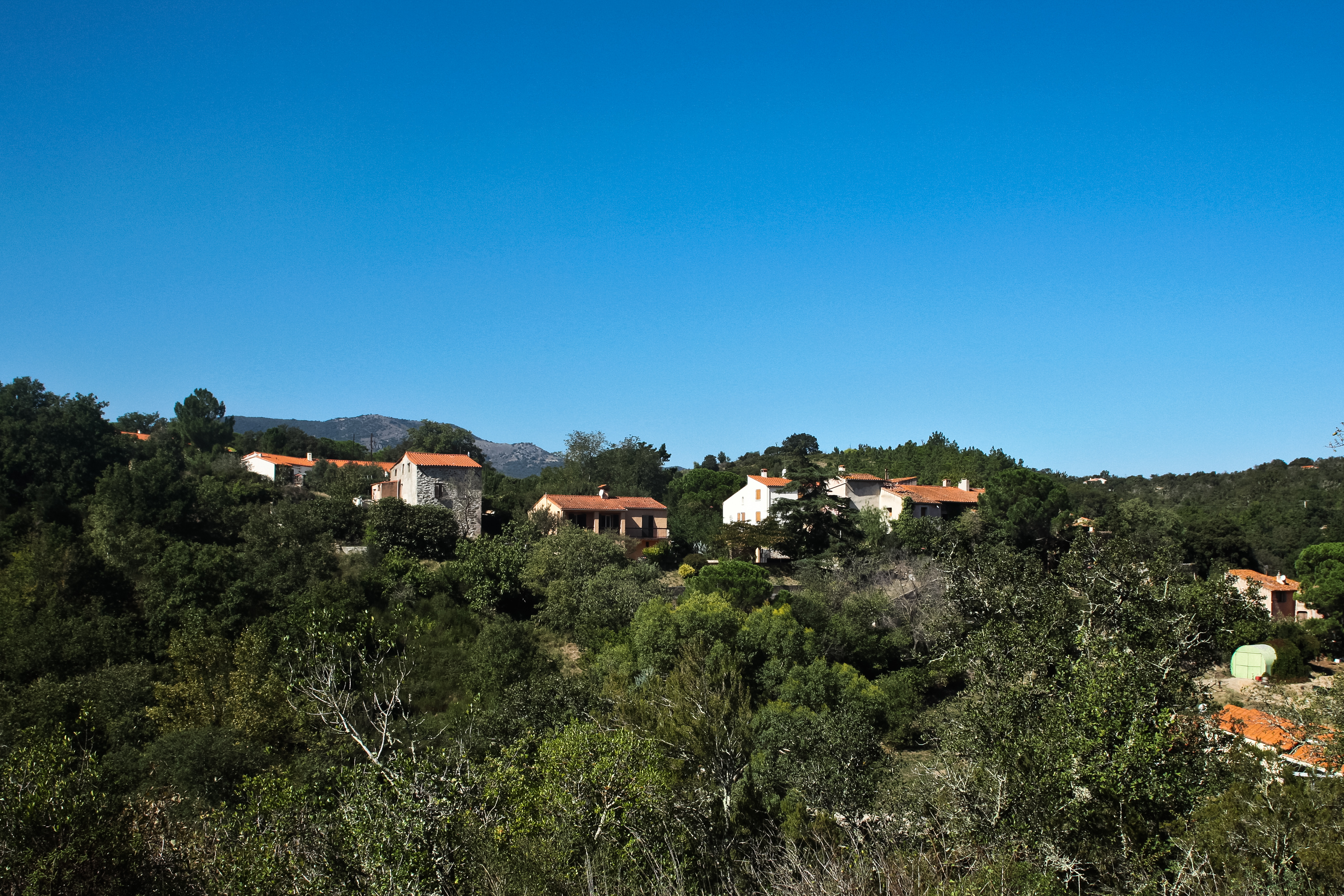
- The village of Montauriol, seen from the church of Saint-Saturnin
- Location of Montauriol
- Location within France Location within Occitanie
- Coordinates: 42°34′36″N 2°43′31″E
- Country: France
- Region: Occitania
- Department: Pyrénées-Orientales
- Arrondissement: Céret
- Canton: Les Aspres
- Intercommunality: Aspres

Government
  - Mayor (2020–2026): Patrick Mauran
- Area^{1}: 11.10 km^{2} (4.29 sq mi)
- Elevation: 244 m (801 ft)
- Highest elevation: 463 m (1,519 ft)
- Lowest elevation: 149 m (489 ft)
- Population (2023): 254
  - Density: 22.9/km^{2} (59.3/sq mi)
- Time zone: UTC+01:00 (CET)
  - Summer (DST): UTC+02:00 (CEST)
- INSEE/Postal code: 66112 /66300
- ^{1} French Land Register data, which excludes lakes, ponds, glaciers > 1 km^{2} (0.386 sq mi or 247 acres) and river estuaries.

Montauriol (French pronunciation: [mɔ̃toʁjɔl]; Catalan: Montoriol) is a commune in the Pyrénées-Orientales department in southern France.

== Geography ==
Montauriol is located in the canton of Les Aspres and in the arrondissement of Céret.

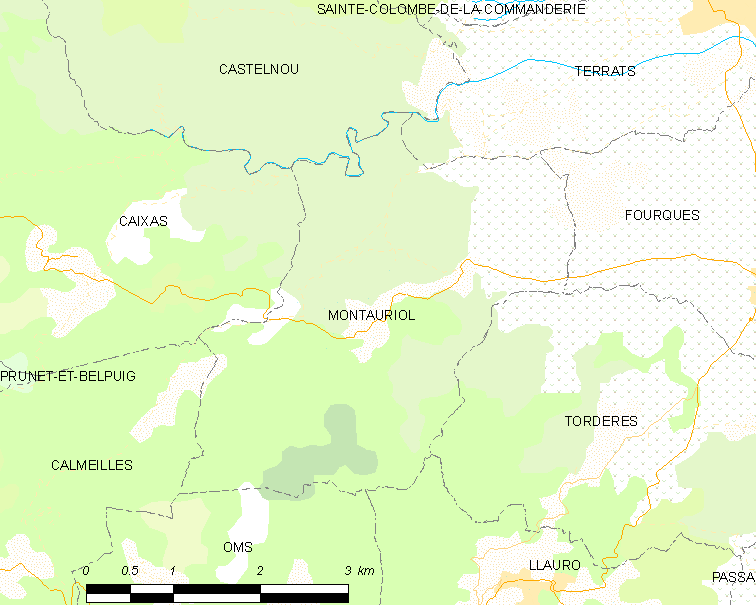
Map of Montauriol and its surrounding communes

== Population ==
Historical population
Year	Pop.	±% p.a.
1968	78	—
1975	90	+2.07%
1982	125	+4.80%
1990	165	+3.53%
1999	188	+1.46%
2007	212	+1.51%
2012	208	−0.38%
2017	247	+3.50%
2023	254	+0.47%
Source: INSEE

== See also ==
- Communes of the Pyrénées-Orientales department
