= Passa, Pyrénées-Orientales =

Passa Paçà
- Commune
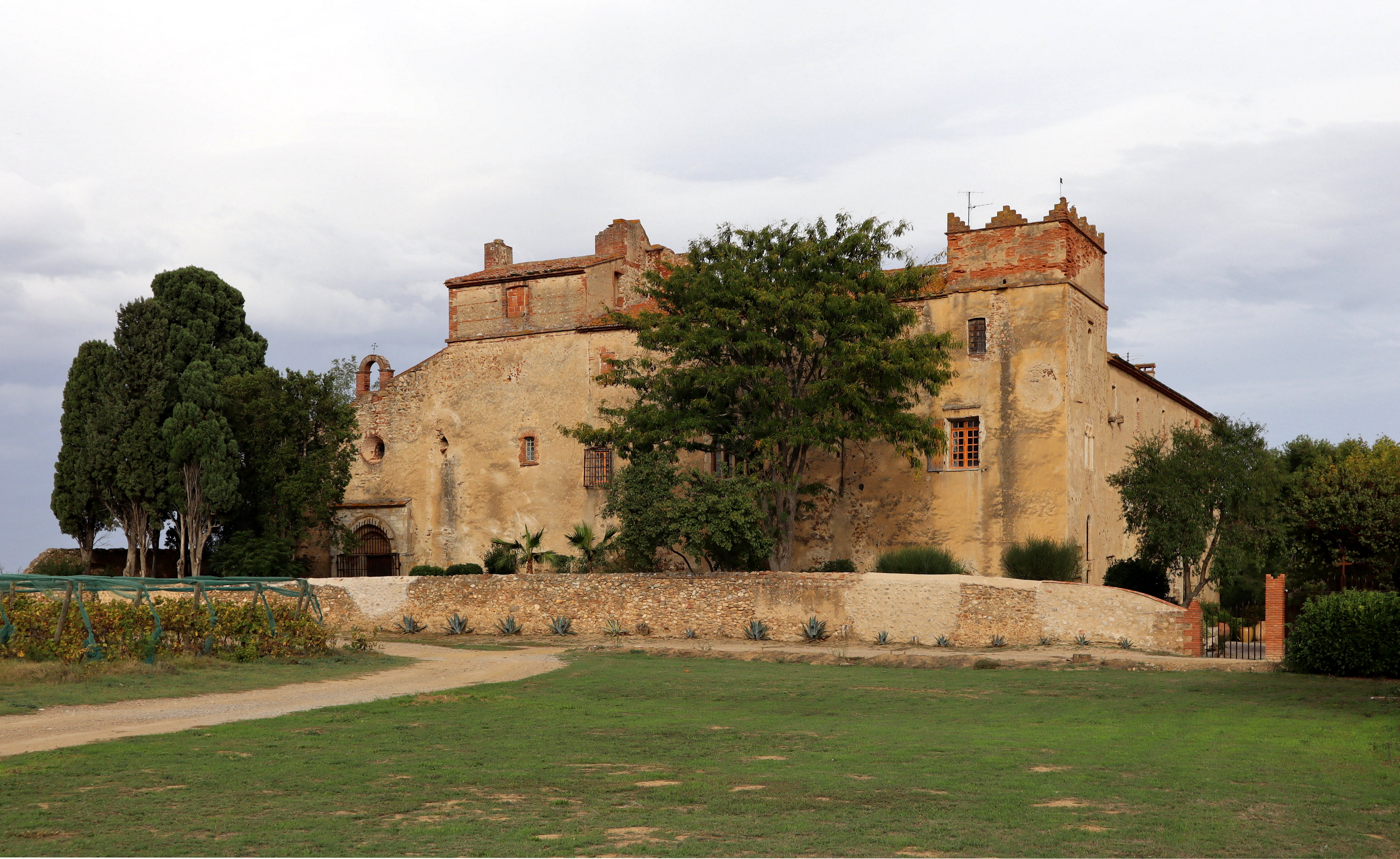
- The Monastir del Camp, in Passa

- Coat of arms
- Location of Passa
- Location within France Location within Occitanie
- Coordinates: 42°34′44″N 2°48′44″E
- Country: France
- Region: Occitania
- Department: Pyrénées-Orientales
- Arrondissement: Céret
- Canton: Les Aspres
- Intercommunality: Aspres

Government
  - Mayor (2020–2026): Patrick Bellegarde
- Area^{1}: 13.47 km^{2} (5.20 sq mi)
- Elevation: 138 m (453 ft)
- Highest elevation: 204 m (669 ft)
- Lowest elevation: 85 m (279 ft)
- Population (2023): 1,118
  - Density: 83.00/km^{2} (215.0/sq mi)
- Time zone: UTC+01:00 (CET)
  - Summer (DST): UTC+02:00 (CEST)
- INSEE/Postal code: 66134 /66300
- ^{1} French Land Register data, which excludes lakes, ponds, glaciers > 1 km^{2} (0.386 sq mi or 247 acres) and river estuaries.

Passa (French pronunciation: [pasa]; Occitan: Despensat; Catalan: Paçà) is a commune in the Pyrénées-Orientales department in southern France.

== Geography ==
Passa is located in the canton of Les Aspres and in the arrondissement of Perpignan.

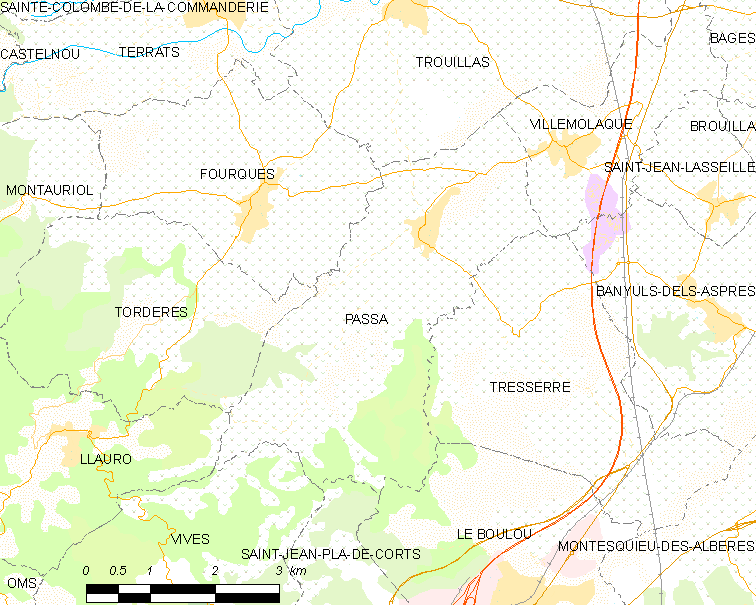
Map of Passa and its surrounding communes

== Population ==
Historical population
Year	Pop.	±% p.a.
1968	468	—
1975	406	−2.01%
1982	435	+0.99%
1990	487	+1.42%
1999	569	+1.74%
2007	685	+2.35%
2012	693	+0.23%
2017	820	+3.42%
2023	1,118	+5.30%
Source: INSEE

== See also ==
- Communes of the Pyrénées-Orientales department
