= Véraza (disambiguation) =

Véraza may refer to:

- Véraza commune in Aude department, France
- Véraza culture, archaeological culture (local development of the Chasséen culture), dated appr. 3400/3300 and 2700/2600 BC and named after the aforesaid commune.
