= Seine–Oise–Marne culture =

- Geographical range: France
- Period: Neolithic
- Dates: 3100–2000 BC
- Preceded by: Chasséen culture
- Followed by: Bell Beaker culture
- Defined by: Pere Bosch-Gimpera

The Seine–Oise–Marne or SOM culture is the name given by archaeologists to the final culture of the Neolithic and first culture of the Chalcolithic in northern France and southern Belgium.

It lasted from around 3100 to 2000 BCE and is most famous for its gallery grave megalithic tombs, which incorporate a port-hole slab separating the entrance from the main burial chamber. In the chalk valley of the River Marne, rock-cut tombs (hypogea) were dug to a similar design. Some have examples of megalithic art with images of axes, breasts, and necklaces carved on their walls.

Diagnostic artefacts include transverse arrowheads, antler sleeves and crude, flat-based cylindrical and bucket-shaped pottery decorated with appliqué cordons. The SOM culture had trade links with neighbouring cultures enabling the use of Callaïs and Grand Pressingy flint imported from Brittany and the Loire and later, the use of copper.

The culture seems to have had strong links with other areas and may have arisen from a composite of influences as indicated by the gallery grave design common across Europe and the pottery types which have comparators in Western France from 2600BC and also in Brittany, Switzerland and Denmark.

== Genetic profile ==
Ten individuals dated between 3400 and 2900 BC were tested from two collective burial hipogea of the Mont-Aimé site (Val-des-Marais, Marne department); six out of seven males were assigned to the Y-chromosome haplogroup I2a1b1b1 (Y13335), and there was an individual belonging to haplogroup H2a1a. The autosomal components were a mix of European farmer and Western hunter-gatherer (this one ranging from a minimum of 20% to a maximum of 55%). Two males buried in the Pierre Fritte dolmen (Yermenonville, Eure et Loire department) had the same mitochondrial haplogropup K and Y-DNA haplogroup I2a1.

== Gallery ==
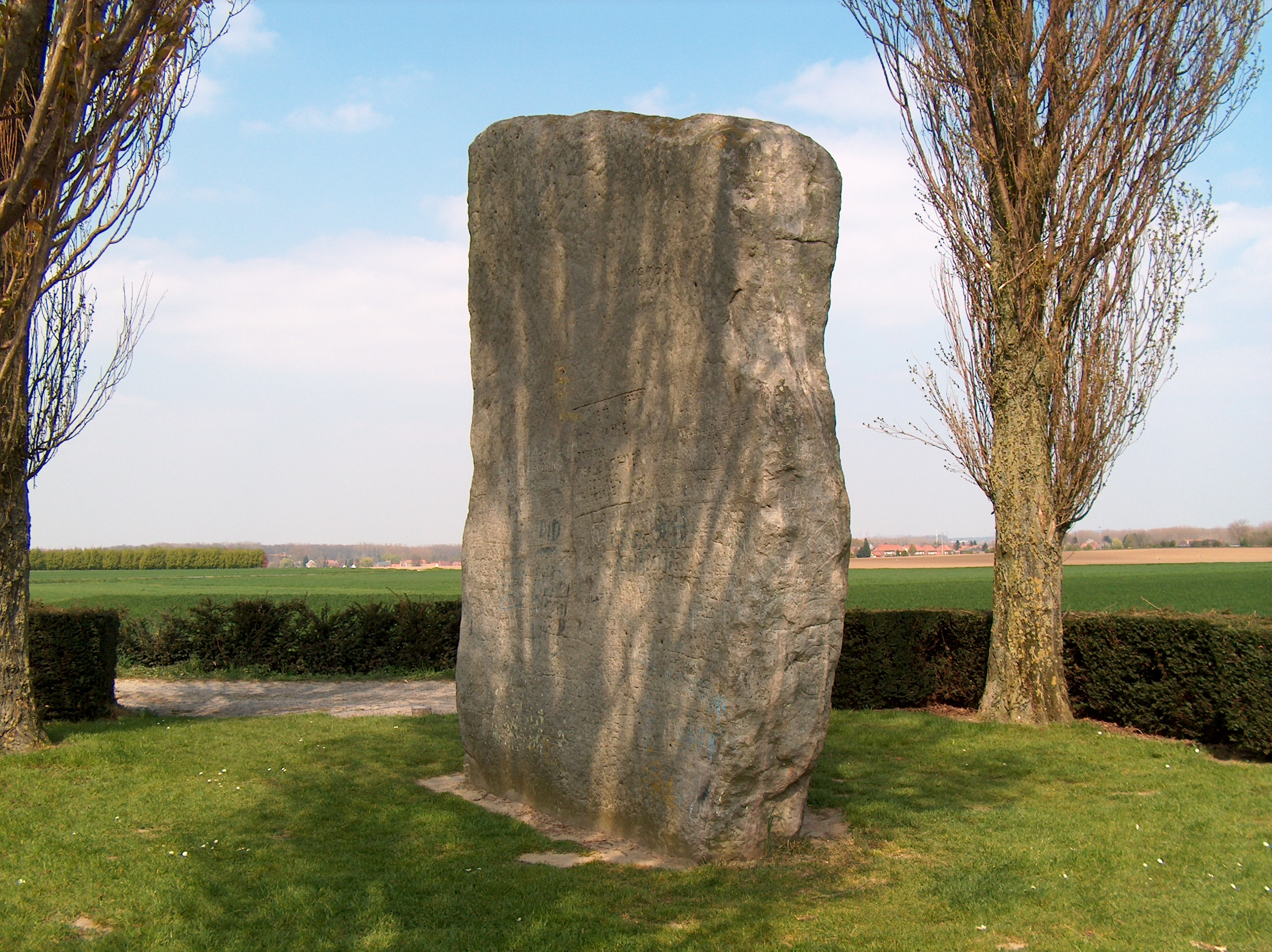
The Pierre Brunehaut, Belgium

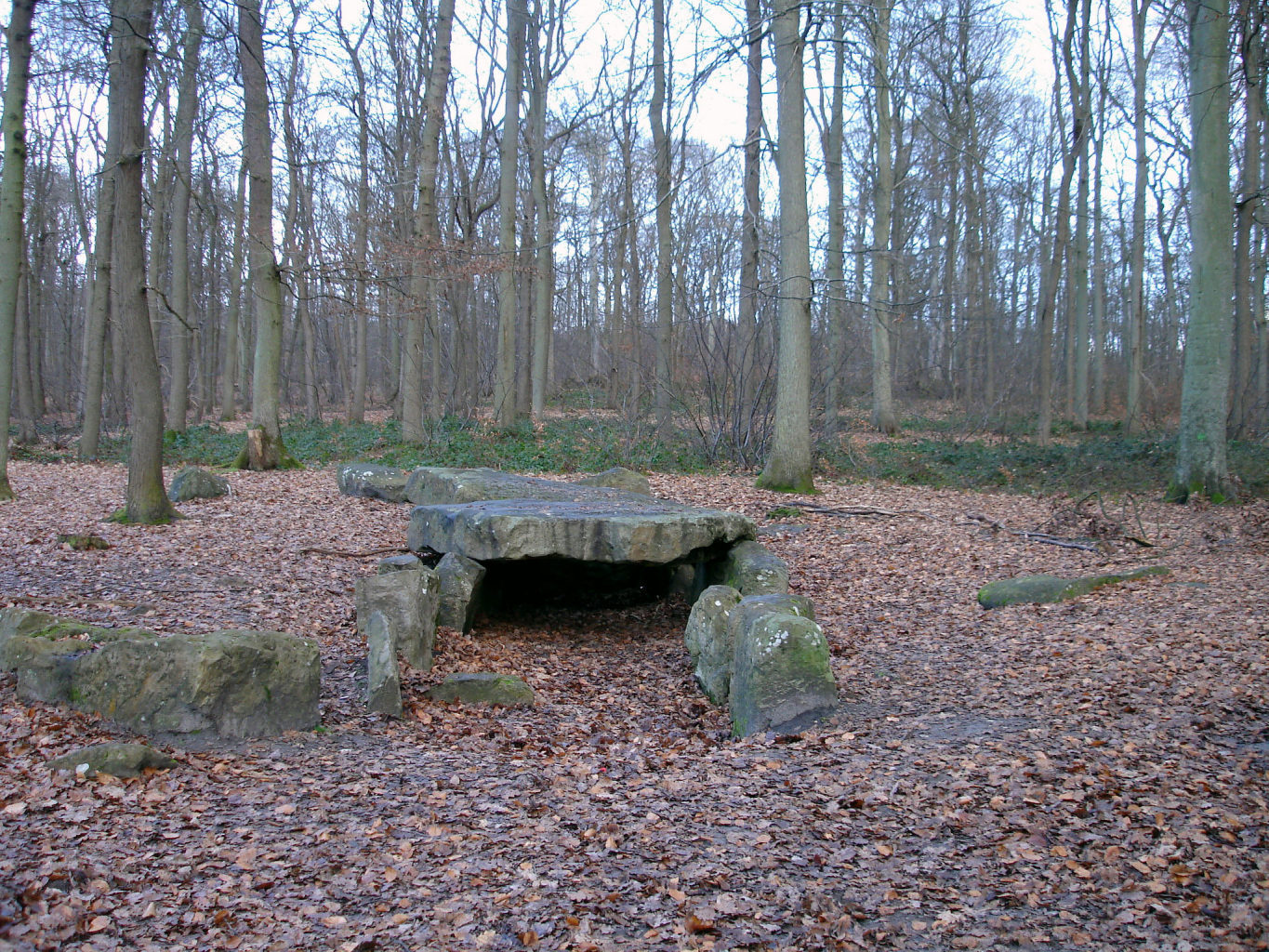
The Pierre Turquaise megalithic grave, France

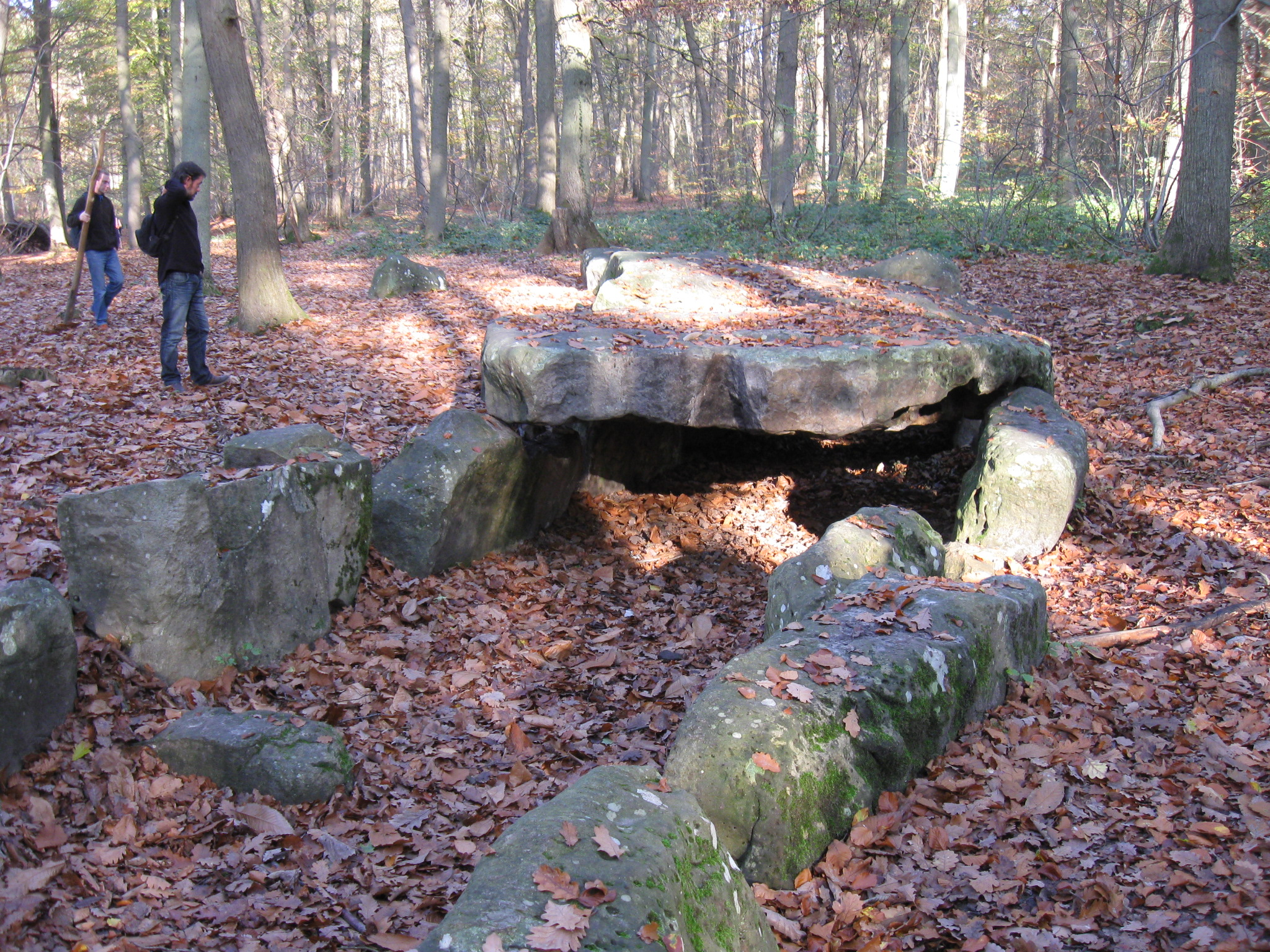
The Pierre Turquaise

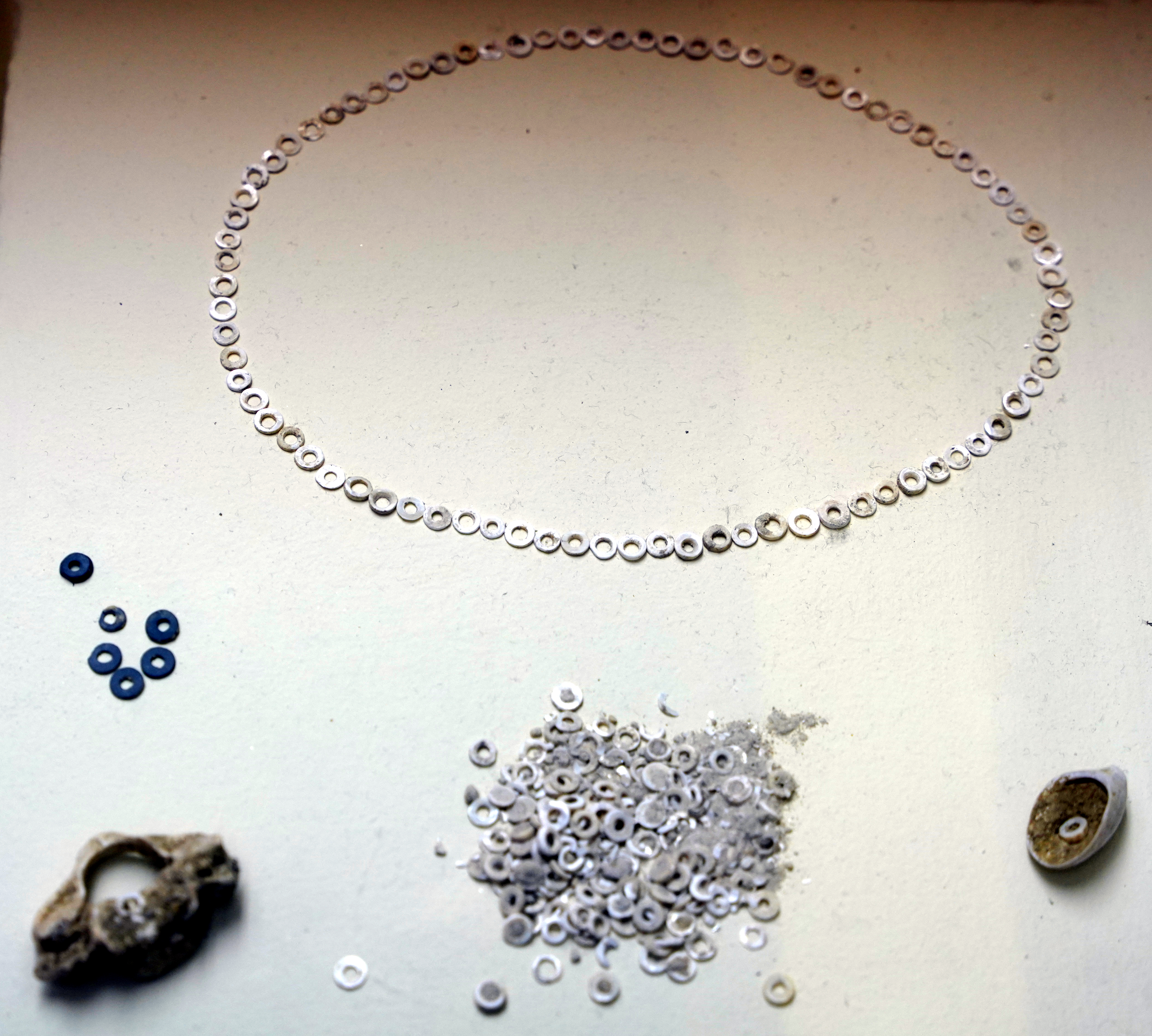

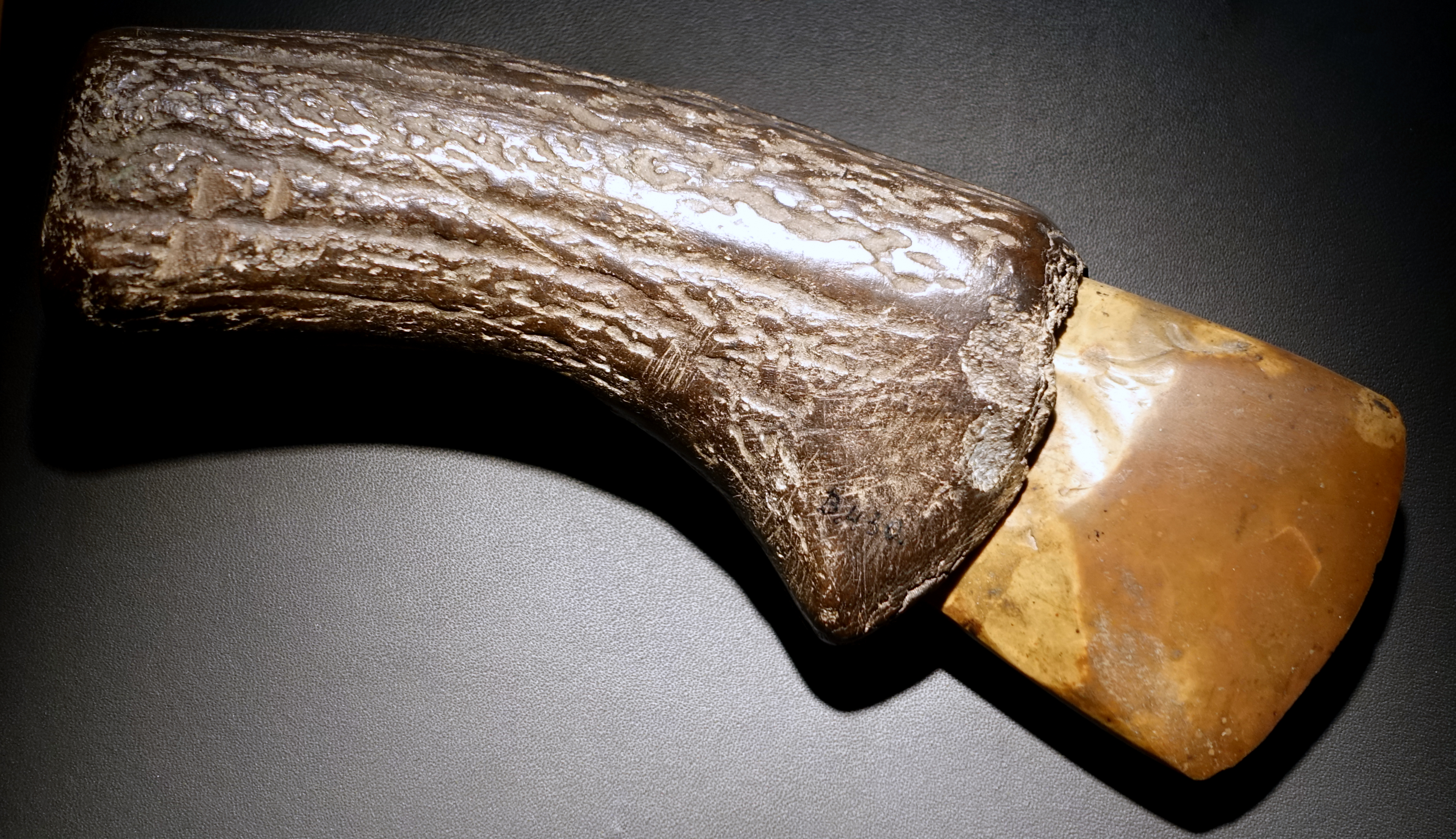

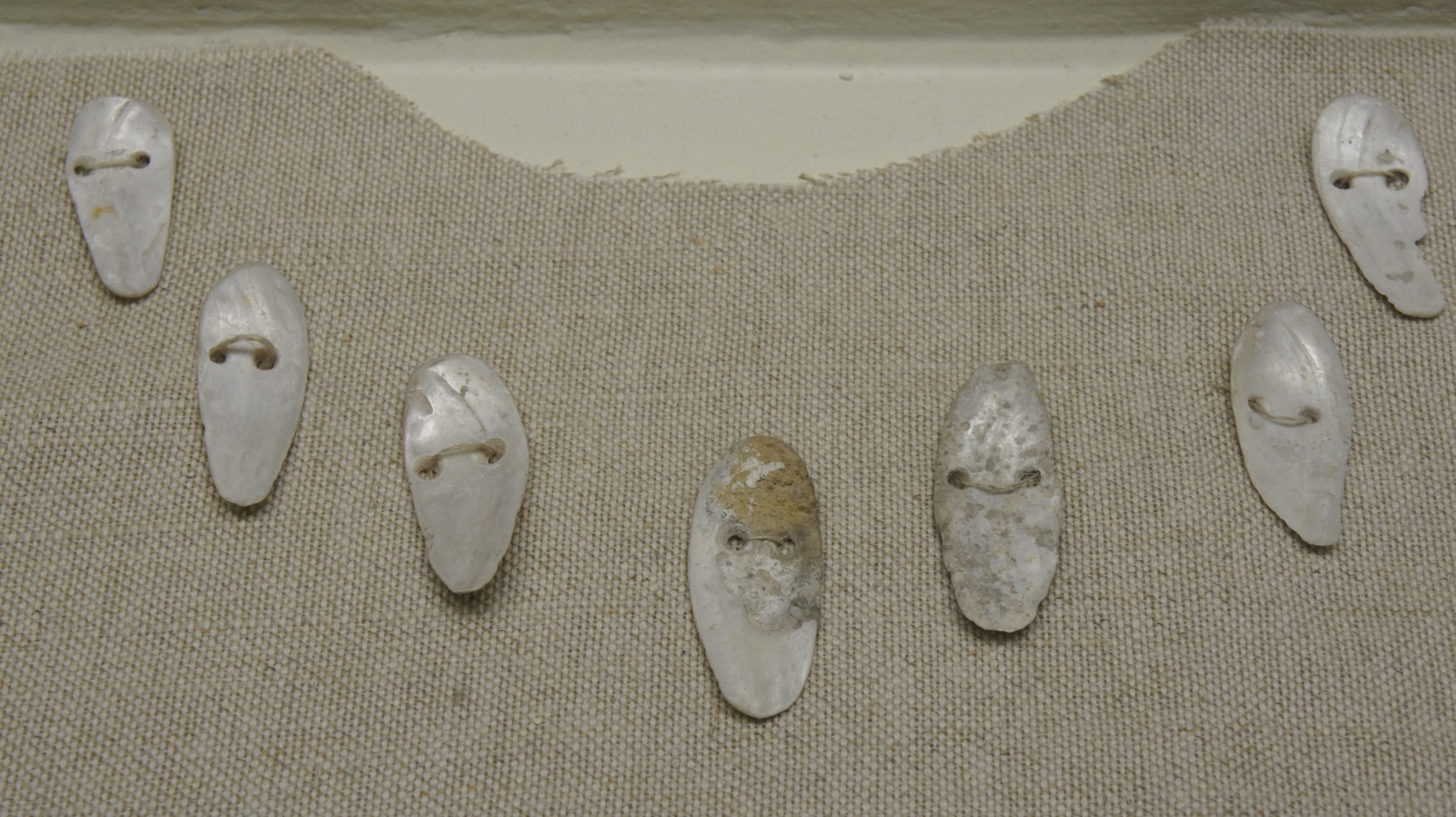

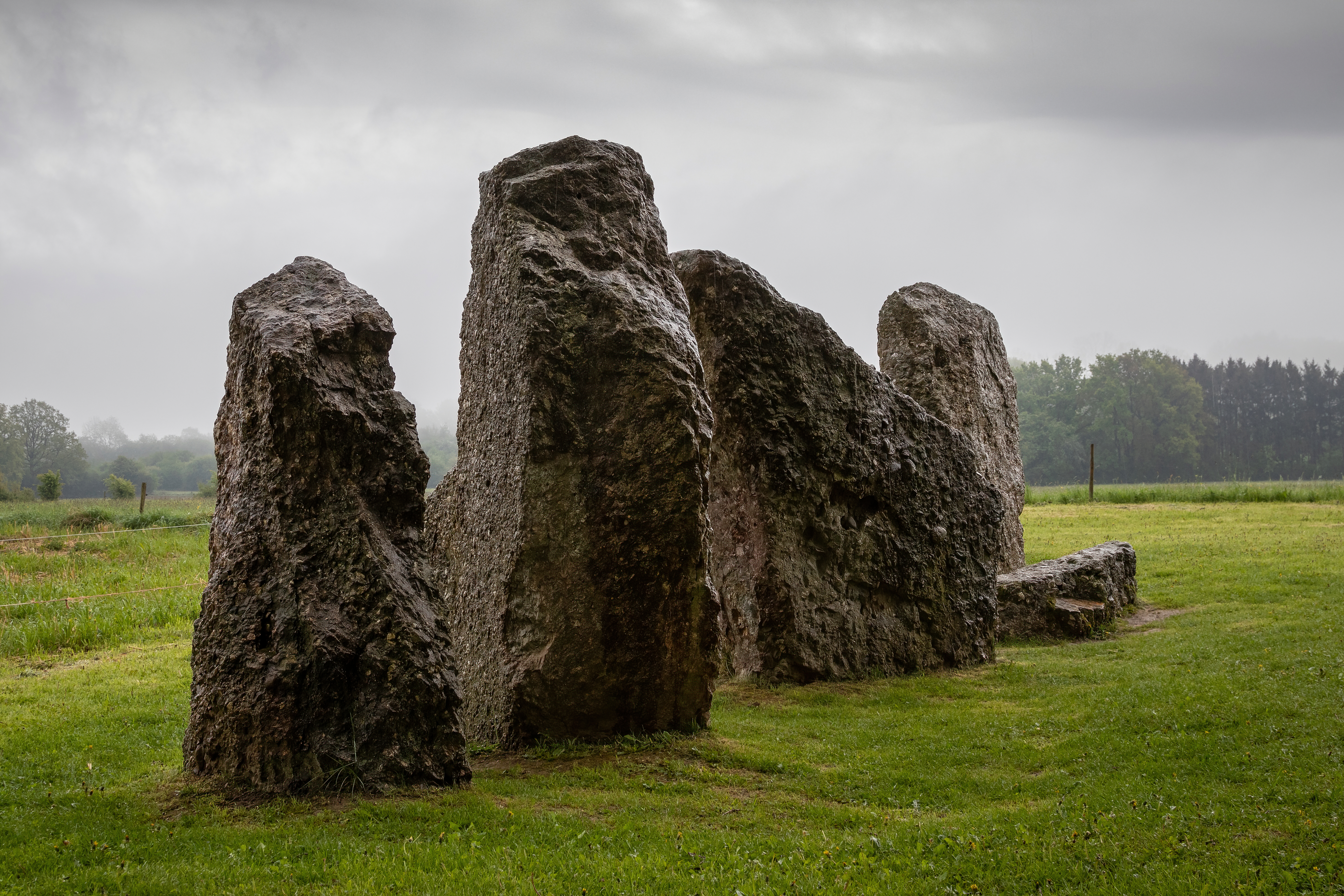

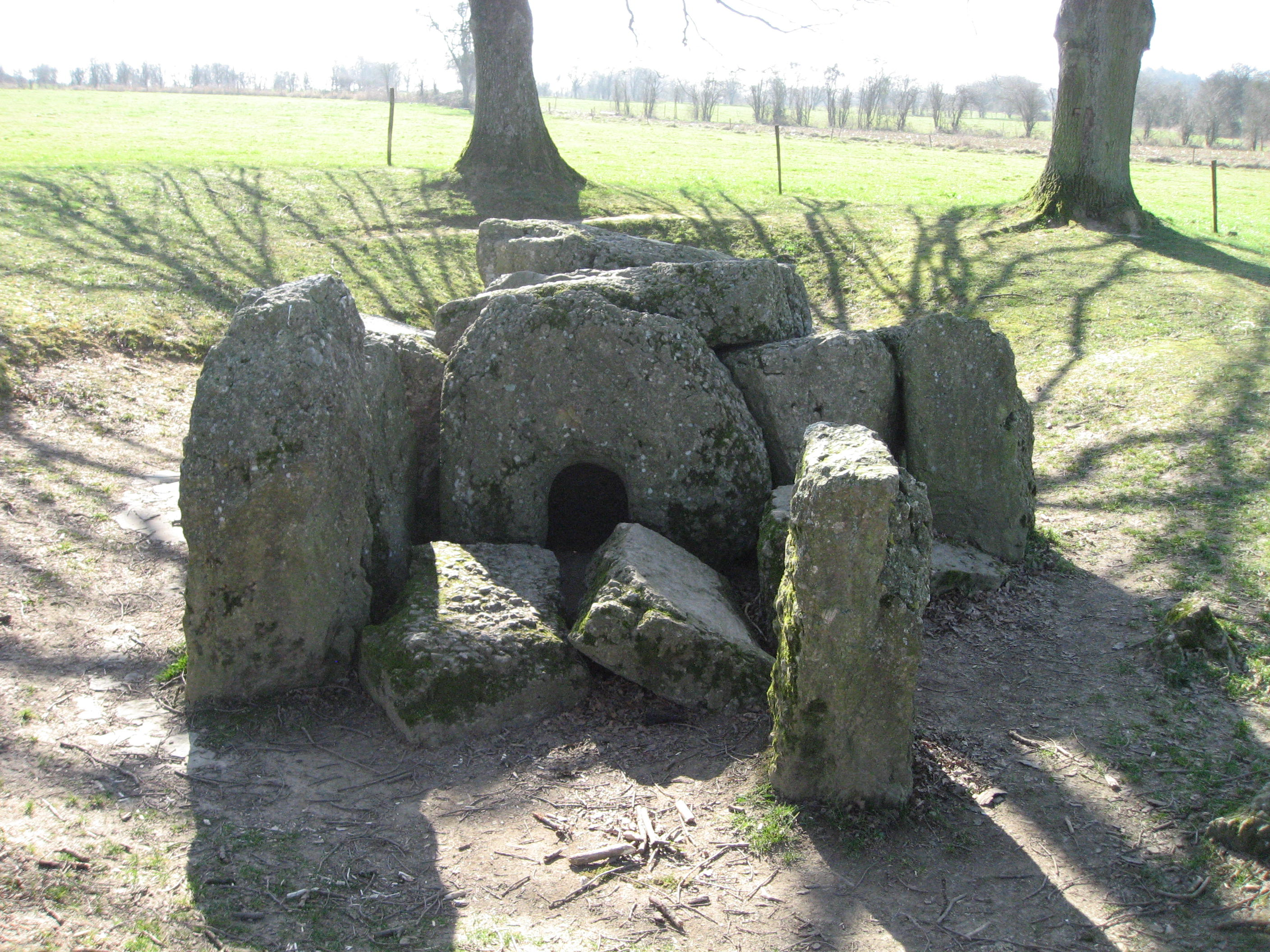

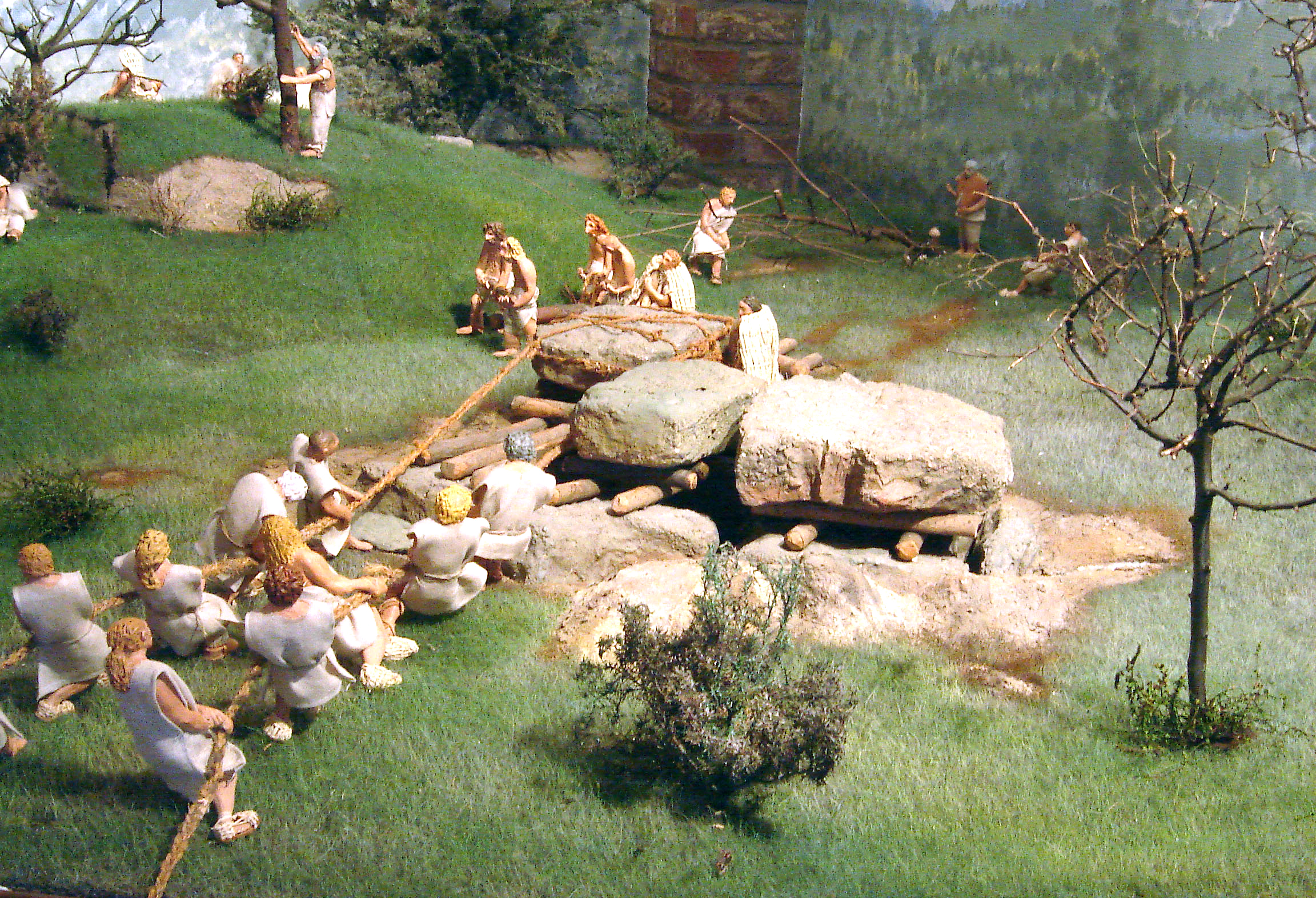

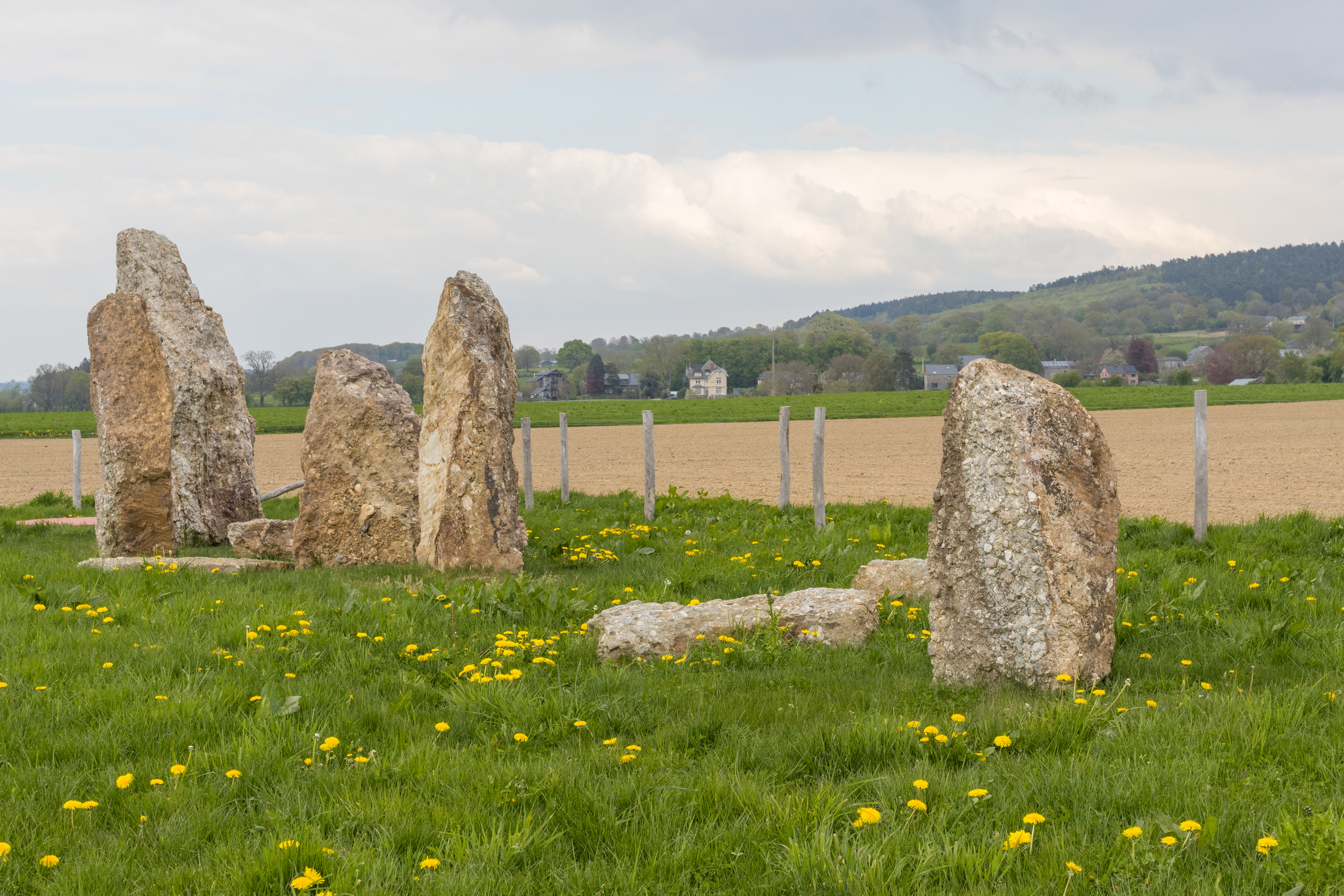
Wéris "champ de la longue pierre"

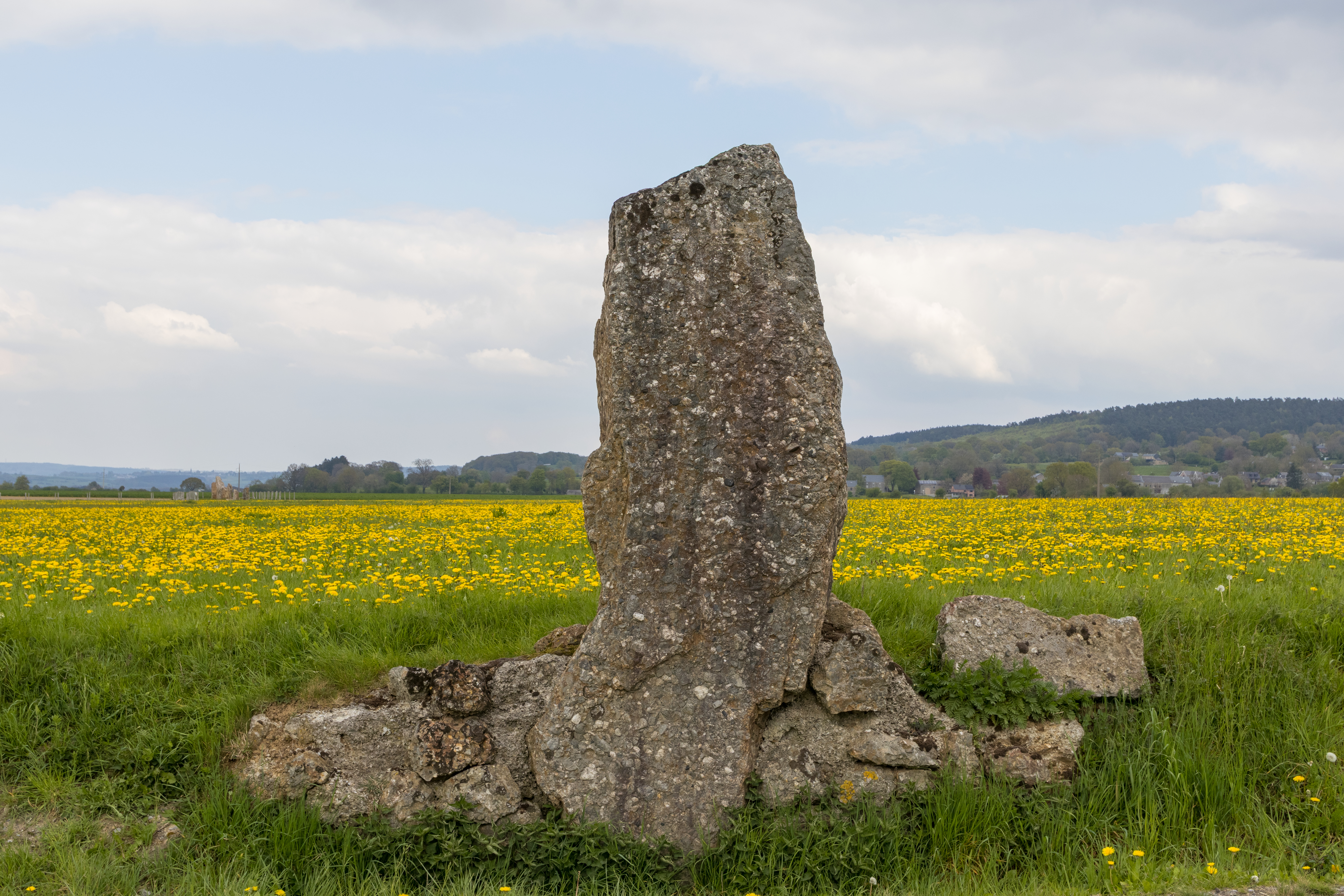
Wéris Danthine

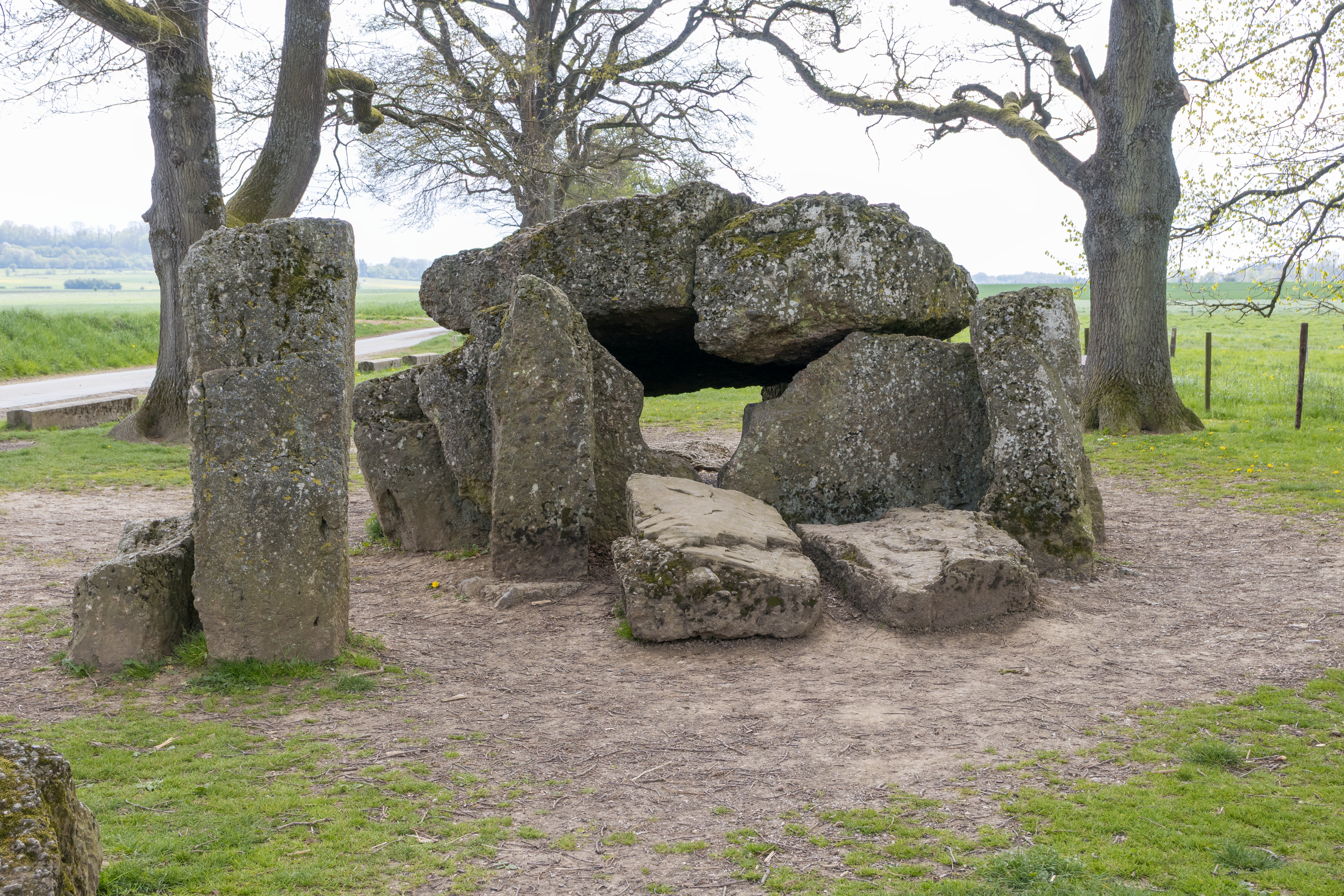
Wéris I

== See also ==
- Prehistoric France
- Chasséen culture
- Horgen culture
