= Montbolo culture =

Postcardial culture

- Geographical range: Girona, Barcelona, Pyrénées-Orientales
- Period: Neolithic
- Dates: c. 4700–3800 BC
- Type site: Montbolo (Pyrénées-Orientales, France)
- Preceded by: Cardial culture
- Followed by: Sepulcres de fossa culture
- Defined by: Jean Guilaine

The Montobolo culture was a postcardial culture which extended over the département of Pyrénees-Orientales and the provinces of Girona and Barcelona in eastern Catalonia between 4700 aC and 3800 aC.

The Montobolo style received epicardial influences (as the corded decoration), and from the Chasseen culture, from which it would have taken incised decorations and tubular handles; characteristic of the Montobolo ceramics are polished pots without decoration, tubiforme handles, and the "moustache" motif.

Some villages or dwellings are known like that of Plansallosa-II (Vall de Llierca), Vinya del Regalat (Castellar del Vallès), (Pau), La Dou (Vall d'en Bas), etc. Also caves were used as inhabiting places or storehouses: Can Sadurní (Begues), Montou (Corbera de les Cabanes), Les Grioteres (Vilanova de Sau)...

This kind of ceramics were found in collective inhumations inside caves, changing so the cardial paradigm with individual inhumations: La Balma (Montboló), Puig de Nou I (Albanyà), El Toll (Moià), L’Avellaner (Les Planes d’Hòstoles), El Pasteral (La Cellera de Ter), Mariver de Martís (Esponellà), La Cauna (Bellestar de la Frontera), La Guineu (Font-Rubí), La Font del Molinot (Pontons), etc.

The Montobolo facies is linked also with the first megalithic monuments (as before there was not any tradition erecting funerary places with stones): Camp del Ginebre (Caramany), Tavertet (cists inside a rocky barrow), Vilanera (L'Escala), and the buried cist of La Bassa (La Bisbal de l'Empordà).

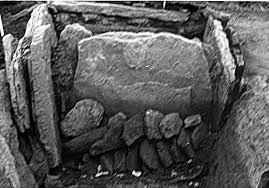
Neolithic cist with tumulus near Sant Corneli church, Tavertet (Barcelona)

== Geographic definition ==
Its area extended over the département of Pyrénees-Orientales and the provinces of Girona and Barcelona in eastern Catalonia. The northern limit was with the Chasséen culture, the southern limit was less defined as between the Gaià and Llobregat rivers it overlapped with the ceramic tradition known as Molinot. To the west (central Catalonia), it is difficult to assign a limit with the Juberrian (extended over the Pyrenean regions of Cerdanya, Alt Urgell, Andorra, Foix and Couserans).

== See also ==
- ca:Estructures funeràries megalítiques a Tavertet
- ca:Jaciment neolític de Vilanera
