= Montbolo =

Montbolo Montboló
- Commune
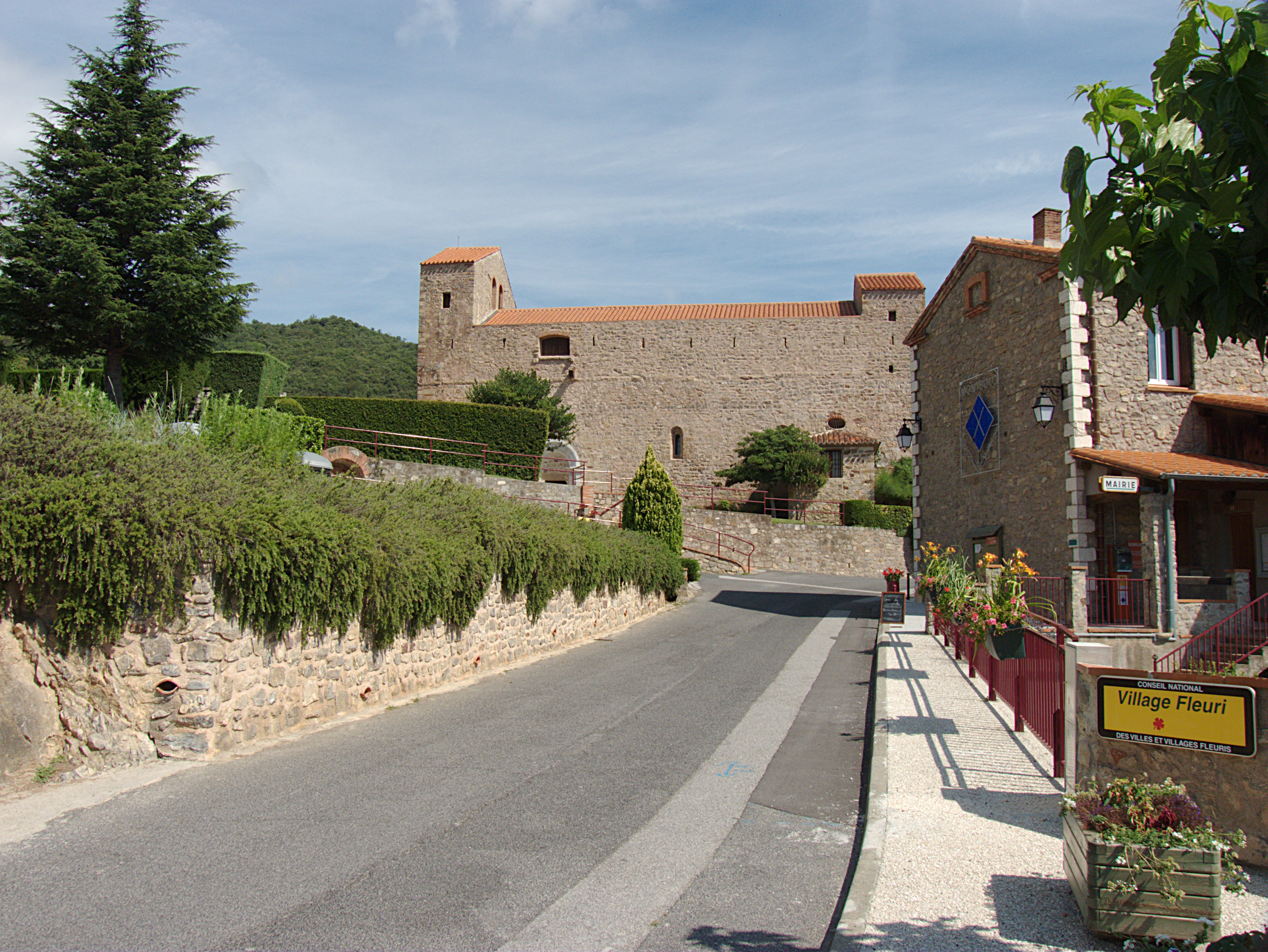
- The road into Montbolo

- Coat of arms
- Location of Montbolo
- Location within France Location within Occitanie
- Coordinates: 42°29′09″N 2°39′21″E
- Country: France
- Region: Occitania
- Department: Pyrénées-Orientales
- Arrondissement: Céret
- Canton: Le Canigou
- Intercommunality: Haut Vallespir

Government
  - Mayor (2023–2026): Marie-Josée Macabies
- Area^{1}: 21.98 km^{2} (8.49 sq mi)
- Elevation: 576 m (1,890 ft)
- Highest elevation: 1,323 m (4,341 ft)
- Lowest elevation: 240 m (790 ft)
- Population (2023): 189
  - Density: 8.60/km^{2} (22.3/sq mi)
- Time zone: UTC+01:00 (CET)
  - Summer (DST): UTC+02:00 (CEST)
- INSEE/Postal code: 66113 /66110
- ^{1} French Land Register data, which excludes lakes, ponds, glaciers > 1 km^{2} (0.386 sq mi or 247 acres) and river estuaries.

Montbolo (French pronunciation: [mɔ̃bɔlo]; Catalan: Montboló) is a commune in the Pyrénées-Orientales department in southern France.

== Geography ==
=== Localization ===
Montbolo is located in the canton of Le Canigou and in the arrondissement of Céret.

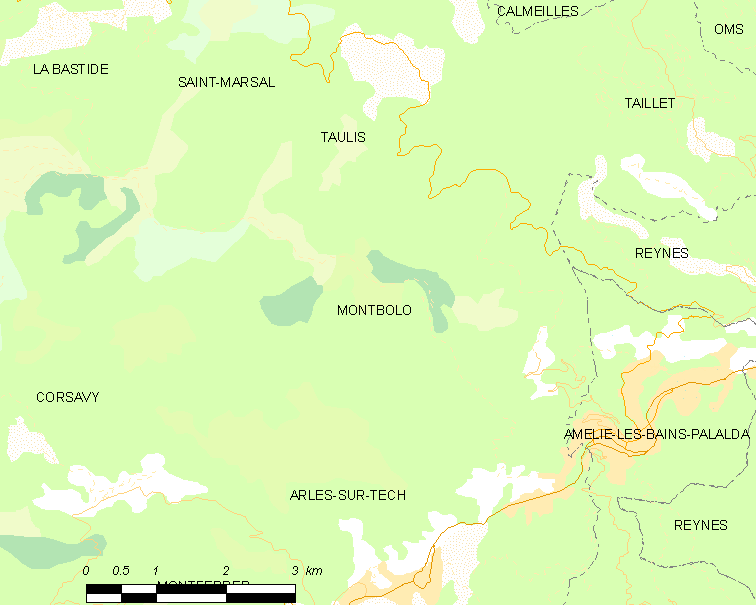
Map of Montbolo and its surrounding communes

=== Geology ===
Montbolo once had gypsum mines, used for making plaster, and also lutite and dolomite. A landslide in a gypsum stone-pit in Montbolo occurred on 20 March 1886 and killed three workers.

== Population ==
Historical population
Year	Pop.	±% p.a.
1968	124	—
1975	92	−4.17%
1982	105	+1.91%
1990	133	+3.00%
1999	145	+0.96%
2007	192	+3.57%
2012	186	−0.63%
2017	180	−0.65%
2023	189	+0.82%
Source: INSEE

== Sites of interest ==
The Saint-Andrew church of Montbolo was first built in the 12th century and then modified in the 13th, 14th and 17th centuries. At the end of the 19th century, works started for a full repair of the church, but the new roof was entirely destroyed following a storm in January 1900. Other repairs have been made more recently, such as the rebuild of the portal, which destroyed some of the older elements.

Montbolo has two dolmens: the Caixa de Rotllan, on the city limit with Arles-sur-Tech and the dolmen de Formentera.

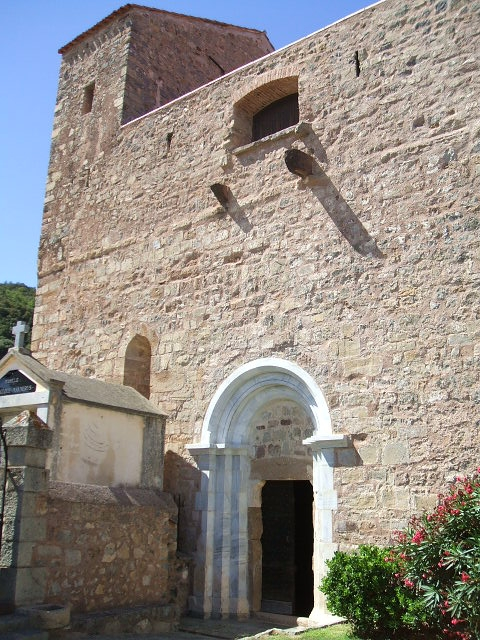
Saint-Andrew church

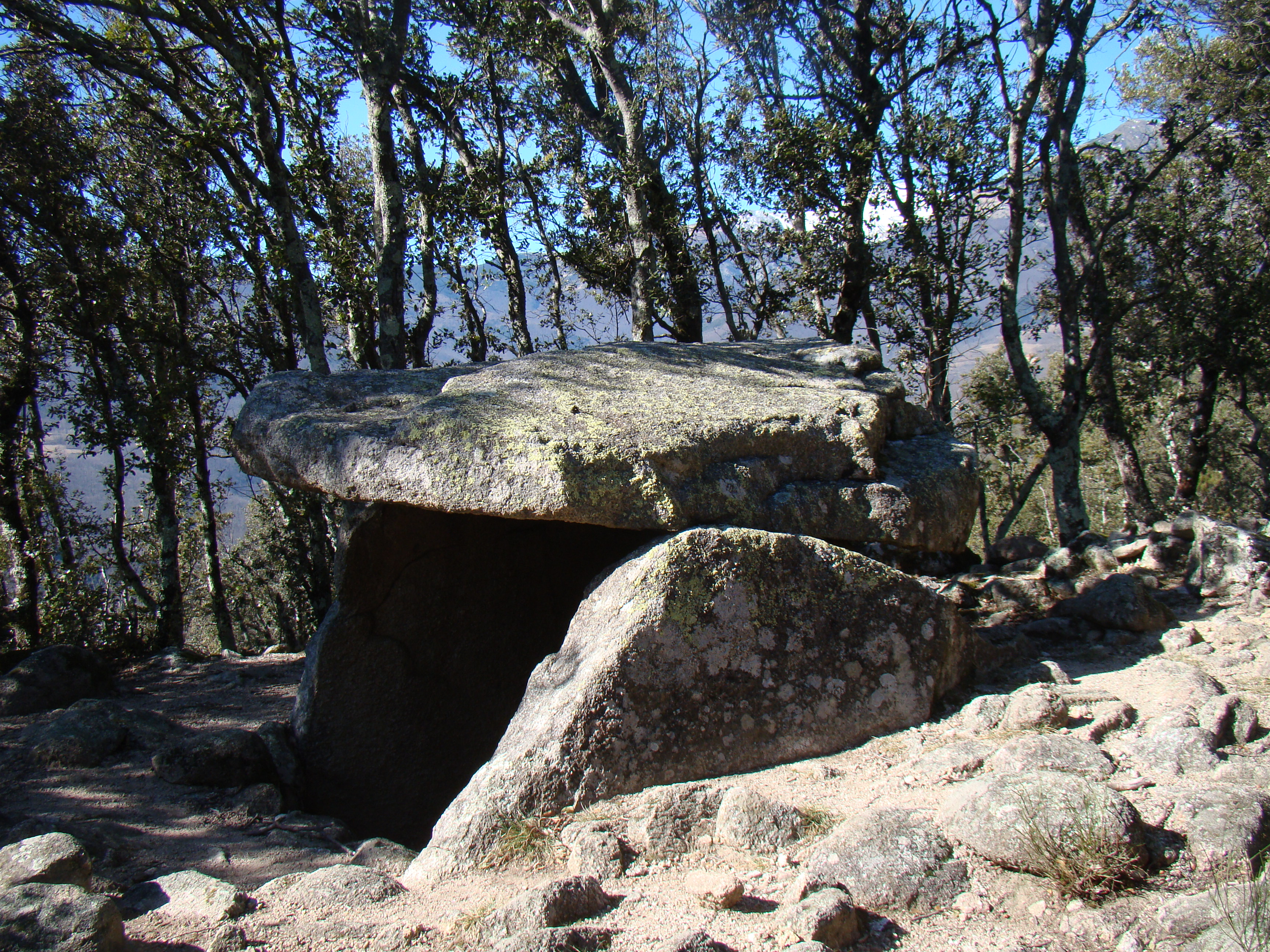
Caixa de Rotllan

== Culture ==
Poetry

- Confidences d'un moutard parisien (1912) is a poem by the writer Marc Anfossi which mentions Montbolo, Palalda and Montalba-d'Amélie.

== See also ==
- Communes of the Pyrénées-Orientales department
- Montbolo culture
