= Sepulcres de fossa culture =

Neolithic archaeological culture

Sepulcres de Fossa culture
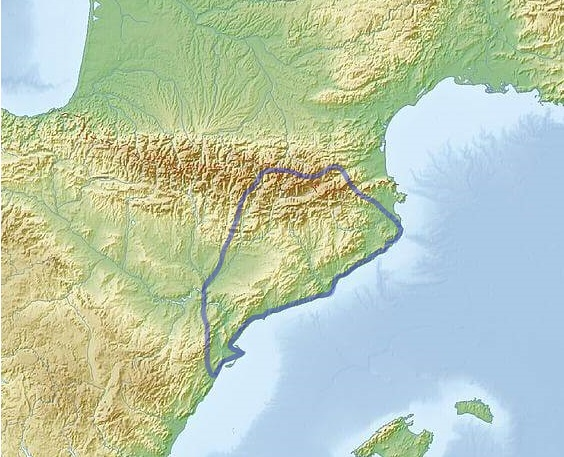
- Geographical range: Catalonia, Andorra
- Period: Later Neolithic
- Dates: 4200-3600 BC
- Preceded by: Cardial culture, Montbolo culture
- Followed by: Véraza culture
- Defined by: Pere Bosch-Gimpera

The Sepulcres de Fossa culture (Spanish "Cultura de los Sepulcros de Fosa"), was established in Catalonia in the Middle Neolithic and remained there until the beginning of the third millennium BC. Although initially this culture was linked to the Almeria culture, nowadays it is believed that it was related to the Cortaillod culture of Switzerland, the Lagozza culture of northern Italy, and the Chasseen culture found in French territory.

== Name ==
Its name derives from its characteristic burial tradition: from Catalan "Sepulcres de Fossa" which could be translated as "Pit Graves" or "Pit Burials".

== Subdivisions ==
Geographic-related burial typologies provide three main regional facies:

- Vallesian (southern half of Barcelona province), with simple pits.
- Solsonian (between the Llobregat river and the Segre river), with buried cists.
- Empordanian (northeastern Girona province), with cists under tumulus and dolmens with corridor.

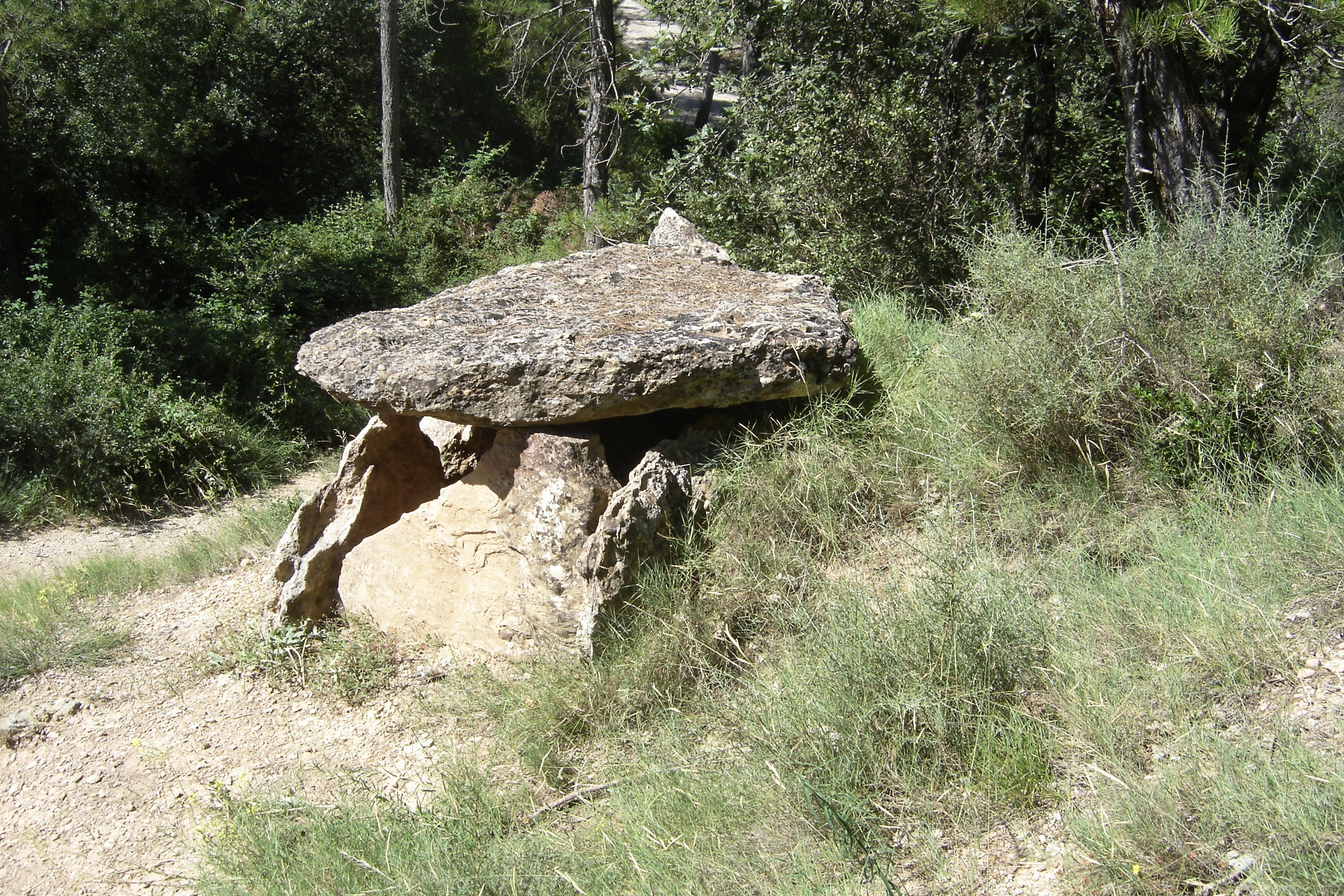
Cista I of the Ceuró necropolis (Castellar de la Ribera, Lleida province)

== Dwellings ==
Domestic structures were found in archaeological sites like La Serreta (Vilafranca del Penedès), Bòbila Madurell (Sant Quirze del Vallès), Can Roqueta/Torre Romeu (Sabadell), Ca n’Isach (Palau-saverdera), etc. Some caves were used as residence also (Cova Gran per example).

== Artifacts ==
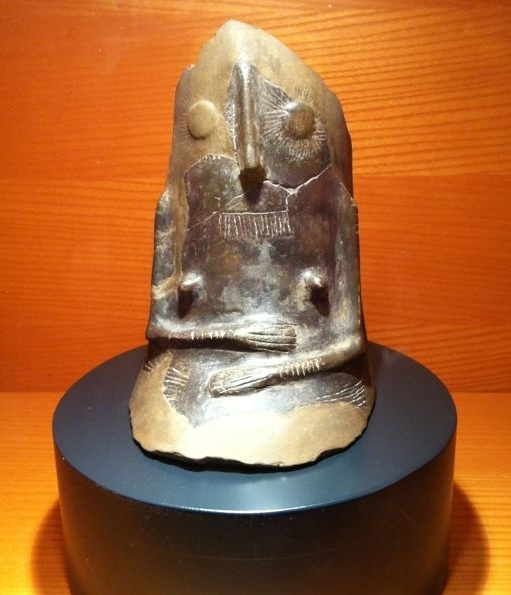
Venus of Gavà in the Gavà Museum and the Gavà Mines Archaeological Park

The pottery is generally smooth, being usually carenated. Decoration is not usual, but when it is documented it can be linked with the Chasséen types. Several sites have a synchronous presence of Sepulcres de Fosses' pots with ceramics of the Molinot and Montoboló post-Cardial styles.

The so-called Gavà Venus is an incomplete figure-vessel with sun-shaped eyes, relief nose, comb-shaped necklace, relief breasts and relief arms resting over a swollen belly. It has been interpreted as a fertility goddess.

== Burials ==
Tombs were pits dug into the ground with slabs that either covered only the pit or formed a more complex architectural structure of a megalithic character with a chamber, protecting the buried individual; the structures made up entirely of slabs are named by its morphology cist; many examples of such cists appear in the Solsonès area between Barcelona and Lleida provinces, forming a cultural subgroup. Several necropolises are known, as Camí de Can Grau, Mines de Gavà, Plà del Riu de les Marcetes, Bòbila Madurell, Can Gambús, etc.

One (or infrequently two individuals) were found in this type of funeral register, although in the case of the Solsonian group we can find the reuse of the same chamber. The bodies were placed in the grave with the arms and legs flexed. The head was placed in the east and the legs in the west.

The morphologies of funerary structures as the grave goods found there are very similar, such as undecorated smooth ceramics, polished stone axes, flint arrowheads, knives, bone needles and necklaces made of variscite (which probably originates from the exploitation of the Can Tintoré mines of Gavà or Gavà Mines).

The pit grave was a new kind of funerary custom in the region: the previous Cardial and Epi-Cardial burials were inside caves, and the Véraza Culture will reuse caves as burial sites along the erection of megalithic structures.

== Bibliography ==
- MUÑOZ, A.M., (1997) La cultura de los sepulcros de fosa: una sociedad neolítica Espacio, Tiempo y Forma, Serie I, Prehistoria y Arqueología, t. 10, págs. 265–268.
- CASTANY, J., (2008). Els megàlits neolítics del solsonià (Treball de tesi doctoral inèdit), Universitat de Lleida.
- RIPOLL & LLONGUERES (1963). La cultura neolítica de los sepulcros de fosa en Cataluña. Ampurias XXV, pp. 1–90. Barcelona.
