= Transverse arrowhead =

Arrowhead with a straight cutting edge

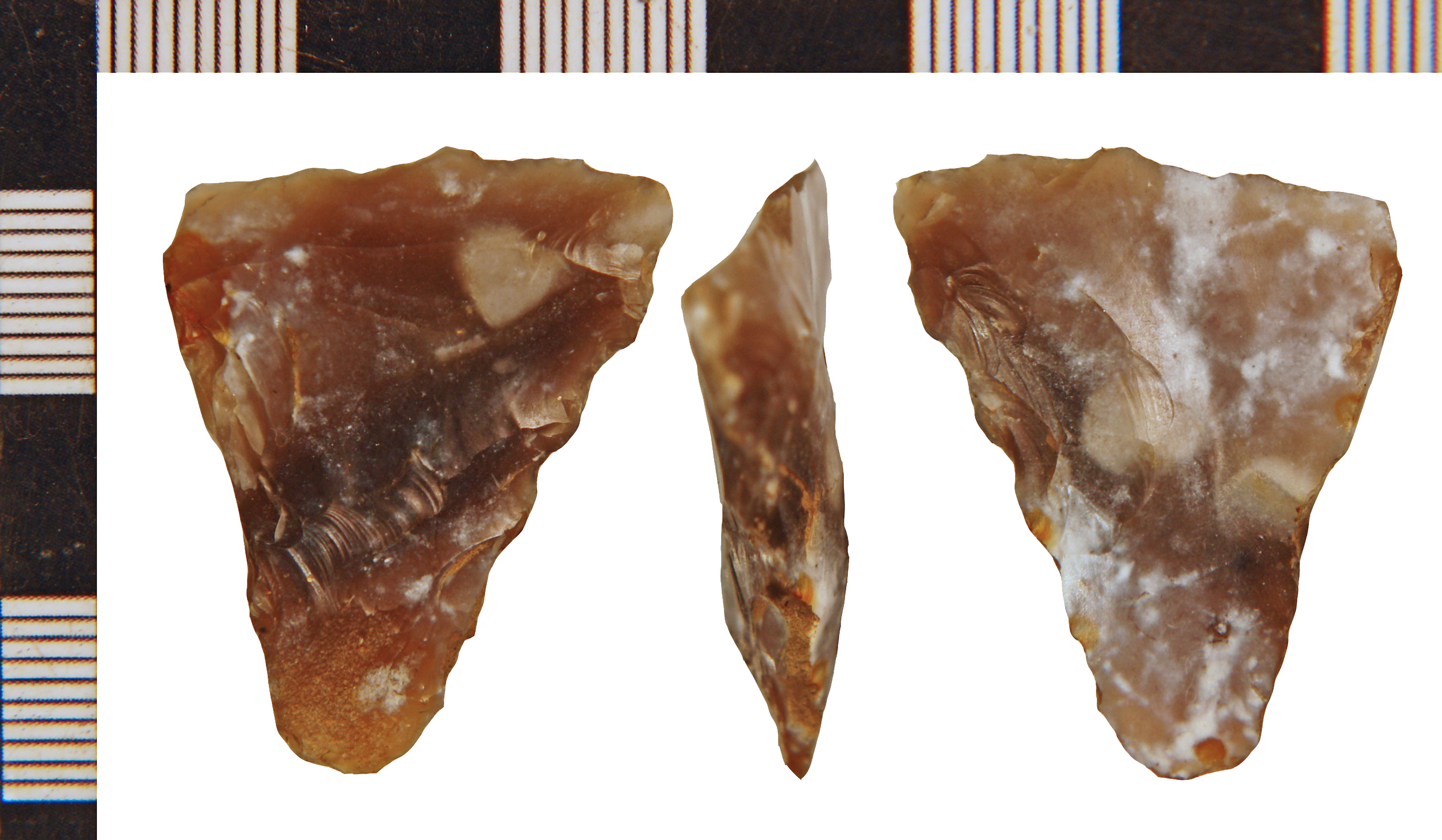
Neolithic transverse arrowhead, found in Lincolnshire, UK

A transverse arrowhead is a type of trapezoidal or triangular stone projectile point most commonly associated with the European Mesolithic and Neolithic periods although it is also found in other regions and periods.

Unlike a conventional arrowhead which tapers to a point, transverse arrowheads widen to a cutting edge and was hafted onto an arrow shaft at its narrowest point. Other types have parallel sides but in any case transverse arrowheads are always wider than they are long.
