= Véraza culture =

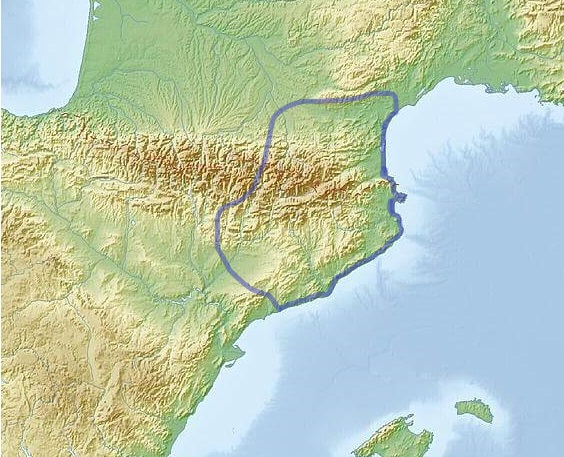
- Geographical range: Northern Catalonia, Pyrénées-Orientales, Aude
- Period: Chalcolithic
- Dates: c. 3500–2000 BC
- Type site: Véraza (Aude, France)
- Preceded by: Sepulcres de fossa culture and Chasséen culture
- Followed by: Bell Beaker culture
- Defined by: Jean Guilaine

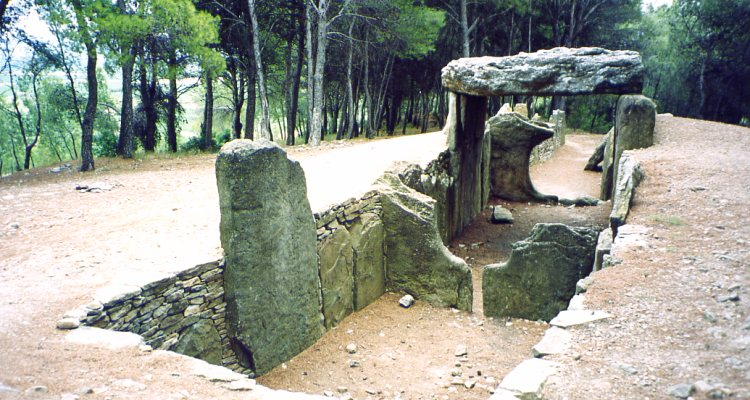
Dolmen Lo Morrel dos Fados (Pépieux, Aude)

The Veraza Culture was a Chalcolithic culture that extended over the half north of Catalonia and the southern French departments of Aude and Pyrénées-Orientales, in a period between 3500 and 2000 BC.

== Dwellings ==
The hamlets were usually in plains, without defensive structures (Camp del Rector, La Prunera). The huts were aerial, as postholes were used to keep the structure, other huts had instead a stone basement (Ca n'Isach, El Coll), and even others were partially excavated on the ground (Can Vinyals).

== Artifacts ==
Clothing was advanced as a spindle whorl used to create textiles was found in Bòbila Madurell site (Sant Quirze del Vallès, Barcelona province). Metallurgy was used and some beads made of gold and copper are known.

== Burials ==
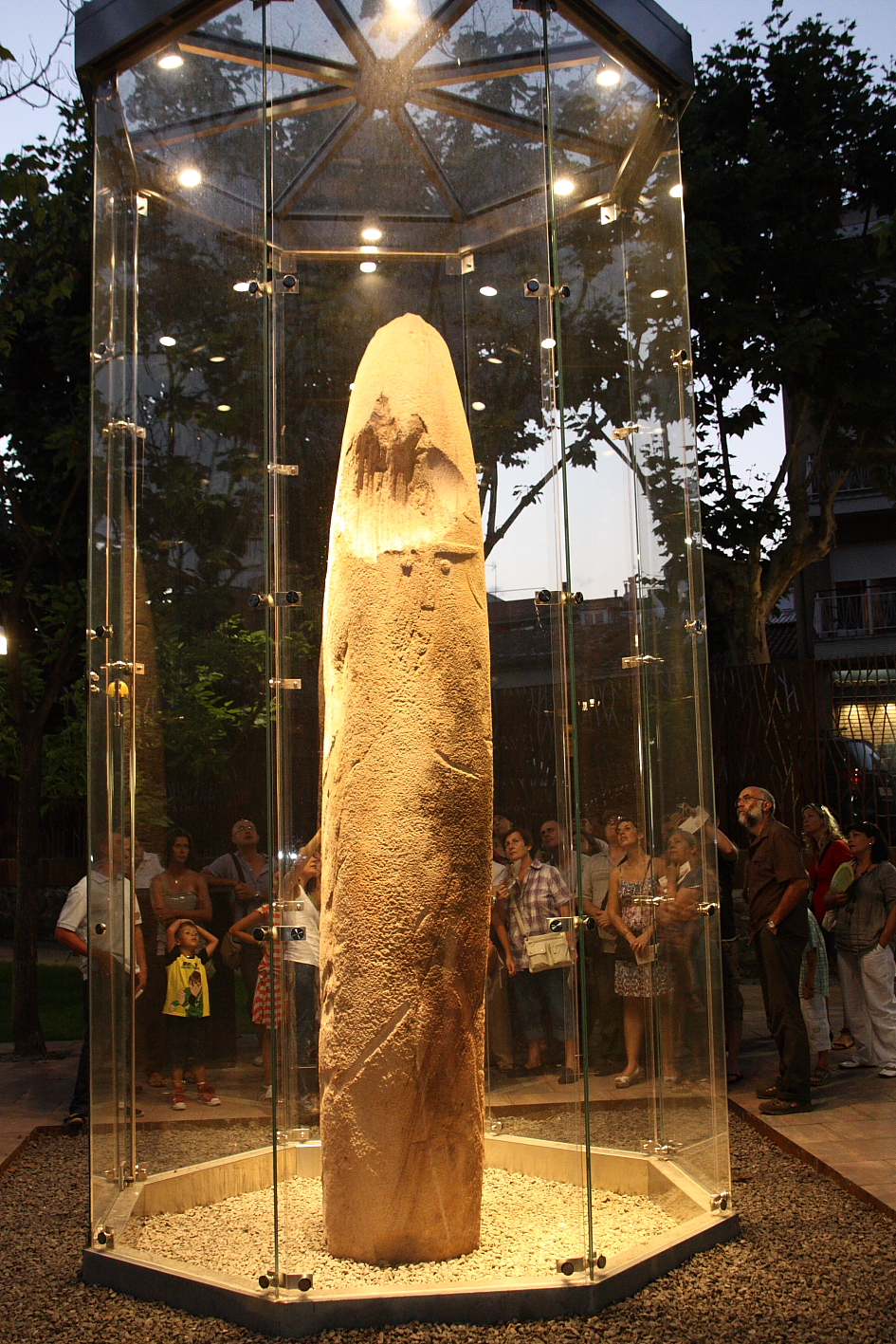
Menhir of Mollet, found in Pla de les Pruneres (4,9 meters high)

The Veraza people were responsible for erecting many of the megalithic monuments in the region where they were settled, as was the case with the dolmen Lo Morrel dos Fados, Pépieux (Aude).

Other burials known from the Véraza culture were caves (Cova del Frare, Cau de la Guineu), artificial caves with megalithic entrance known as paradolmens (Rec de la Quarentena, Costa de Can Martorell), collective pits, and hypogea.

Menhirs were erected like those of Mollet, Sitja del Llop or Ca l'Estrada.

== Genetic profile ==
Individuals buried in paradolmens of La Clape massif near Narbonne (Grotte du Rouquet and Grotte des Tortues), and dated to the last third of the IV millennium (Véraza period) were genetically tested: all males had Y-chromosome haplogroup I-M438, being four males assigned to the subclade I2a1b1b1, and the other to I2a1a2. The autosomal components were 3/4 Ancient Neolithic Farmer, 1/4 Western Hunter-Gatherer. In the southernmost geographic range of the Véraza culture, 13 individuals found in the paradolmen Cova de la Guineu (Font-Rubí, Barcelona) were tested, the Y-DNA results of the individuals with enough genetic coverage were: 2 x I, 1 x I2, 1 x I2a2a, 2 x G2a (G2a2a1a3 and G2a2b2b1a1). The remains of three individuals buried in the dolmen des Fades (or Morrel dos Fados) were tested, the Y-DNA of the male individual was assigned to the subclade I2a1a1a1.
