= Arles-sur-Tech =

Arles-sur-Tech Arles de Tec (Catalan)
- Commune
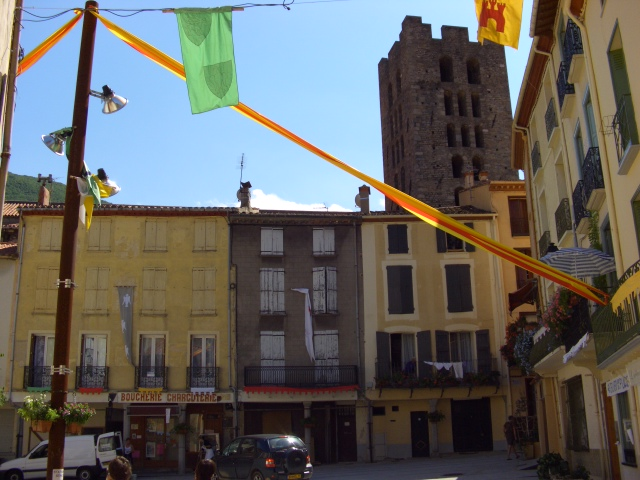
- Shops in Arles-sur-Tech, with the Tour Saint-Sauveur in the background
- Location of Arles-sur-Tech
- Location within France Location within Occitanie
- Coordinates: 42°27′27″N 2°38′04″E
- Country: France
- Region: Occitania
- Department: Pyrénées-Orientales
- Arrondissement: Céret
- Canton: Le Canigou
- Intercommunality: CC du Haut Vallespir

Government
  - Mayor (2020–2026): David Planas
- Area^{1}: 28.82 km^{2} (11.13 sq mi)
- Elevation: 300 m (980 ft)
- Highest elevation: 1,302 m (4,272 ft)
- Lowest elevation: 226 m (741 ft)
- Population (2023): 2,815
  - Density: 97.68/km^{2} (253.0/sq mi)
- Time zone: UTC+01:00 (CET)
  - Summer (DST): UTC+02:00 (CEST)
- INSEE/Postal code: 66009 /66150
- ^{1} French Land Register data, which excludes lakes, ponds, glaciers > 1 km^{2} (0.386 sq mi or 247 acres) and river estuaries.

Arles-sur-Tech (French pronunciation: [aʁl syʁ tɛk], literally Arles on Tech; Occitan: Arles sus Tech; Catalan: Arles de Tec) is a commune in the Pyrénées-Orientales department in southern France.

== Geography ==
=== Location ===
Arles-sur-Tech is located in the canton of Le Canigou and in the arrondissement of Céret.

Arles-sur-Tech is situated in the southernmost valley in mainland France before Spain, the Vallespir, through which the 84 km (52 mi) long river "Tech" flows. This small town is surrounded by the eastern Pyrenees which dominate the skyline around Arles-sur-Tech. The town sits on the only main road which passes through the valley, the D 115, making it accessible from Spain in the west and the plane of Roussillon and Perpignan in the east. It is located close to the larger and more well-known spa town of Amélie-les-Bains-Palalda.

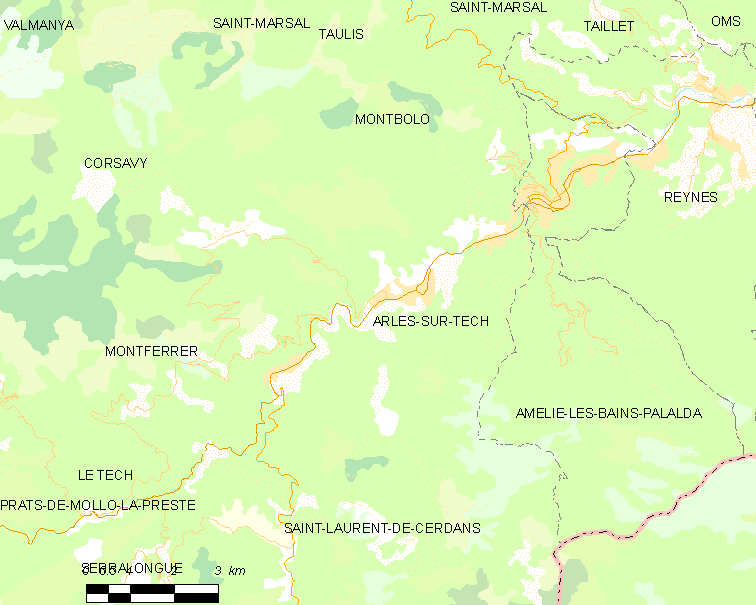
Map of Arles-sur-Tech and its surrounding communes

== History ==
At the end of the Spanish Civil War Arles-sur-Tech was the site of a camp housing Republican escapees from Spain. It was used as an initial sorting camp.

== Government and politics ==
=== Mayors ===
Mayor	Term start	Term end
Jean-Baptiste Serradell	1807	1808
Abdon Desclaus	1808	1813
Jean-Baptiste Serradell	1813	1815
Jean Galangau	1815	1827
Dominique Jofre	1827	1830
Jean Pujade	1830	1832
Etienne Grau	1832	1835
Pierre Mouchart	1835	1837
Jacques Dubois	1837	1839
Jean Serreclare	1839	1840
François Comaills	1840	1848
Etienne Douffiagues	1848	1849
Joseph Boix	1849	1850
Joseph Pallarès	1892	1908
Jean Vilar	1908	1914
Baptiste Pams	1914	1941
Lucien Trenet (father of Charles Trenet)	1941	1942
Pierre Sola	1942	1944
Baptiste Pams	1944	1967
Paul Lavanga	1967	1983
Marcel Charlet	1983	1989
Albert Costa	1989	2001
René Ala	2001	2008
René Bantoure	2008	2020
David Planas	2020	incumbent

=== International relations ===
Arles-sur-Tech is twinned with:

- Cubelles, Spain

== Population ==
Historical population
Year	Pop.	±% p.a.
1968	2,760	—
1975	2,945	+0.93%
1982	2,889	−0.27%
1990	2,837	−0.23%
1999	2,700	−0.55%
2007	2,719	+0.09%
2012	2,671	−0.36%
2017	2,705	+0.25%
2023	2,815	+0.67%
Source: INSEE

== Sites of interest ==
- Abbey of Saint Mary : Arles-sur-Tech is best known for its abbey, which allegedly holds the relics of Saints Abdon and Sennen in a sarcophagus called Sainte Tombe, traditionally believed to have been brought from Rome by Abbot Arnulf in the middle of the tenth century. Its waters are traditionally believed to hold miraculous healing properties.
- The Caixa de Rotllan, a dolmen.
- Saint-Stephen church
- Saint-Saviour church
- Saint-Peter church
- Holy Cross church
- The Fou canyon, said to be the world's narrowest.

== Bibliography ==
- Abbé Adolphe Crastre, Histoire du martyre des saints Abdon et Sennen, de leurs reliques, de leurs miracles, de leur culte et de l'eau miraculeuse du sarcophage (Amélie-les-Bains, 1932). Facsimile reprint, Nîmes: Les Éditions Lacour-Ollé, 2005. ISBN 2-7504-1045-2

== See also ==
- Communes of the Pyrénées-Orientales department
