= Chasséen culture =

Archaeological culture in prehistoric France

- Geographical range: France
- Period: Neolithic
- Dates: 4500–3500 BC
- Preceded by: Cerny culture
- Followed by: Seine-Oise-Marne culture, Véraza culture in southern Languedoc, Treilles culture in the Causses, Ferrières culture in eastern Languedoc, and La Couronne culture in Provence

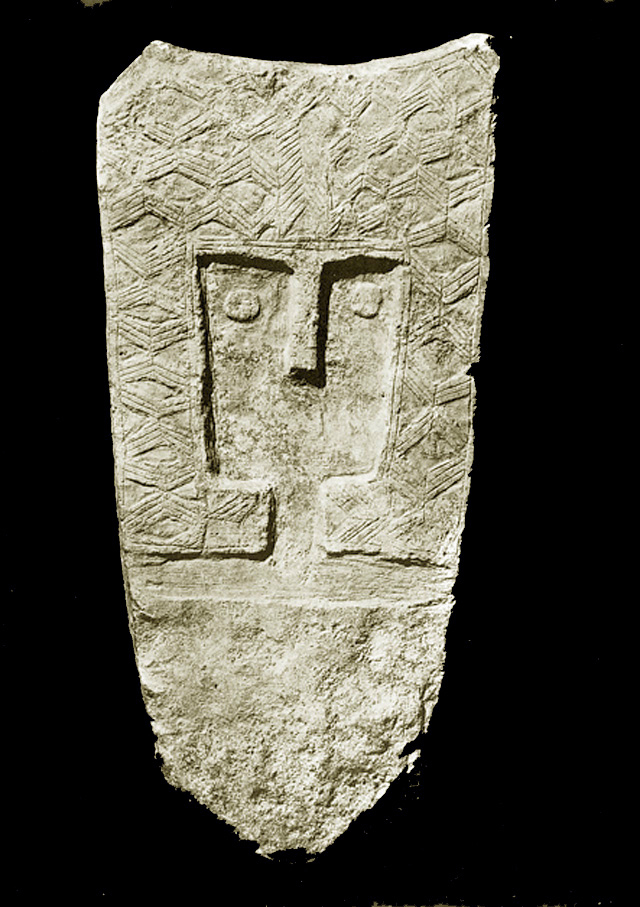
Stele de Lauris, 4th millennium BC

Chasséen culture is the name given to the archaeological culture of prehistoric France of the Late Neolithic, which dates to roughly between 4500 BC and 3500 BC. The name "Chasséen" derives from the type site near Chassey-le-Camp (Saône-et-Loire).

It covered an area roughly corresponding with the actual French regions of Occitanie and Provence-Alpes-Côte d'Azur. The septentrional Chasséen culture spread throughout the plains and plateaux of France, including the Seine basin and the upper Loire valleys, and extended to the present-day départments of Haute-Saône, Vaucluse, Alpes-de-Haute-Provence, Pas-de-Calais, and Eure-et-Loir. Excavations at Bercy (in Paris) have revealed a Chasséen village (4000 BC - 3800 BC) on the right bank of the Seine; artifacts include wood canoes, pottery, bows and arrows, and wood and stone tools.

Chasséens were sedentary farmers (rye, panic grass, millet, apples, pears, prunes) and herders (sheep, goats, oxen, pigs). They lived in huts organized into small villages (100-400 people). Their pottery was little decorated. They had no metal technology (which appeared later) but mastered the use of flint.

By roughly 3500 BC, the Chasséen culture in France gave way to the late Neolithic transitional Seine-Oise-Marne culture (3100BC - 2000 BC) in Northern France and to a series of archaeological cultures in Southern France.

== Timeline ==
- 4000: Chasséen village of Bercy near Paris
- 4400: Chasséen village of Saint-Michel du Touch near Toulouse.
- 4400: Appearance of Rössen culture at Baume de Gonvillars in Haute-Saône.
- 3190: Chasséen culture in Calvados.
- 3530: Chasséen culture in Pas-de-Calais.
- 3450: End of Chasséen culture in Eure-et-Loir.
- 3400: End of Chasséen culture in Saint-Mitre (Alpes-de-Haute-Provence).

== Genetic profile ==
An article published in 2020 provided the genetic results of several individuals buried in the Le Crès site (Béziers), ZAC Agora site (Cugnaux), and La Terrasse site (Villeneuve-Tolosane), three males had Y-chromosome haplogroup I2a1a2, where other three males had I1a2b4~, I2 and I2a1b1a2b1a2a2b1b1. From the Champ du Poste necropolis (Carcassonne), three individuals were genetically characterized, and the two Y-chromosome haplogroups found were different: G2a2a1a2a1 and H2m.

== Gallery ==
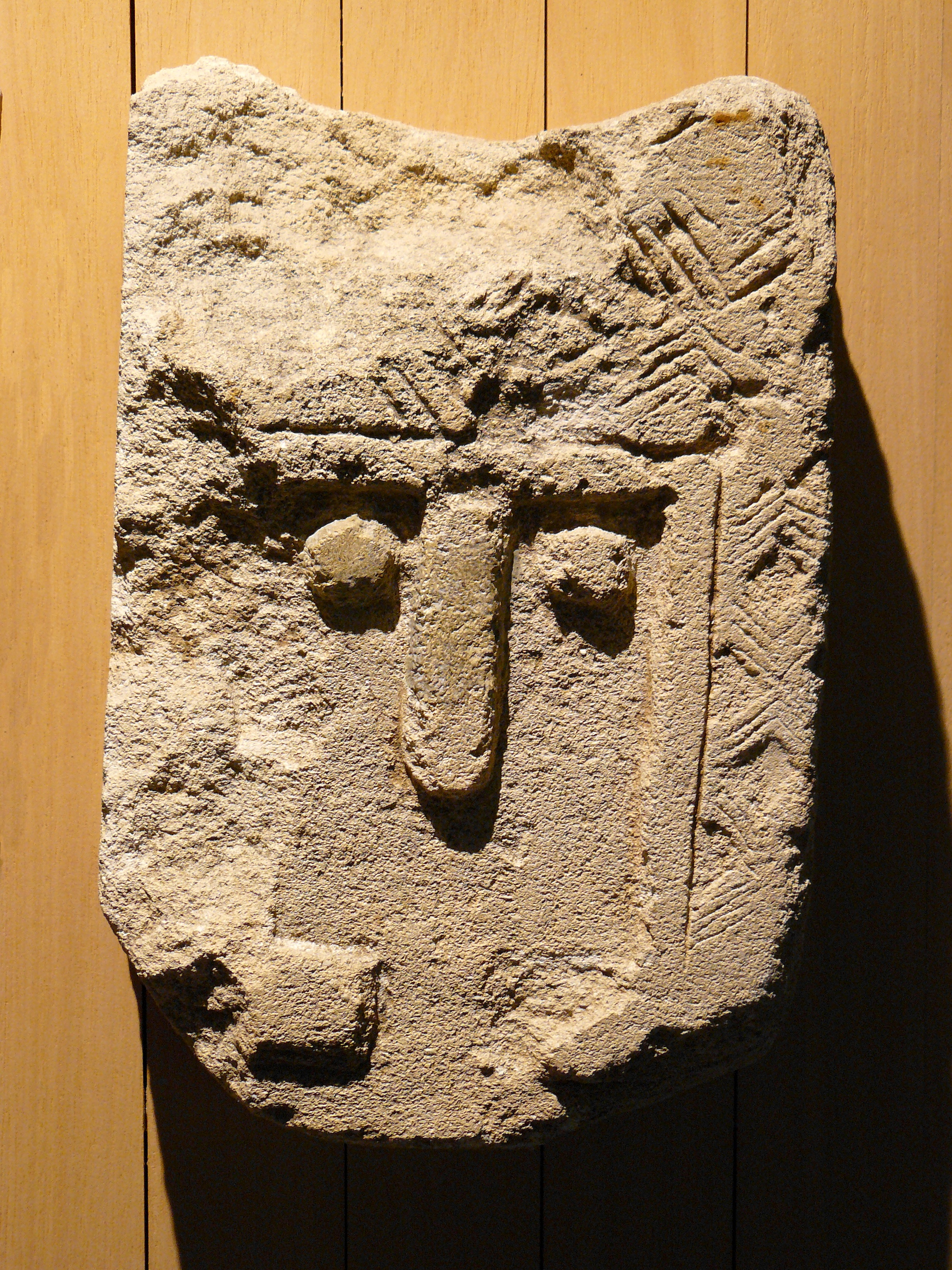
Stone stele

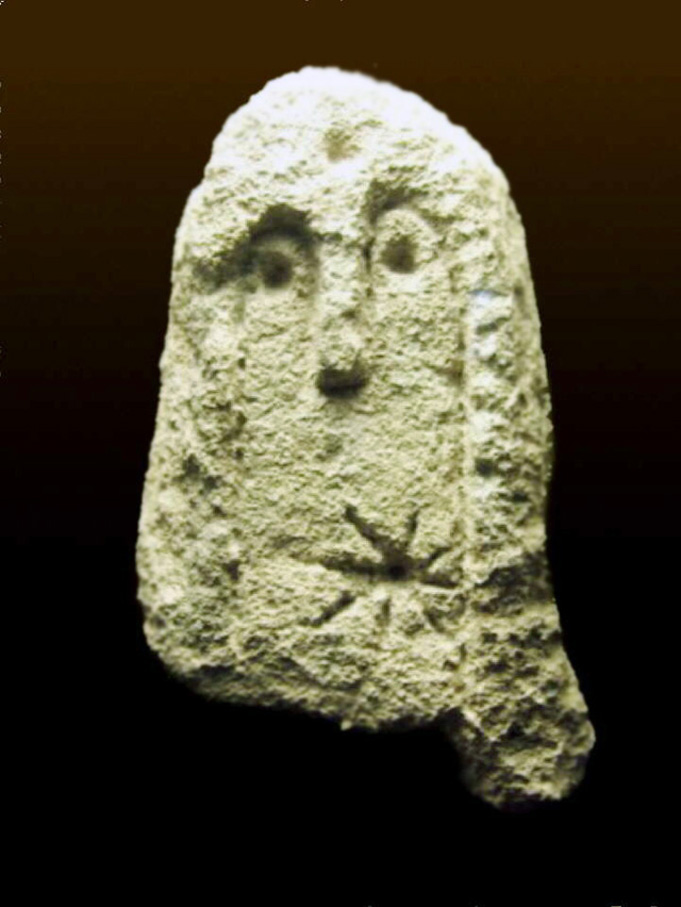
Rocher des Doms stele

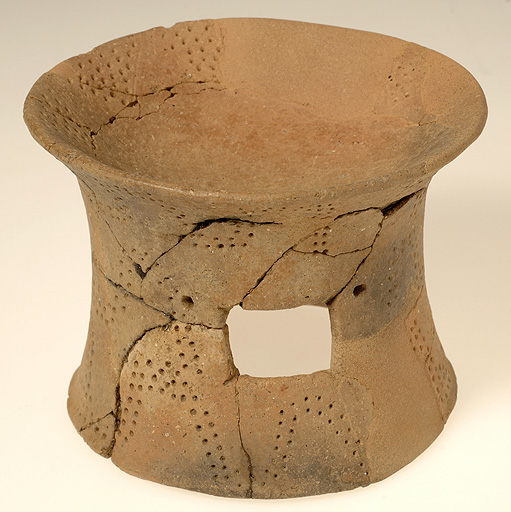
Ceramic

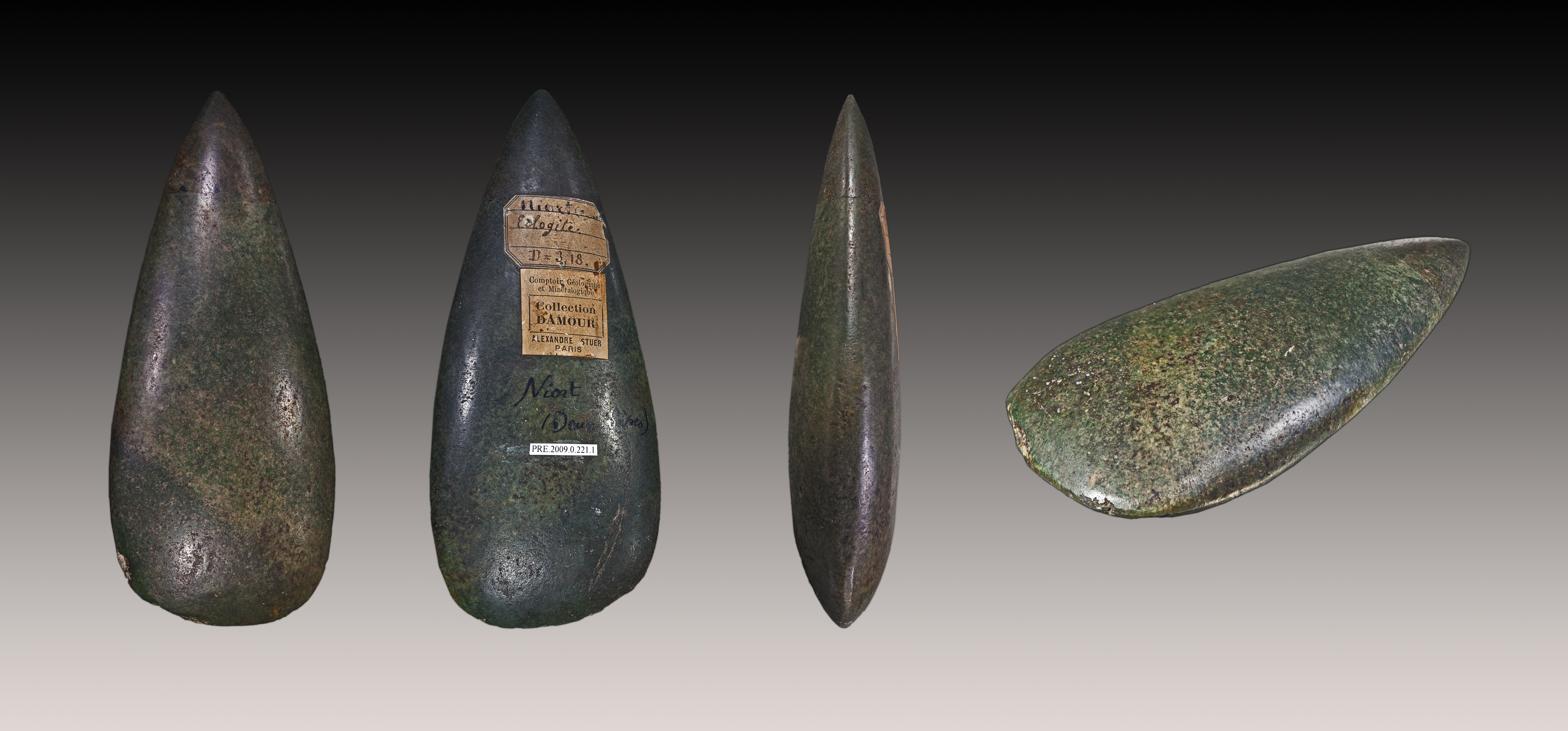
Polished stone axes

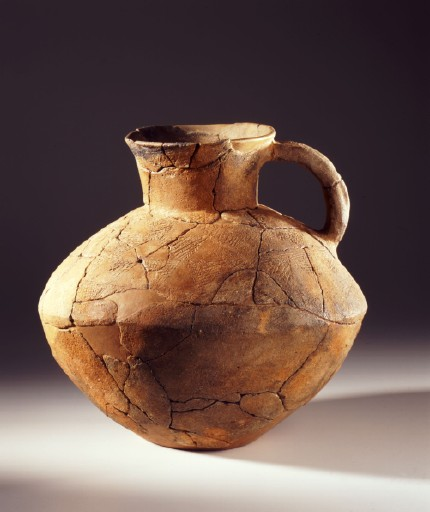
Ceramic jug, 4th millennium BC

== See also ==
- Neolithic France
- Cortaillod culture
- Chasséen-Lagozza-Cortaillod culture
- Rössen culture (4500 BC - 4000 BC)
- Funnelbeaker culture (4000 BC -2700 BC)
- Sepulcres de fossa culture (4200 BC - 3600 BC)
- Véraza culture (3400/3300 BC - 2700/2600 BC)
- Seine-Oise-Marne culture (3100BC - 2000 BC)
- Beaker culture (2800 BC - 1900 BC)
