= Canton of Argelès-sur-Mer =

Former canton of Pyrénées-Orientales, France

Coordinates: 42°32′29″N 3°01′14″E

- Former canton
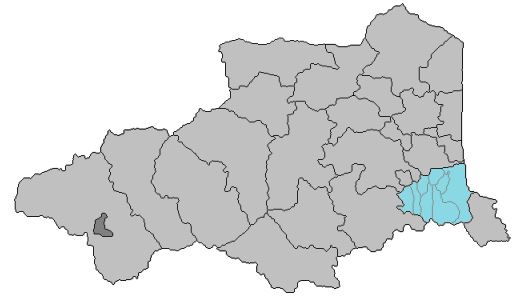
- Location of the canton in Pyrénées-Orientales
- Country: France
- Region: Occitania
- Department: Pyrénées-Orientales
- No. of communes: {{{nbcomm}}}
- Disbanded: 2015
- Area: 172.37 km^{2} (66.55 sq mi)
- Population (2012): 26,876
  - Density: 155.92/km^{2} (403.83/sq mi)

The Canton of Argelès-sur-Mer is a French former canton of Pyrénées-Orientales department, in Languedoc-Roussillon. It had 26,876 inhabitants (2012). It was disbanded following the French canton reorganisation which came into effect in March 2015.

== Composition ==
The canton of Argelès-sur-Mer consisted of 8 communes:

Name	Code INSEE	Intercommunality	Area (km^{2})	Population (last legal population)	Density (per km^{2})
Argelès-sur-Mer (seat)	66008	CC des Albères, de la Côte Vermeille et de l'Illibéris	58.67	10,279 (2014)	175
Sorède	66196	CC des Albères, de la Côte Vermeille et de l'Illibéris	34.54	3,153 (2014)	91
Saint-André	66168	CC des Albères, de la Côte Vermeille et de l'Illibéris	9.73	3,309 (2014)	340
Saint-Génis-des-Fontaines	66175	CC des Albères, de la Côte Vermeille et de l'Illibéris	9.90	2,744 (2014)	277
Palau-del-Vidre	66133	CC des Albères, de la Côte Vermeille et de l'Illibéris	10.41	3,205 (2014)	308
Laroque-des-Albères	66093	CC des Albères, de la Côte Vermeille et de l'Illibéris	20.51	2,132 (2014)	104
Villelongue-dels-Monts	66225	CC des Albères, de la Côte Vermeille et de l'Illibéris	11.55	1,608 (2014)	139
Montesquieu-des-Albères	66115	CC des Albères, de la Côte Vermeille et de l'Illibéris	17.06	1,218 (2014)	71
