= Villelongue-dels-Monts =

Villelongue-dels-Monts Vilallonga dels Monts
- Commune
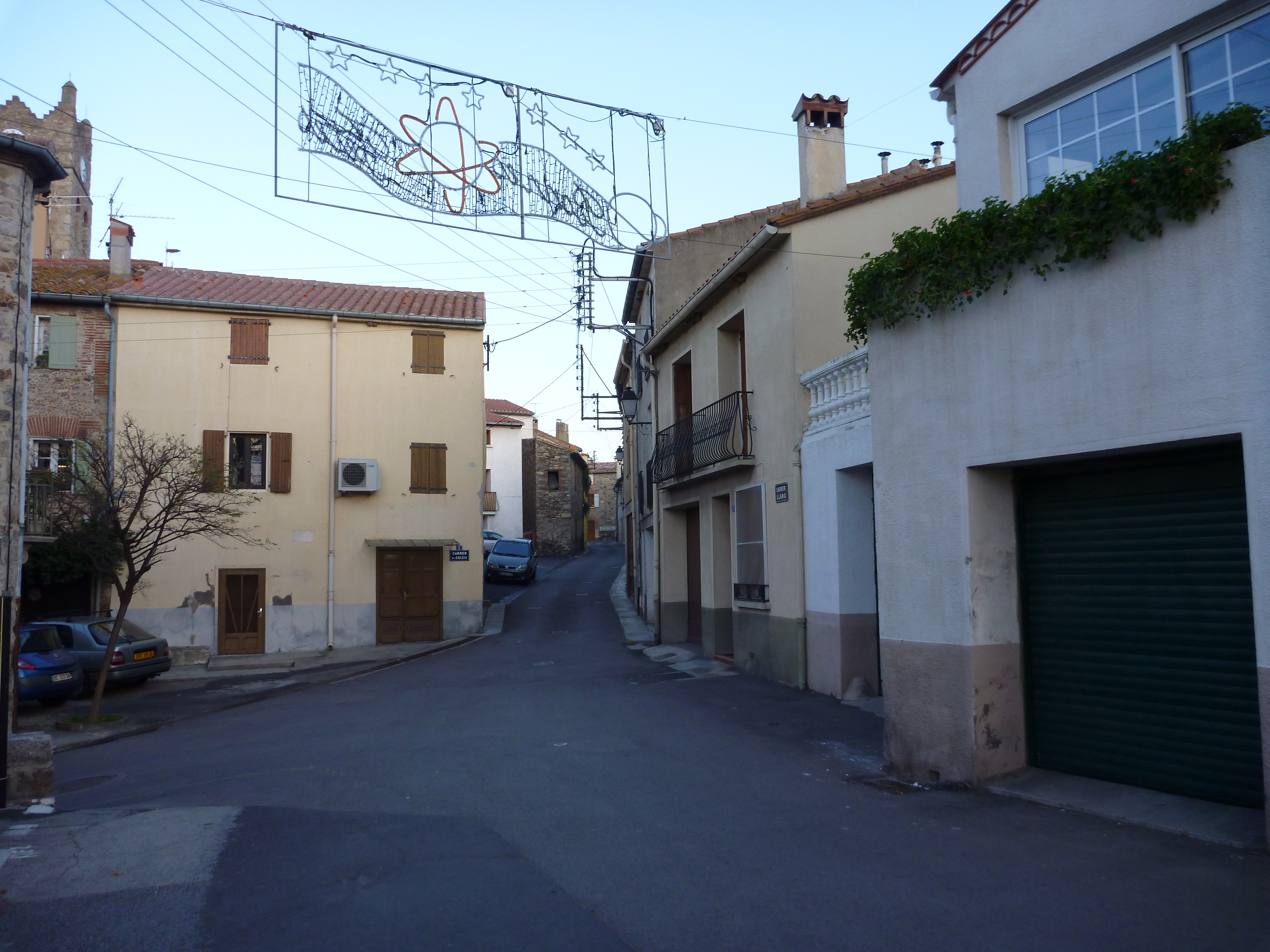
- A view within Villelongue-Dels-Monts

- Coat of arms
- Location of Villelongue-dels-Monts
- Location within France Location within Occitanie
- Coordinates: 42°31′35″N 2°54′15″E
- Country: France
- Region: Occitania
- Department: Pyrénées-Orientales
- Arrondissement: Céret
- Canton: Vallespir-Albères
- Intercommunality: CC des Albères, de la Côte Vermeille et de l'Illibéris

Government
  - Mayor (2020–2026): Christian Nifosi
- Area^{1}: 11.55 km^{2} (4.46 sq mi)
- Elevation: 117 m (384 ft)
- Highest elevation: 1,030 m (3,380 ft)
- Lowest elevation: 36 m (118 ft)
- Population (2023): 1,976
  - Density: 171.1/km^{2} (443.1/sq mi)
- Time zone: UTC+01:00 (CET)
  - Summer (DST): UTC+02:00 (CEST)
- INSEE/Postal code: 66225 /66740
- ^{1} French Land Register data, which excludes lakes, ponds, glaciers > 1 km^{2} (0.386 sq mi or 247 acres) and river estuaries.

Villelongue-dels-Monts (French pronunciation: [vil.lɔ̃ɡ dɛls mɔ̃ts]; Catalan: Vilallonga dels Monts) is a commune in the Pyrénées-Orientales department in southern France.

The inhabitants are called Villelonguais.

== Geography ==
Villelongue-dels-Monts is located in the south of the department of Pyrénées-Orientales, 33 km south of Perpignan, 18 km east from the Mediterranean Sea and 17 km from the Spanish border by Le Perthus, in the canton of Vallespir-Albères and in the arrondissement of Céret.

Its close neighbouring communities are : in the north Banyuls-dels-Aspres, Brouilla and Saint-Génis-des-Fontaines; in the east Laroque-des-Albères; in the south l'Albère and in the west Montesquieu-des-Albères.

With a surface of 1155 hectares, the territory is narrow and long (2 km from east to west and 8 km from north to south).

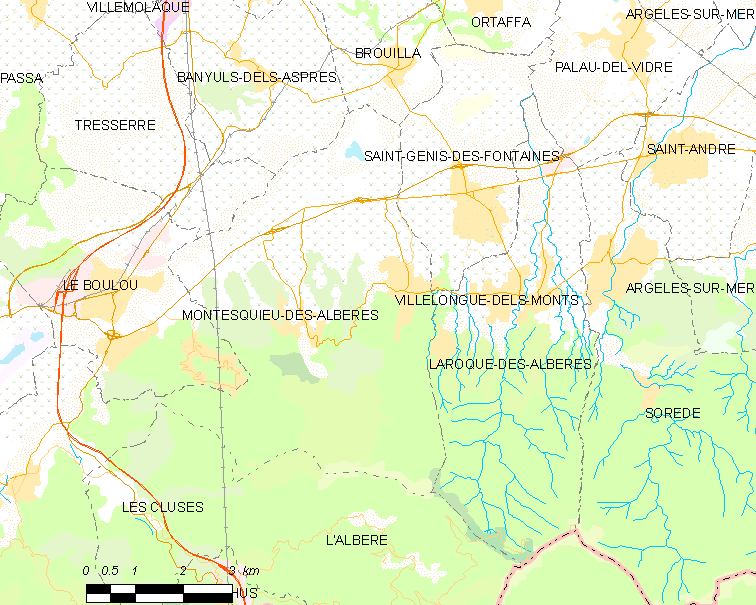
Map of Villelongue-dels-Monts and its surrounding communes

== History ==
Villelongue-dels-Monts is named after the peak above the village which means « Villelongue-du-Mont ». It was mentioned for the first time in 981. Eventually, the monastery of Saint-Génis-des-Fontaines possessed a freehold on "Villalonga". The phrase "Castrum Sancti Christophori" appeared in 1095 to indicate the fortress constructed on the rocky peak.

== Politics and administration ==
=== Mayors ===
Name	Period
Raphaël Roque	1792–1794
Sauveur Vigo	1794–1797
Antoine Portes	1797–1800
Raphaël Roque	1800–1813
Joseph Guichet	1813–1815
Joseph Ribes	1815–1821
Joseph Guichet	1821–1831
Jean Guichet	1831–1835
Louis Galangau	1835–1842
Jean Guichet	1842–1846
Saturnin Blay	1846–1848
Jean Guichet	1848–1850
Pierre Badie	1850–1851
Saturnin Blay	1851–1856
François Durand	1856–1870
Jean-Baptiste Vigo	1870–1874
François Durand	1874–1876

Name	Period
Jean-Baptiste Vigo	1876–1884
Jean Claret Guichet	1884–1888
Jean Cavaillé-Giralt	1888–1894
Pierre Cavaillé-Paris	1894–1896
Barthélemy Cavaillé	1896–1900
Louis Galangau-Jourda	1900–1907
Jean Boulet	1907–1914
Paul Portes	1914–1915
Jean Cavaillé	1915–1919
Jean Boulet	1919–1929
Antonin Monné	1929–1945
Julien Galangau	1945–1953
Robert Gazan	1953–1989
François Oms	1989–2001
Christian Nifosi	2001 -

== Demography ==
The communal demography is marked by a certain stability between 1851 and 1975, fluctuating in a minimum of population of 408 in 1968 and a maximum of 533 in 1891, and alternating between the periods of growth and decline.

From the 1970s, Villelongue-dels-Monts began to grow rapidly, related to the growth of the metropolitan area of Perpignan.

Historical population

Year	Pop.	±% p.a.
1793	278	—
1800	261	−0.90%
1806	389	+6.88%
1821	463	+1.17%
1831	487	+0.51%
1836	475	−0.50%
1841	461	−0.60%
1846	496	+1.47%
1851	521	+0.99%
1856	495	−1.02%
1861	440	−2.33%
1866	454	+0.63%
1872	450	−0.15%
1876	470	+1.09%
1881	514	+1.81%
1886	505	−0.35%
1891	533	+1.09%
1896	520	−0.49%
1901	524	+0.15%

Year	Pop.	±% p.a.
1906	512	−0.46%
1911	506	−0.24%
1921	508	+0.04%
1926	508	+0.00%
1931	506	−0.08%
1936	503	−0.12%
1946	456	−0.98%
1954	528	+1.85%
1962	437	−2.34%
1968	408	−1.14%
1975	513	+3.33%
1982	749	+5.56%
1990	831	+1.31%
1999	1,069	+2.84%
2007	1,327	+2.74%
2012	1,483	+2.25%
2017	1,706	+2.84%
2023	1,976	+2.48%

Source: EHESS and INSEE (1968-2023)

== Sites of interest ==
- Santa Maria del Vilar
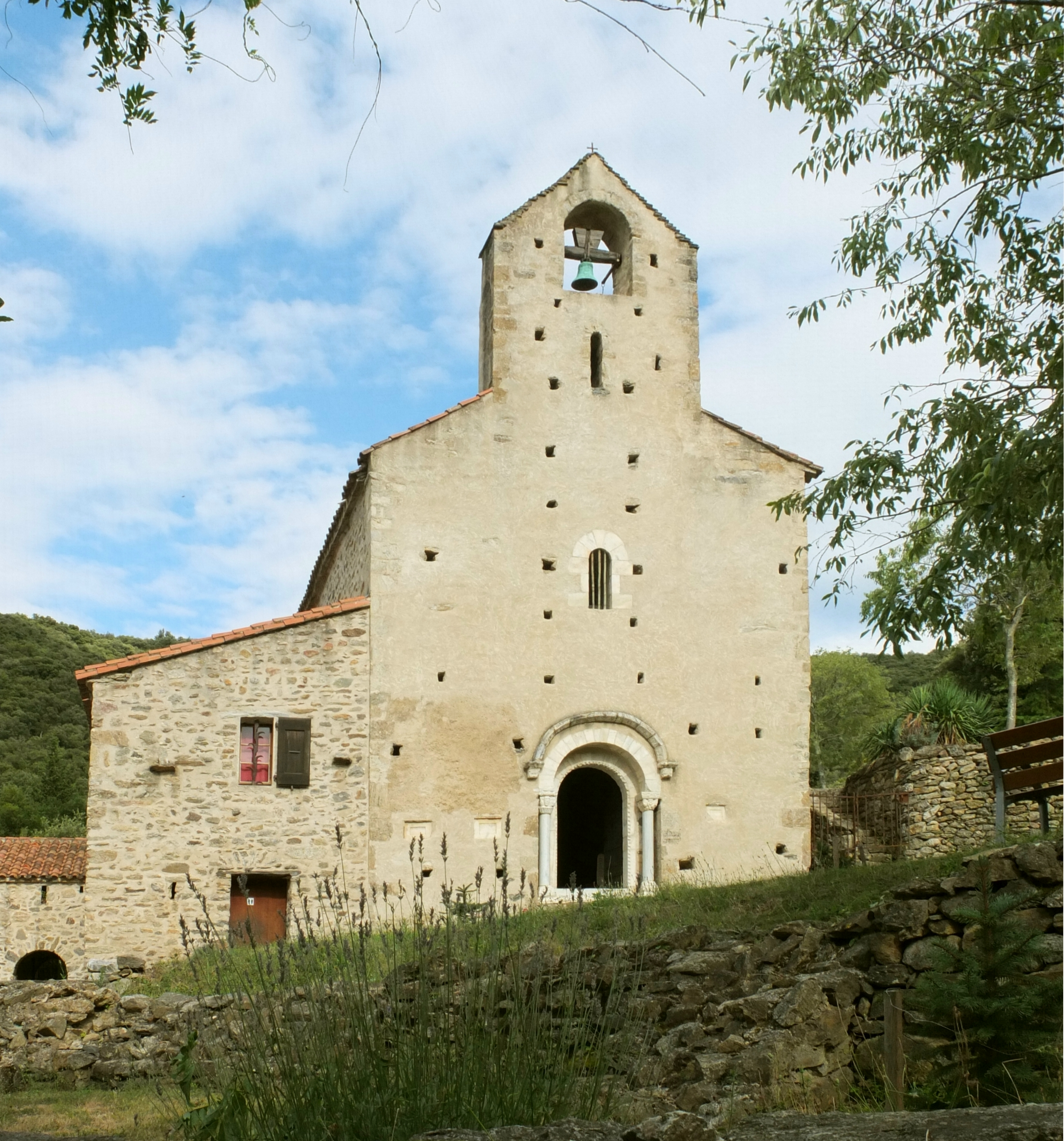
Santa Maria del Vilar

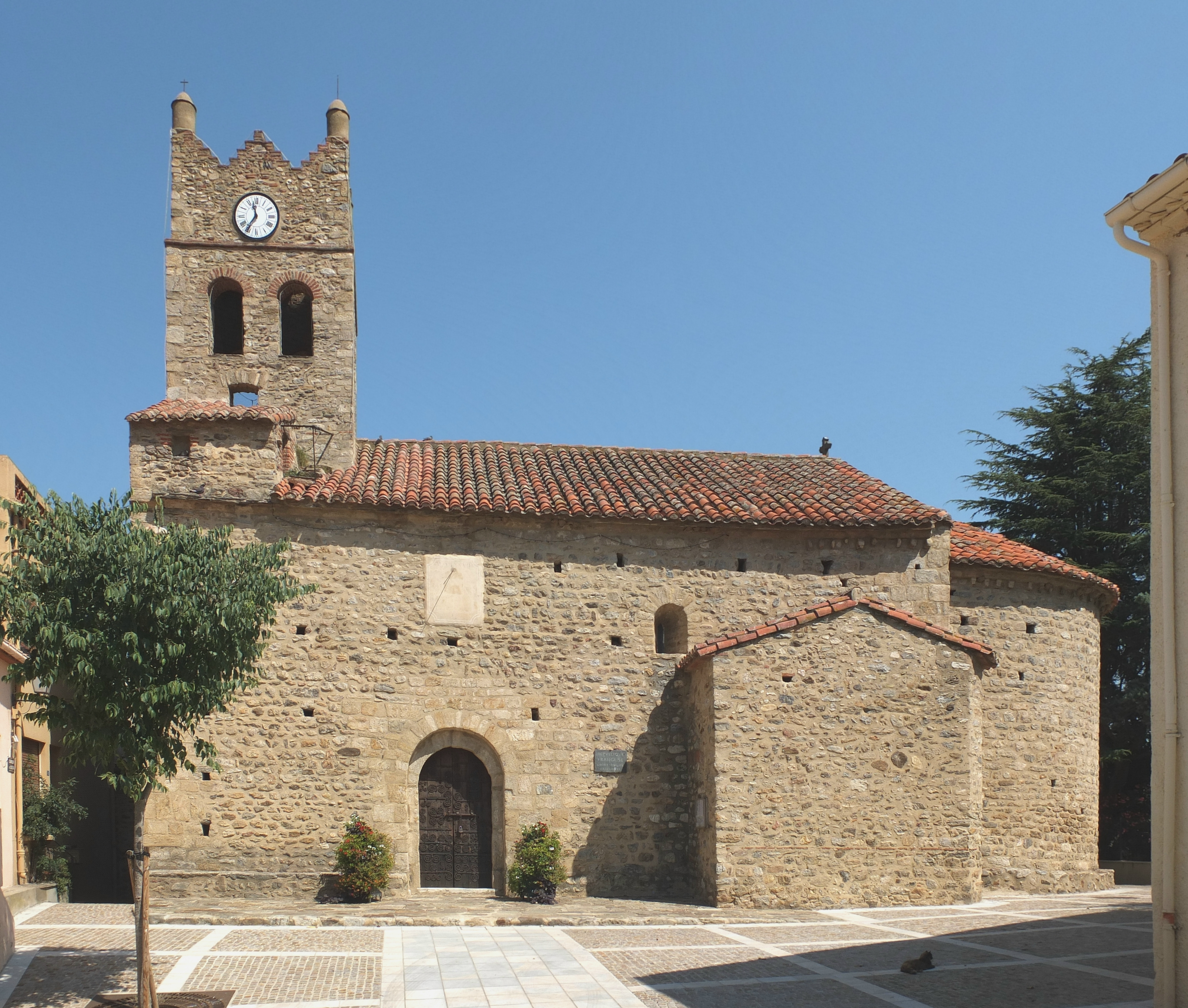
Église Saint-Étienne

== See also ==
- Communes of the Pyrénées-Orientales department
