= Canton of Vallespir-Albères =

Coordinates: 42.4892°N 2.7522°E

The Canton of Vallespir-Albères is a French canton of Pyrénées-Orientales department, in Occitanie. At the French canton reorganisation which came into effect in March 2015, the canton was created including 8 communes from the canton of Céret and 5 from the canton of Argelès-sur-Mer.

== Composition ==
- L'Albère
- Le Boulou
- Céret
- Les Cluses
- Laroque-des-Albères
- Maureillas-las-Illas
- Montesquieu-des-Albères
- Le Perthus
- Saint-Génis-des-Fontaines
- Saint-Jean-Pla-de-Corts
- Sorède
- Villelongue-dels-Monts
- Vivès
