= Vivès =

Vivès Vivers
- Commune
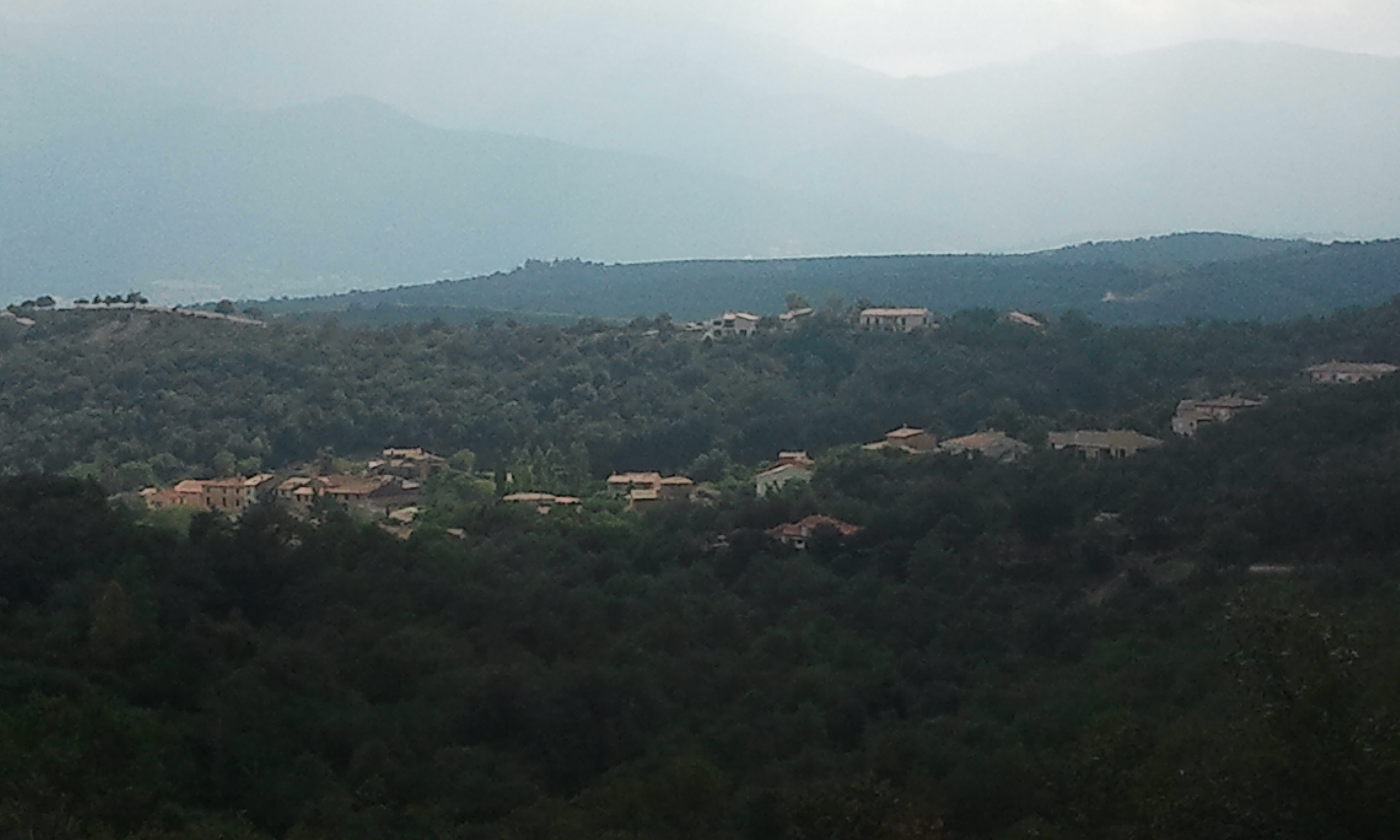
- A general view of Vivès

- Coat of arms
- Location of Vivès
- Location within France Location within Occitanie
- Coordinates: 42°31′46″N 2°45′52″E
- Country: France
- Region: Occitania
- Department: Pyrénées-Orientales
- Arrondissement: Céret
- Canton: Vallespir-Albères
- Intercommunality: Vallespir

Government
  - Mayor (2020–2026): Jacques Arnaudiès
- Area^{1}: 11.07 km^{2} (4.27 sq mi)
- Elevation: 228 m (748 ft)
- Highest elevation: 323 m (1,060 ft)
- Lowest elevation: 114 m (374 ft)
- Population (2023): 190
  - Density: 17/km^{2} (44/sq mi)
- Time zone: UTC+01:00 (CET)
  - Summer (DST): UTC+02:00 (CEST)
- INSEE/Postal code: 66233 /66490
- ^{1} French Land Register data, which excludes lakes, ponds, glaciers > 1 km^{2} (0.386 sq mi or 247 acres) and river estuaries.

Vivès (French pronunciation: [vivɛs]; Catalan: Vivers, [biˈβeɾs], [biˈβes]) is a commune in the department of Pyrénées-Orientales, Occitania, southern France.

== Geography ==
Vivès is located in the canton of Vallespir-Albères and in the arrondissement of Céret.

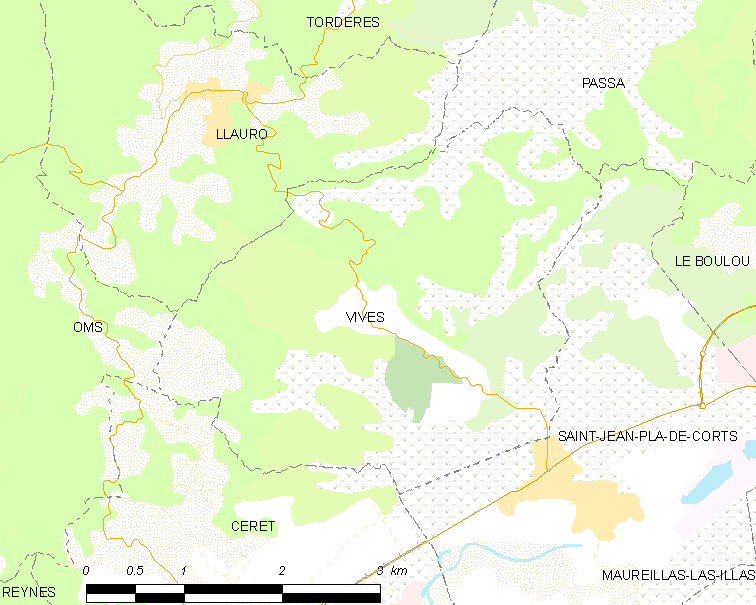
Map of Vivès and its surrounding communes

== Population and society ==
=== Demography ===
Historical population
Year	Pop.	±% p.a.
1968	73	—
1975	58	−3.23%
1982	60	+0.49%
1990	75	+2.83%
1999	128	+6.12%
2007	163	+3.07%
2012	172	+1.08%
2017	176	+0.46%
2023	190	+1.28%
Source: INSEE

=== Education ===
The school of Vivès had about 20 children in 1947 and only 8 in 1966, the year it was closed. Since then, the nearest school is in Saint-Jean-Pla-de-Corts.

=== Health ===
The village of Vivès seems to have benefited, at least until the beginning of the twentieth century, from a local family of healers, renowned through the whole department of Pyrénées-Orientales.

There are no doctors nor any pharmacy in Vivès nowadays, the nearest being in Saint-Jean-Pla-de-Corts. The nearest clinic is in Céret and the nearest public hospital is in Perpignan.

== Famous Personages from Vives ==
Bl. Thomas of Vives, a Mercedarian Friar of the Sovereign and Royal Order of Our Lady of Mercy, who was imprisoned at Tunis, Tunisia in 1329, and executed by being stoned on 14 March 1324 for the crime of blaspheming the name of Muhammed. His portrait can be found at Cagliari, in Sardinia. He is considered a Saint in his order.

== See also ==
- Communes of the Pyrénées-Orientales department
