= Les Cluses =

- Commune
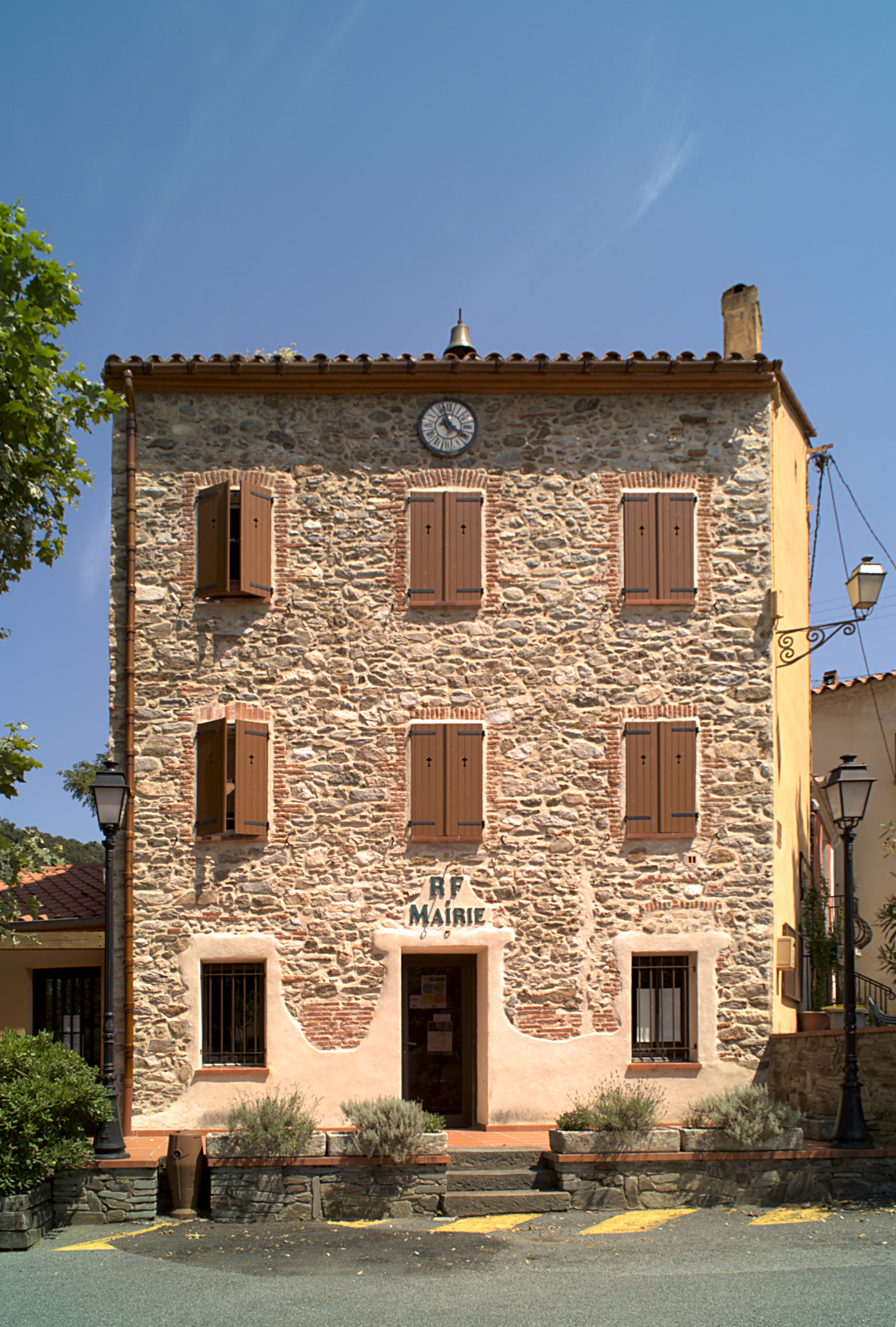
- The town hall in Les Cluses
- Location of Les Cluses
- Location within France Location within Occitanie
- Coordinates: 42°29′13″N 2°50′21″E
- Country: France
- Region: Occitania
- Department: Pyrénées-Orientales
- Arrondissement: Céret
- Canton: Vallespir-Albères
- Intercommunality: Vallespir

Government
  - Mayor (2020–2026): Alexandre Puignau
- Area^{1}: 8.91 km^{2} (3.44 sq mi)
- Highest elevation: 368 m (1,207 ft)
- Lowest elevation: 103 m (338 ft)
- Population (2023): 282
  - Density: 31.6/km^{2} (82.0/sq mi)
- Demonym: Clusiens
- Time zone: UTC+01:00 (CET)
  - Summer (DST): UTC+02:00 (CEST)
- INSEE/Postal code: 66063 /66400
- ^{1} French Land Register data, which excludes lakes, ponds, glaciers > 1 km^{2} (0.386 sq mi or 247 acres) and river estuaries.

Les Cluses (French pronunciation: [le klyz], before 1984: L'Ecluse) is a commune in the Pyrénées-Orientales department in southern France.

== Geography ==
=== Localisation ===
Les Cluses is located in the canton of Vallespir-Albères and in the arrondissement of Céret.

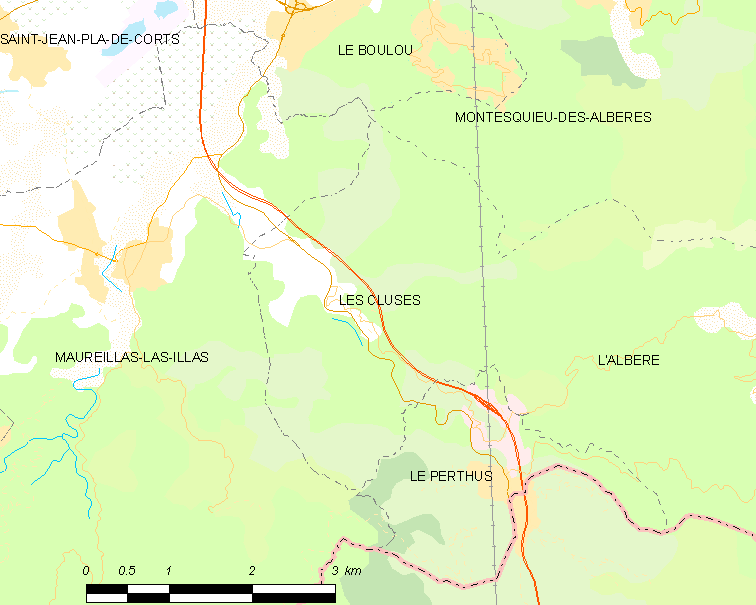
Map of Les Cluses and its surrounding communes

== Population ==
Historical population
Year	Pop.	±% p.a.
1968	67	—
1975	115	+8.02%
1982	148	+3.67%
1990	165	+1.37%
1999	219	+3.20%
2007	243	+1.31%
2012	260	+1.36%
2017	242	−1.42%
2023	282	+2.58%
Source: INSEE

== See also ==
- Communes of the Pyrénées-Orientales department
