= Priory of Santa Maria del Vilar =

Priory in Pyrénées-Orientales, France

Coordinates: 42°30′36″N 2°54′19″E

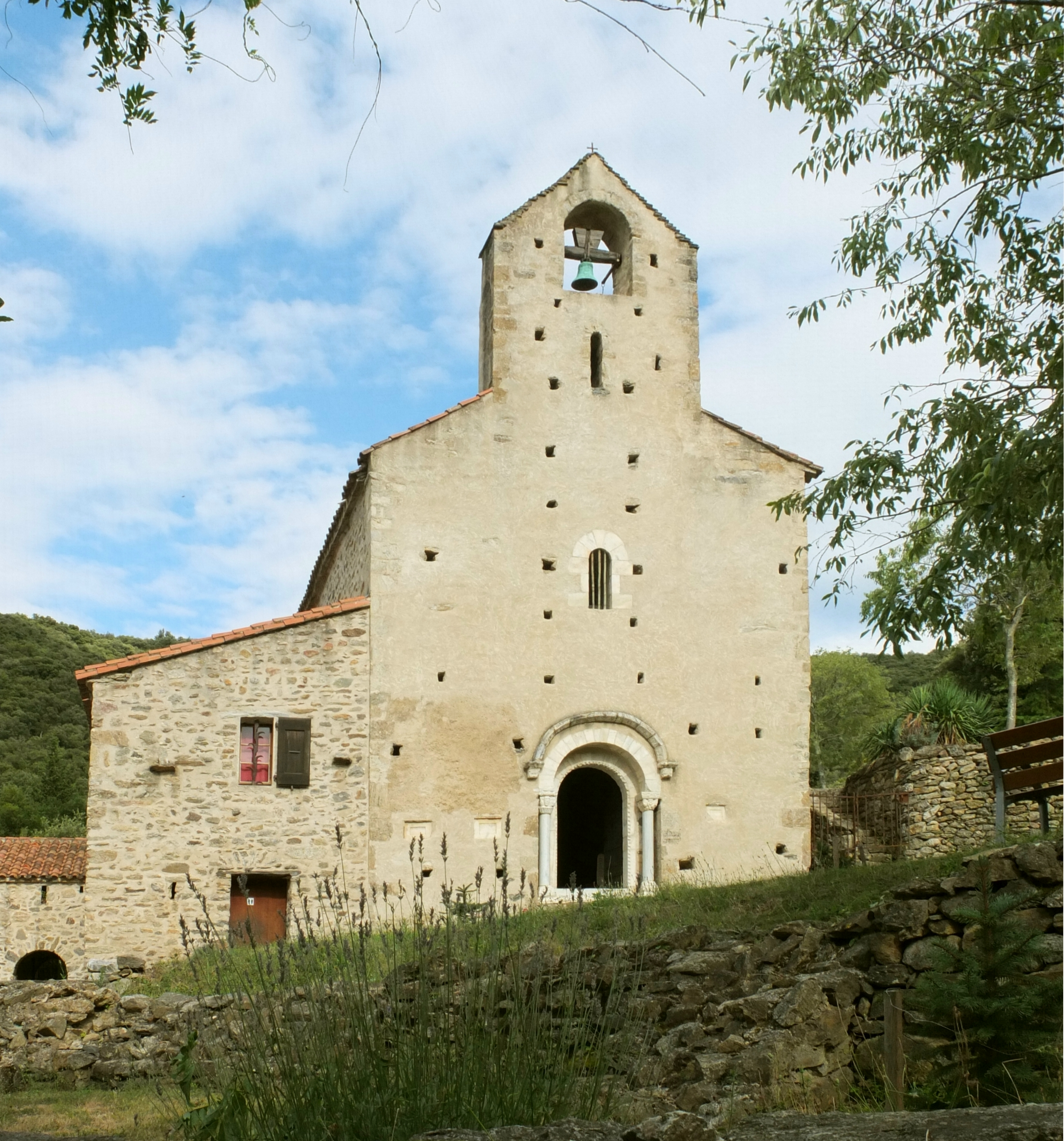
Church of the monastery

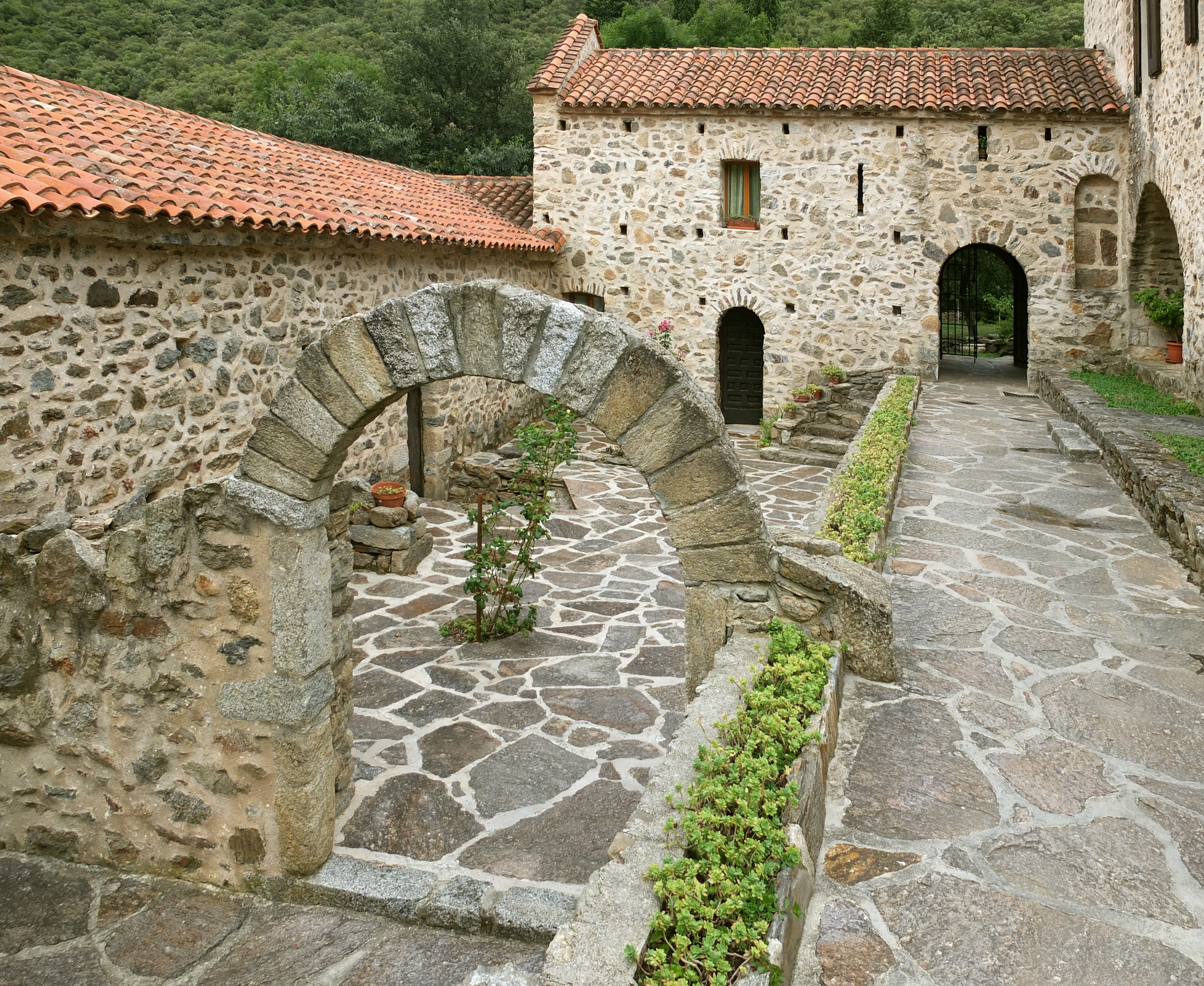
The convent building

The Priory of Santa Maria del Vilar at Villelongue-dels-Monts in the department of the Pyrénées-Orientales, France, houses the Romanian Orthodox Monastery of the Dormition of the Mother of God. It falls under the jurisdiction of the Romanian Orthodox Metropolitan of Western and Southern Europe.

== History ==
Its former hegumen was Father Timotei Lauran, now bishop of Spain and Portugal under the jurisdiction of the Romanian Orthodox Metropolitan of Western and Southern Europe.
