= Saint-Génis-des-Fontaines Abbey =

Abbey in Saint-Genis-des-Fontaines, France

Coordinates: 42°32′36″N 2°55′19″E

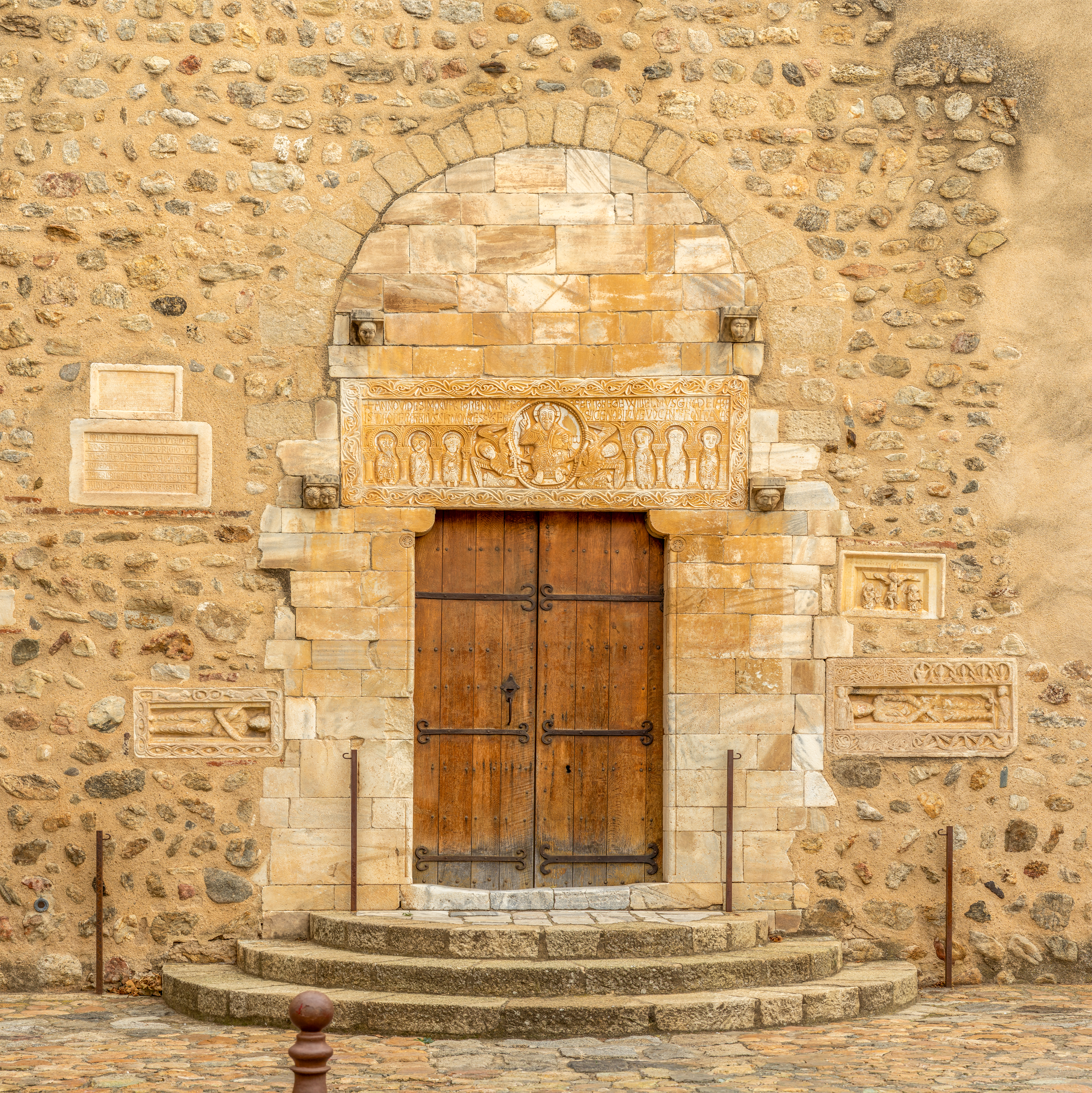
Façade of the abbey

Saint-Génis-des-Fontaines Abbey (Catalan: Monestir de Sant Genís de Fontanes) is a Benedictine abbey in Saint-Génis-des-Fontaines, Pyrénées-Orientales, France. It was dedicated to Saint Genesius and Saint Michael, to whom the surviving church is still dedicated.

== History ==
The monastery is recorded for the first time in 819, in a document mentioning its abbot, Sentimir. Plundered and destroyed, it was rebuilt by order of King Lothair of France in 981.

Later it came under the protection of the Counts of Roussillon and later of the Kings of Aragon. The abbey church was enlarged and re-consecrated in 1153. In the 13th century it gained a marble cloister on the north-eastern side. Subsequently the abbey declined, and in 1507 was united with Montserrat Abbey.

During the French Revolution, the monks were expelled and the complex divided between several owners. The church was reopened to worship in 1846, as the village's parish church dedicated to Saint Michael. The cloister, which had been dismantled and sold, was bought back and re-installed in its original location in the 1980s.

== Architecture ==
The abbey church was most likely built at the same time as the original monastery, in the 8th century. Of the original church there remain some of the foundation structures, which show its plan to have included a main apse and two deep side apses, with a long transept.

The 1153 enlargement, with the addition of the vaulted ceiling over the transept and nave, led to the reconstruction of the walls in order to support the additional weight of the roof vaults. The ceilings of the apses were also modified and decorated with frescoes, of which only a few traces remain today. The church kept the Latin Cross plan typical of Romanesque architecture, with a nave, transept and three apses. In the 17th century the church was enriched with Baroque altars.

The exterior has two bell towers from different ages. The larger one is located next to the transept and nave. The façade has several Romanesque sculptures and tombstones of monks and local notables. The main portal has an architrave with bas-reliefs commissioned by abbot Guillaume and realized in 1020-21 in white marble from Céret. In the middle is portrayed Christ in majesty in a mandorla, supported by two archangels and flanked by two groups of three figures under arcades of Mozarabic horseshoe arches, over which to either side of the mandorla is the inscription ANNO VIDESIMO QUARTO RENNATE ROTBERTO REGE WILIELMUS GRATIA ABA ISTA OPERA FIERI IUSSIT IN ONORE SANCTI GENESII CENOBII QUE VOCANT FONTANES, which translates to "In the twenty-fourth year of the reign of King Robert, William, by the grace [of God] abbot, ordered this work to be made in honour of Saint Genesius the hermit, which is called Fontanes." The 24th year of the reign of King Robert II of France was 1020-21. A similar sculpture, perhaps by the same artist, is also present in the Abbey of St. Andrew, 4 km from Saint-Génis-des-Fontaines Abbey.

The Christ in Majesty is an Apocalyptic theme that became a common icon depicted in church portals beginning in the early eleventh century in Catalonia. Throughout the eleventh century, people in northern Spain and southern France were exposed to Apocalyptic iconography through widely circulated manuscripts such as the Commentary on the Apocalypse by Beatus of Liébana. The Saint-Génis lintel of Christ and the apostles is the oldest, preserved architectural example of sculpted Apocalyptic iconography. Prior to the dissemination of eleventh century manuscripts, the iconography of Christ in Majesty can be traced to ancient images of the enthroned ruler. The image of Christ in Majesty set above the portal of the Church is an appropriate choice of iconography as it reminds humble worshippers that they are entering God's home. As a result of the Saint-Génis lintel, such visual manifestations of God in the eyes of humans or theophany started to appear on almost every church building. The apostles, set into Mozarabic horseshoe arches, are reminiscent of early Christian sarcophagi in their occupation of architectural space; however, the Saint-Génis figures are purely decorative in their two-dimensionality and do not conform to principles of natural form or space. In contrast to sculptors who were more concerned with placing material beings in a three-dimensional space, the Saint-Génis artist created a sculpture that corresponded more closely with ancient relics or altar frontals. Ultimately, the Saint-Génis lintel was a springboard in the tradition of architectural sculpture and by the twelfth century, such portal carvings became a standard feature of church entrances and facades.

The cloister was built in the 13th century, and was already completed in 1271. It has been supposed that a cloister existed here before, which would be the one depicted near the figures in the portal architrave, but no traces of it remain. The capitals supporting the 13th century cloister are in late Romanesque style. It has been suggested that they could originally have been painted.

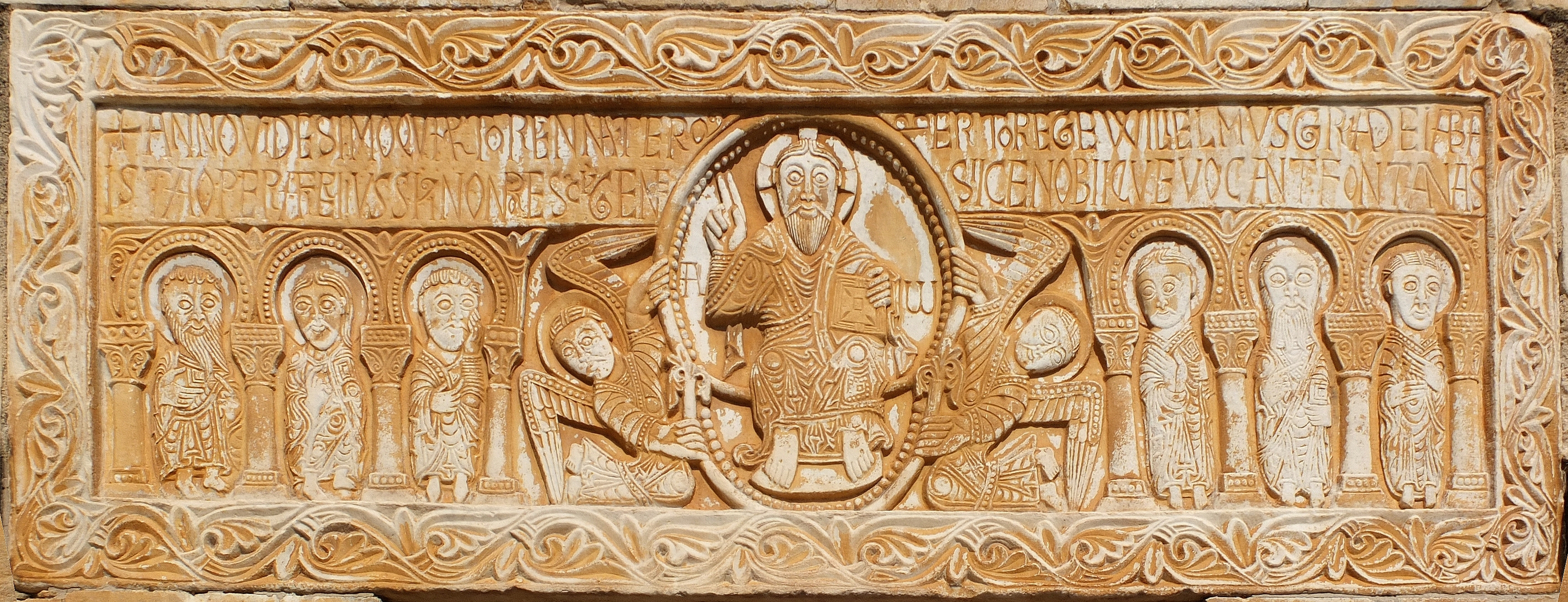
Lintel 11th ctry.

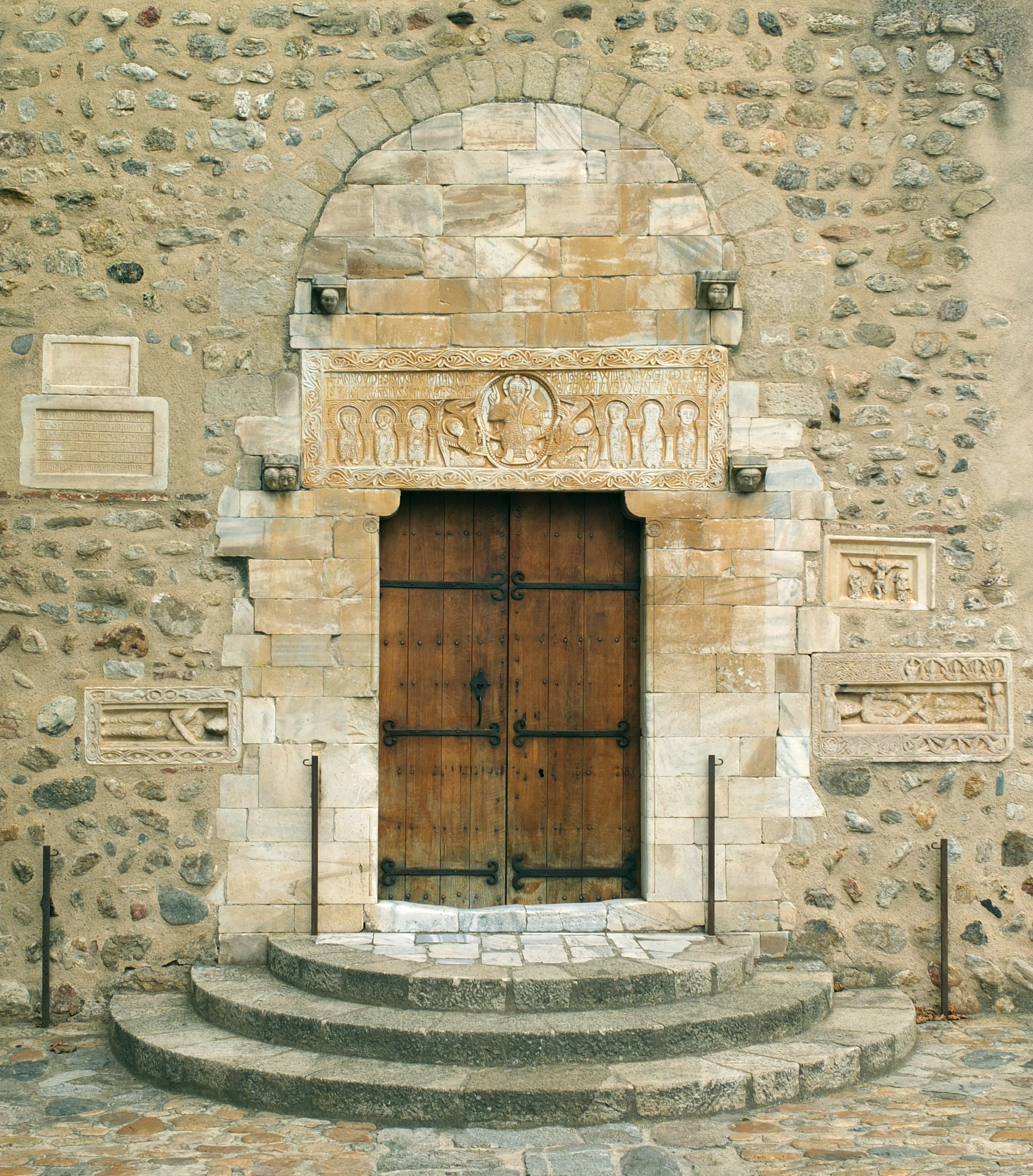
Main portal with sculpted architrave

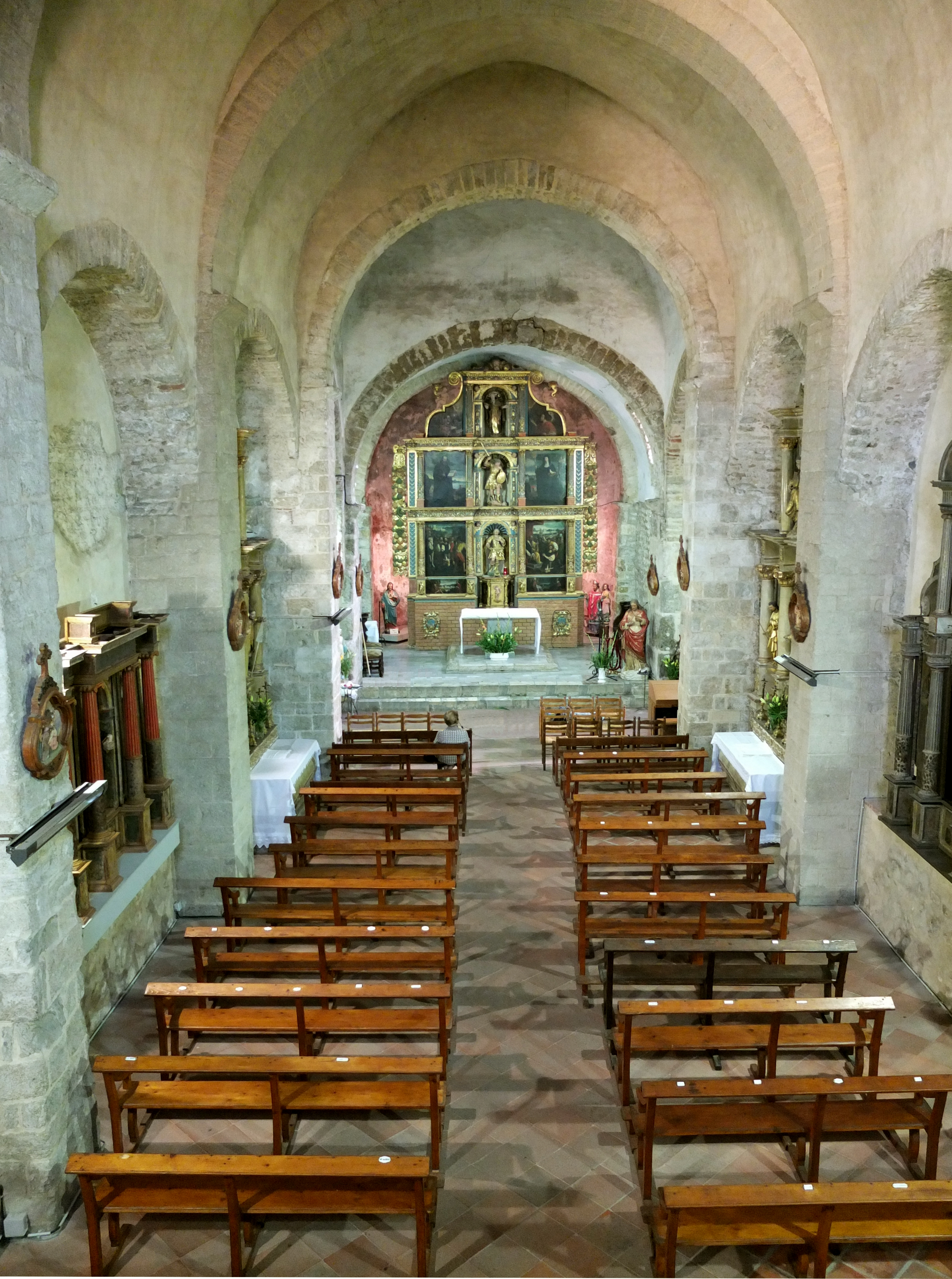
Nave

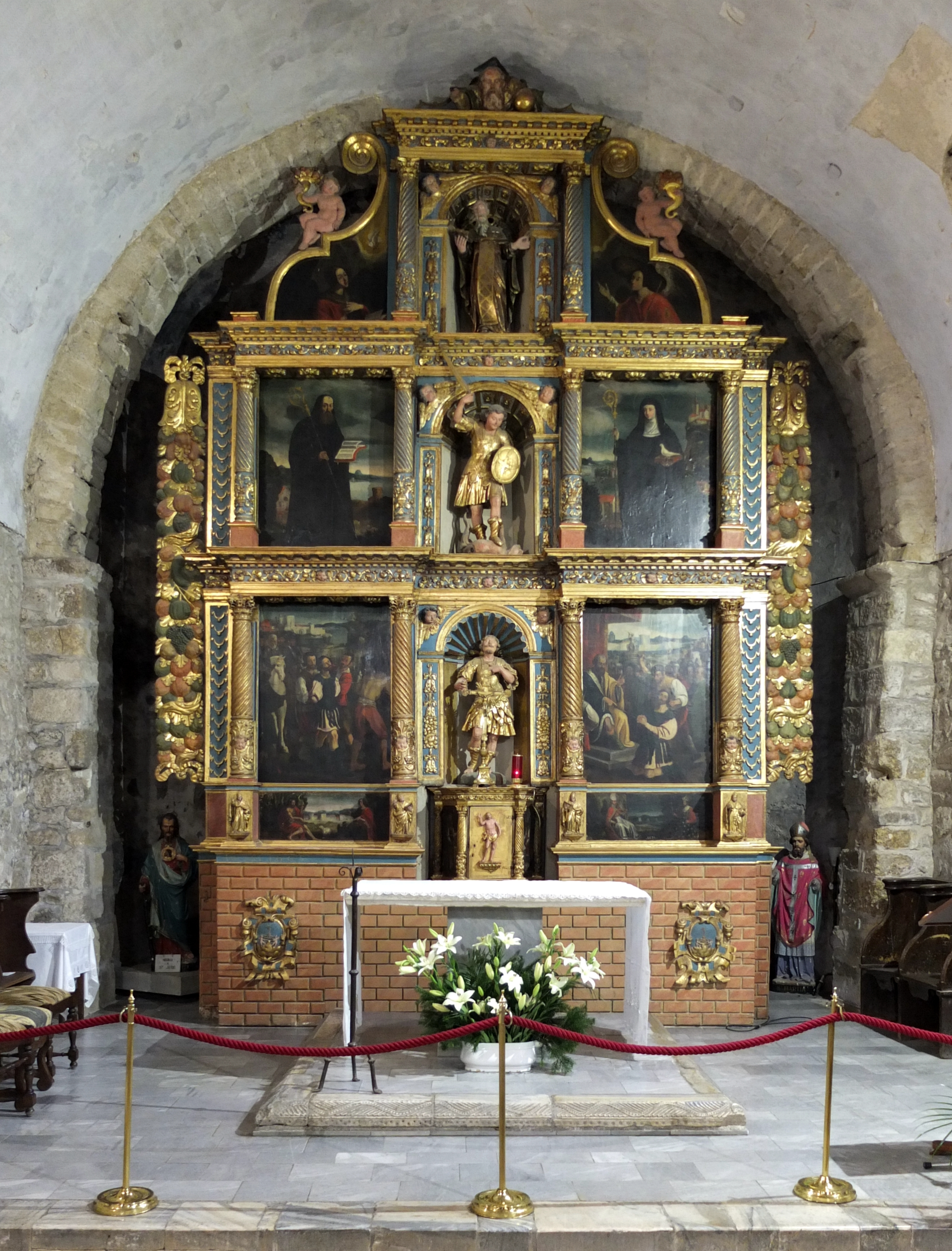
Main altar

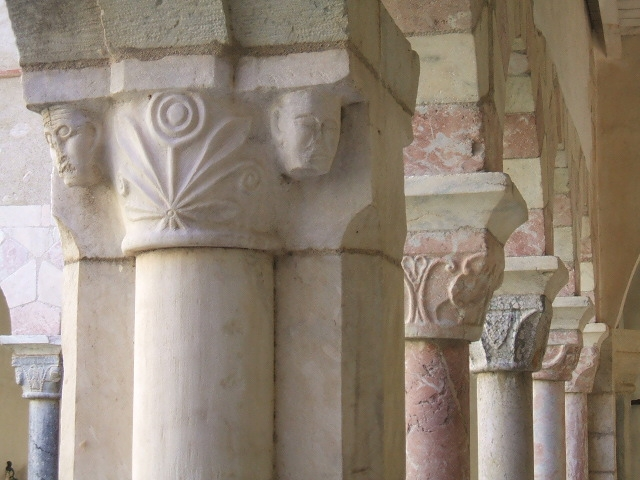
Sculpted capitals in the cloister

== See also ==
- French Romanesque architecture

== Sources ==
- Boulet, Louis (2000). L'abbaye romane de Sant-Genis que l'on dit "des Fontanes". La Mandorle.
