= Communauté de communes des Albères, de la Côte Vermeille et de l'Illibéris =

French community of communes

The Communauté de communes des Albères, de la Côte Vermeille et de l'Illibéris (CC ACVI) is a community of communes in the Pyrénées-Orientales department in the Occitanie region in southern France.

== History ==
The Community of Communes of Albères and Côte Vermeille was created by order of the Prefect of the Pyrénées-Orientales dated December 26, 2006, as of January 1, 2007. It is the result of the merger of the Albères community of municipalities and the Côte Vermeille community of municipalities. The new entity includes 12 communes and just over 40,000 inhabitants.

On 1 January 2014, the community of municipalities of the Illibéris sector was dissolved and integrated into the Community of Municipalities of Albères and Côte Vermeille, integrating the municipalities of Bages and Ortaffa and bringing the number of municipalities to 14. The municipality of Elne also joined the structure.

In 2016, the statutes were amended to change the name to Communauté de communes des Albères, de la Côte Vermeille et de l'Illibéris.
