= Saint-Jean-Pla-de-Corts =

- Commune
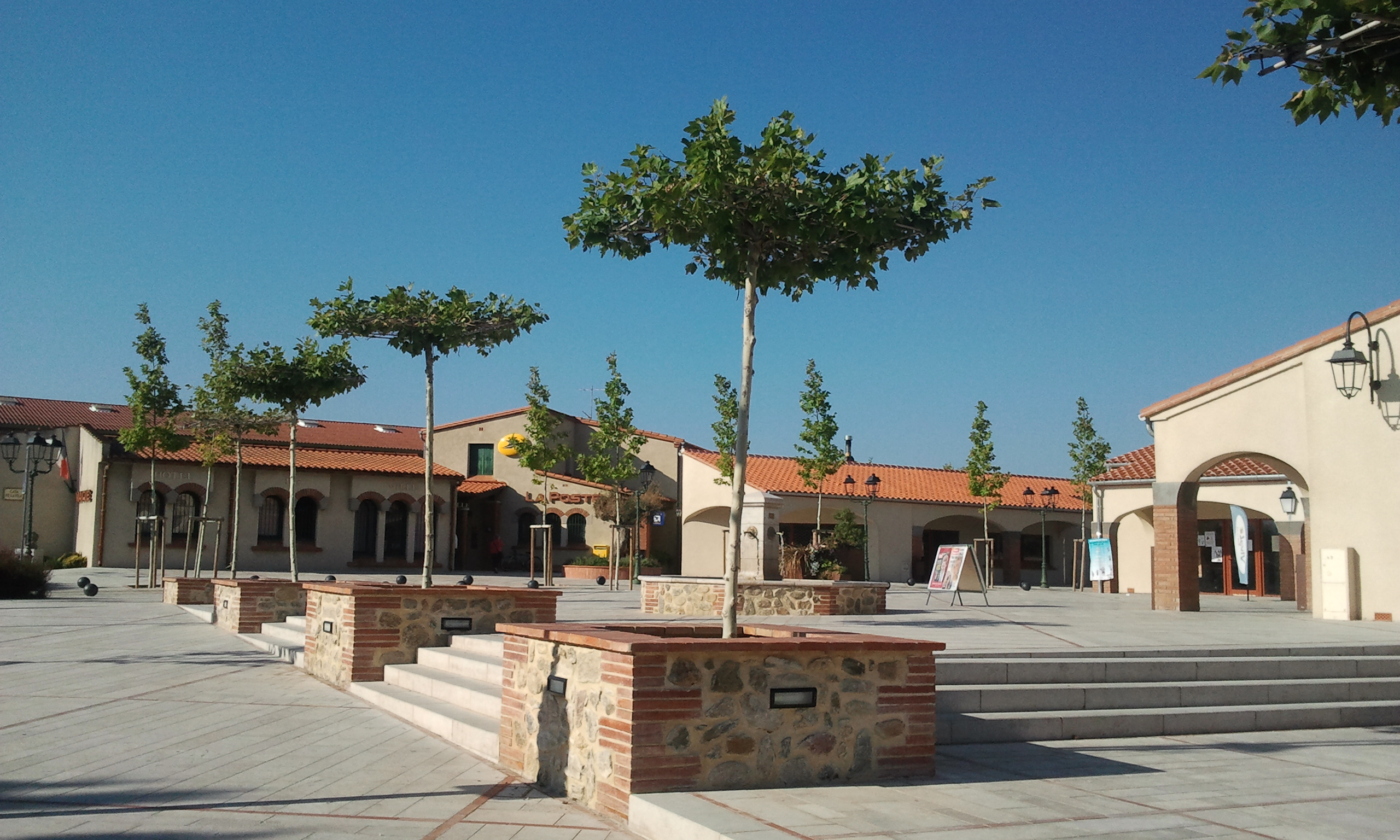
- Guy Malé Square, in Saint-Jean-Pla-de-Corts
- Location of Saint-Jean-Pla-de-Corts
- Location within France Location within Occitanie
- Coordinates: 42°30′43″N 2°47′34″E
- Country: France
- Region: Occitania
- Department: Pyrénées-Orientales
- Arrondissement: Céret
- Canton: Vallespir-Albères
- Intercommunality: Vallespir

Government
  - Mayor (2020–2026): Robert Garrabe
- Area^{1}: 10.62 km^{2} (4.10 sq mi)
- Elevation: 116 m (381 ft)
- Highest elevation: 208 m (682 ft)
- Lowest elevation: 71 m (233 ft)
- Population (2023): 2,311
  - Density: 217.6/km^{2} (563.6/sq mi)
- Time zone: UTC+01:00 (CET)
  - Summer (DST): UTC+02:00 (CEST)
- INSEE/Postal code: 66178 /66490
- ^{1} French Land Register data, which excludes lakes, ponds, glaciers > 1 km^{2} (0.386 sq mi or 247 acres) and river estuaries.

Saint-Jean-Pla-de-Corts (French pronunciation: [sɛ̃ ʒɑ̃ pla də kɔʁ]; Catalan: Sant Joan de Pladecorts) is a commune in the Pyrénées-Orientales department in southern France.

== Geography ==
Saint-Jean-Pla-de-Corts is located in the canton of Vallespir-Albères and in the arrondissement of Céret.

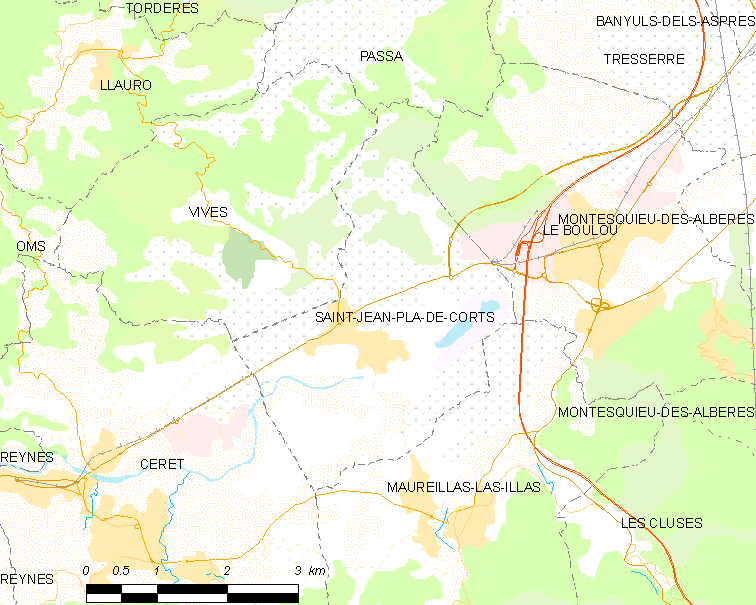
Map of Saint-Jean-Pla-de-Corts and its surrounding communes

== Population ==
Historical population
Year	Pop.	±% p.a.
1968	743	—
1975	906	+2.87%
1982	1,040	+1.99%
1990	1,456	+4.30%
1999	1,775	+2.23%
2007	1,965	+1.28%
2012	2,045	+0.80%
2017	2,218	+1.64%
2023	2,311	+0.69%
Source: INSEE

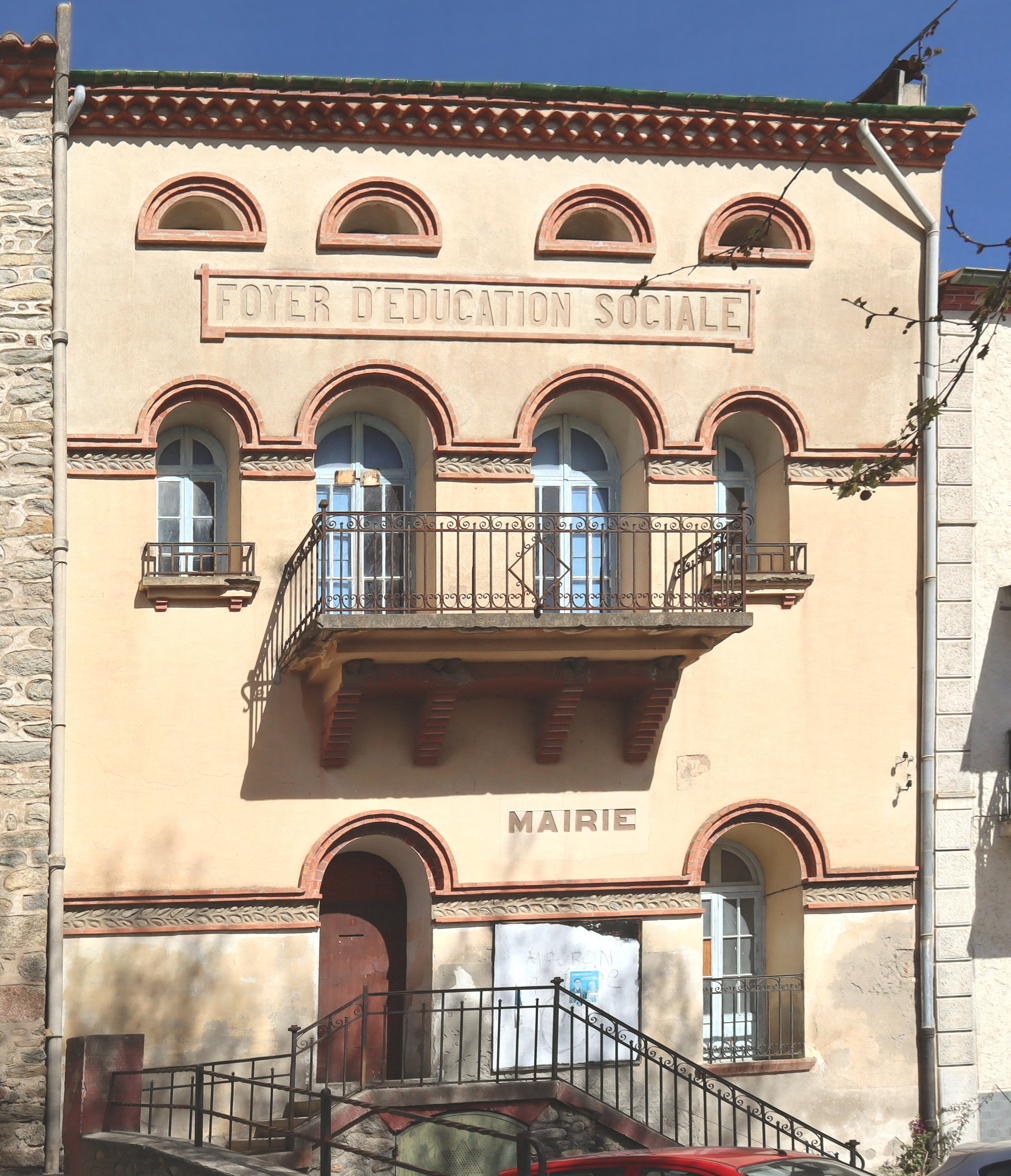
Ancient town hall

== See also ==
- Communes of the Pyrénées-Orientales department
