= Laroque-des-Albères =

- Commune
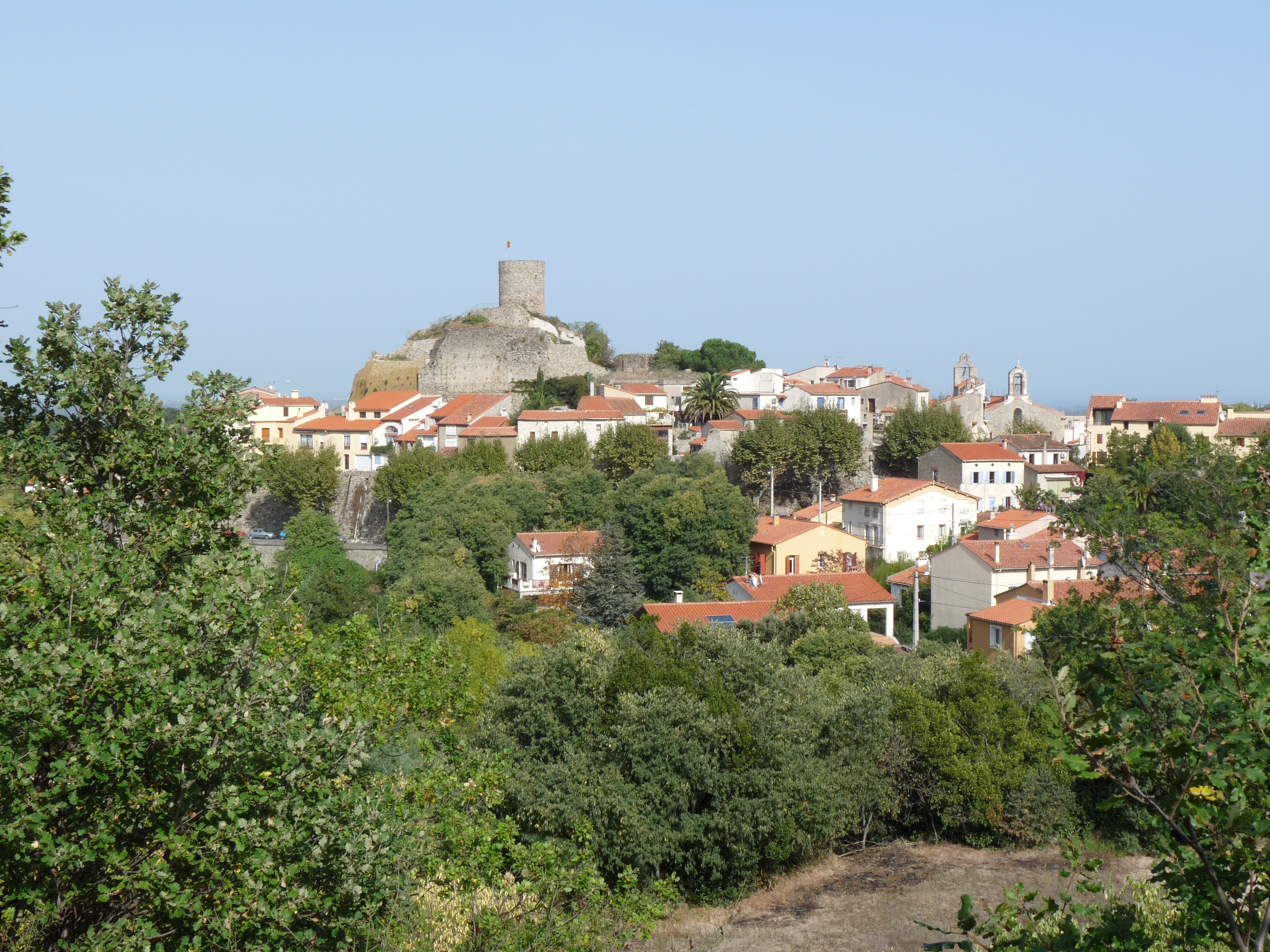
- A general view of Laroque-des-Albères

- Coat of arms
- Location of Laroque-des-Albères
- Location within France Location within Occitanie
- Coordinates: 42°31′26″N 2°55′58″E
- Country: France
- Region: Occitania
- Department: Pyrénées-Orientales
- Arrondissement: Céret
- Canton: Vallespir-Albères

Government
  - Mayor (2026–32): Gérard Pujol
- Area^{1}: 20.51 km^{2} (7.92 sq mi)
- Elevation: 110 m (360 ft)
- Highest elevation: 1,245 m (4,085 ft)
- Lowest elevation: 42 m (138 ft)
- Population (2023): 2,256
  - Density: 110.0/km^{2} (284.9/sq mi)
- Time zone: UTC+01:00 (CET)
  - Summer (DST): UTC+02:00 (CEST)
- INSEE/Postal code: 66093 /66740
- ^{1} French Land Register data, which excludes lakes, ponds, glaciers > 1 km^{2} (0.386 sq mi or 247 acres) and river estuaries.

Laroque-des-Albères (French pronunciation: [la ʁɔk de.z‿albɛʁ]; Catalan: La Roca d'Albera) is a commune in the Pyrénées-Orientales department in southern France.

It is part of the Occitanie region. The town is in the foothills of the Pyrénées mountains.

== Geography ==
=== Localisation ===
Laroque-des-Albères is located in the canton of Vallespir-Albères and in the arrondissement of Céret.

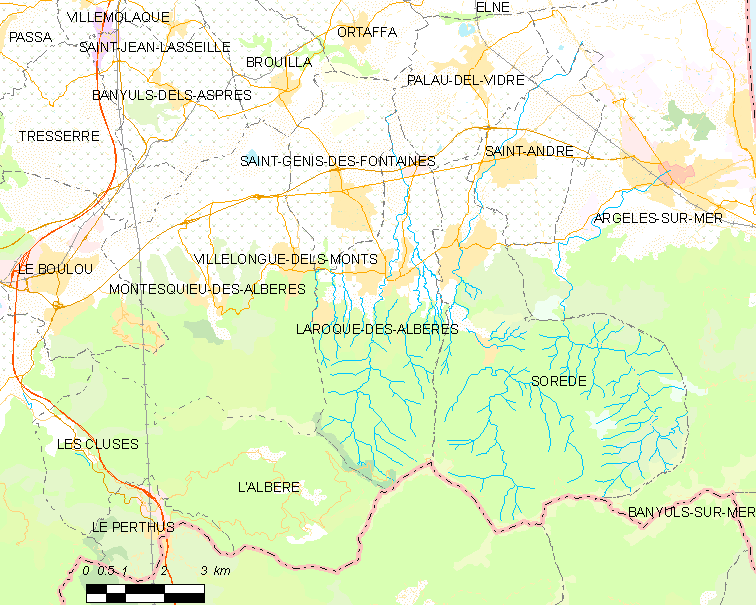
Map of Laroque-des-Albères and its surrounding communes

== Government and politics ==
=== Mayors ===
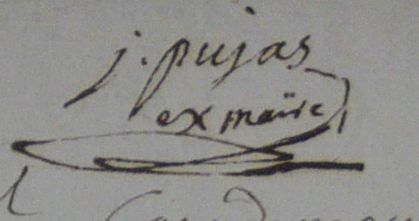
Signature of the former mayor Joseph Pujas on 8 June 1815

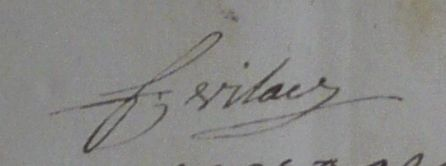
Signature of the new mayor François Vilar on 8 June 1815

Mayor	Term start	Term end
François Olibo	1792	1796
Jean Poch	1796	1800
Joseph Gaspa	1800	1802
Joseph Pujas	1802	8 June 1815
François Vilar	8 June 1815	?
Joseph Pujas	?	1816
Joseph Malzach	1816	1827
Hyacinthe Carboneill	1827	1830
François Barate	1830	1831
Jacques Montoriol	1831	1831
Martin Fourcade	1831	1834
Blaise Roger	1834	1837
Jean Montoriol	1837	1840
Hyacinthe Carboneill	1840	1841
Jean Oursoul	1841	1846
Paul Vilar	1846	1848
Jean Chaubet	1848	1848
Pierre Vilar	1848	1850
Joseph Chaubet	1850	1854
Paul Vilar	1854	1854
Joseph Montoriol	1854	1855
Louis Malzach	1855	1857
Raymond Vassal	1857	1860
Jacques Cisque	1860	1862
Pierre Vilar	1862	1869
Louis Malzach	1869	1970
Théophile Vilar	1870	1871
Martin Durand	1871	1874
Joseph Malzach	1874	1876
Théophile Vilar	1876	1876
Joseph Molins	1876	1879
Joseph Cantuern	1879	1881
Jean Caurignac	1881	1882
Hyacinthe Oursol	1882	1882
Baptiste Pagès	1882	1888
Théophile Vilar	1888	1893
Pierre Vilar	1893	1904
Michel Bosch	1904	1910
Joseph Cantuern	1910	1913
Louis Solé	1913	1928
Joseph Carboneill	1928	1941
Étienne Courp	1941	1944
Louis Solé	1944	1959
François Domenjo	1959	1965
Fernand Soler	1965	1983
Sébastien Martinez	1983	1989
Pierre Romengas	1989	March 1995
Maryse Armada	March 1995	March 2008
Jean-Pierre Bagate	March 2008	September 2008 (resigned)
Christian Nauté	October 2008	March 2026
Gérard Pujol	March 2026	

== Population ==
Historical population
Year	Pop.	±% p.a.
1968	831	—
1975	984	+2.44%
1982	1,126	+1.94%
1990	1,508	+3.72%
1999	1,909	+2.65%
2007	1,968	+0.38%
2012	2,148	+1.77%
2017	2,112	−0.34%
2023	2,256	+1.11%
Source: INSEE

== Sites of interest ==
- The castle (12th century), one of the finest examples of incastellamento in the area.
- Puig Neulós
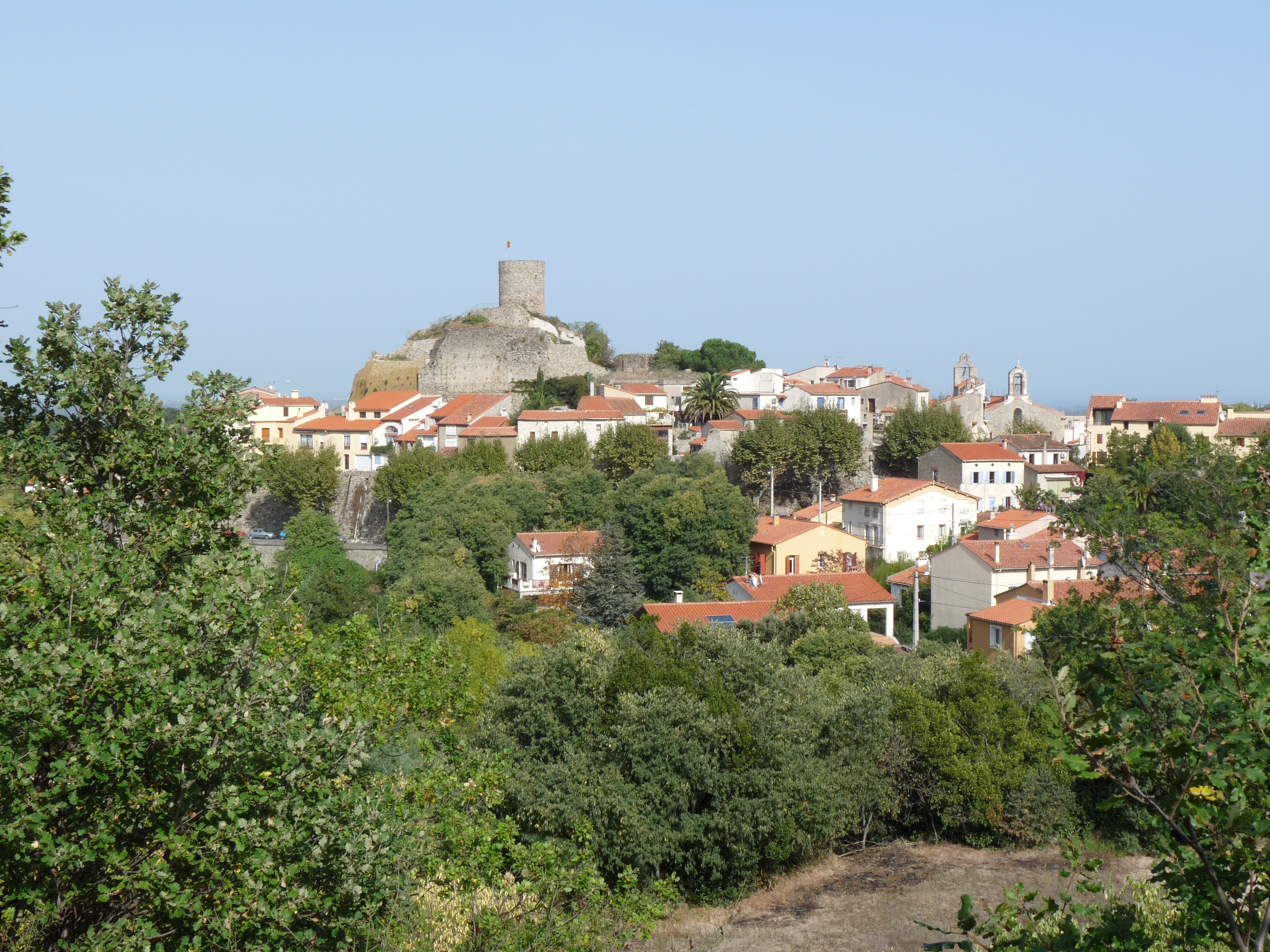
General view of the village

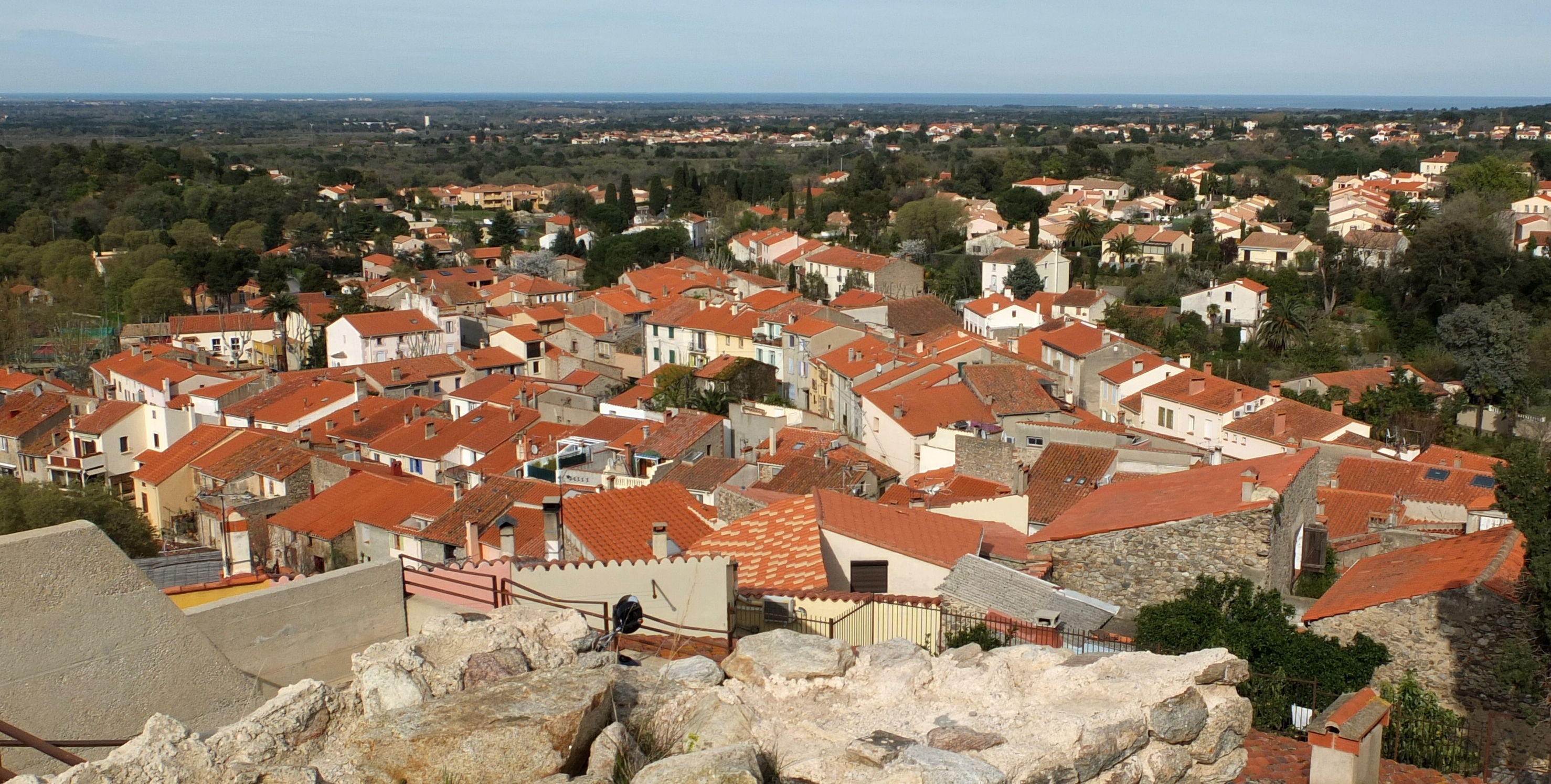
The village seen from the castle

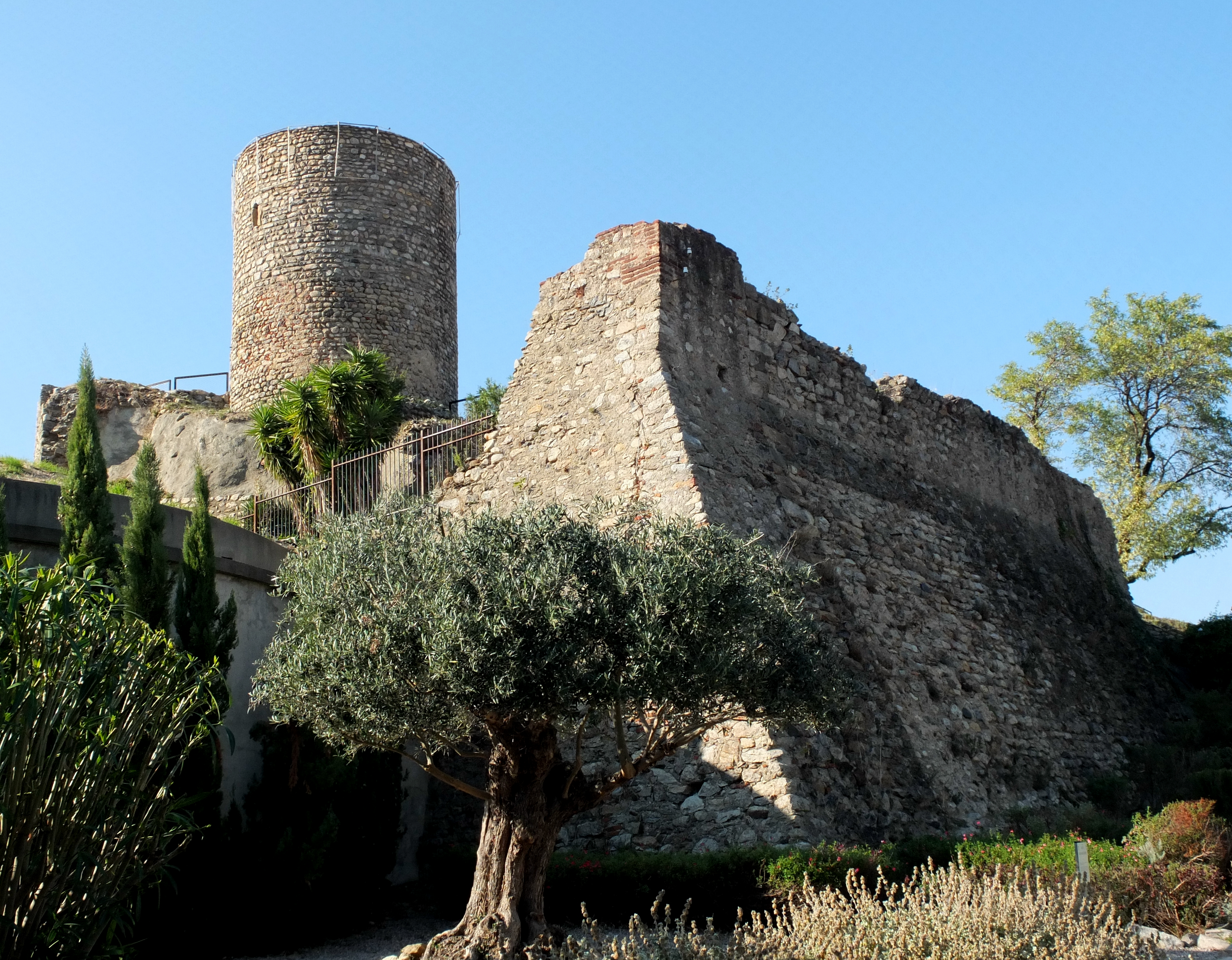
The castle, 12th century (view southwest)

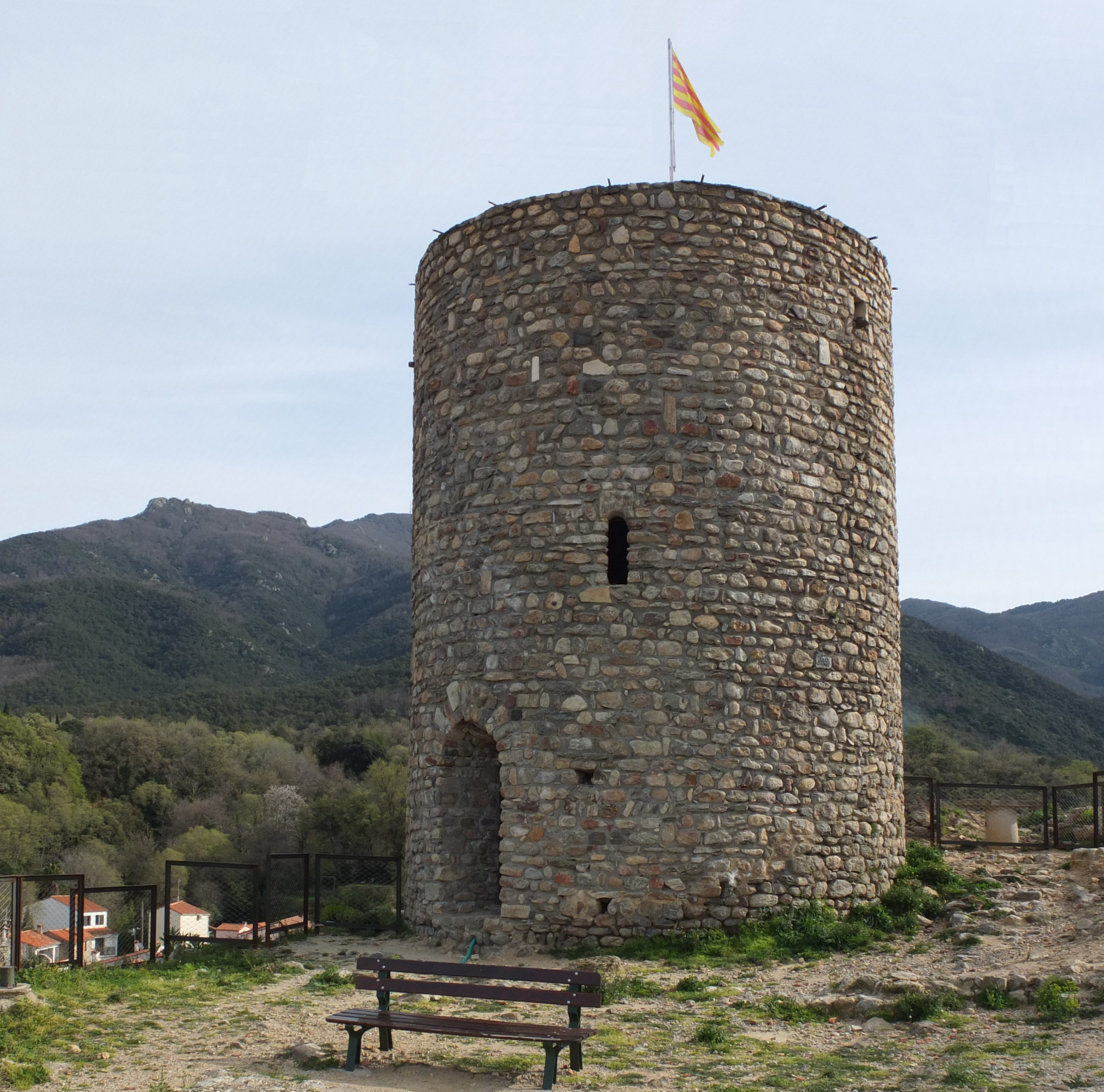
The tower of the castle (view northwest)

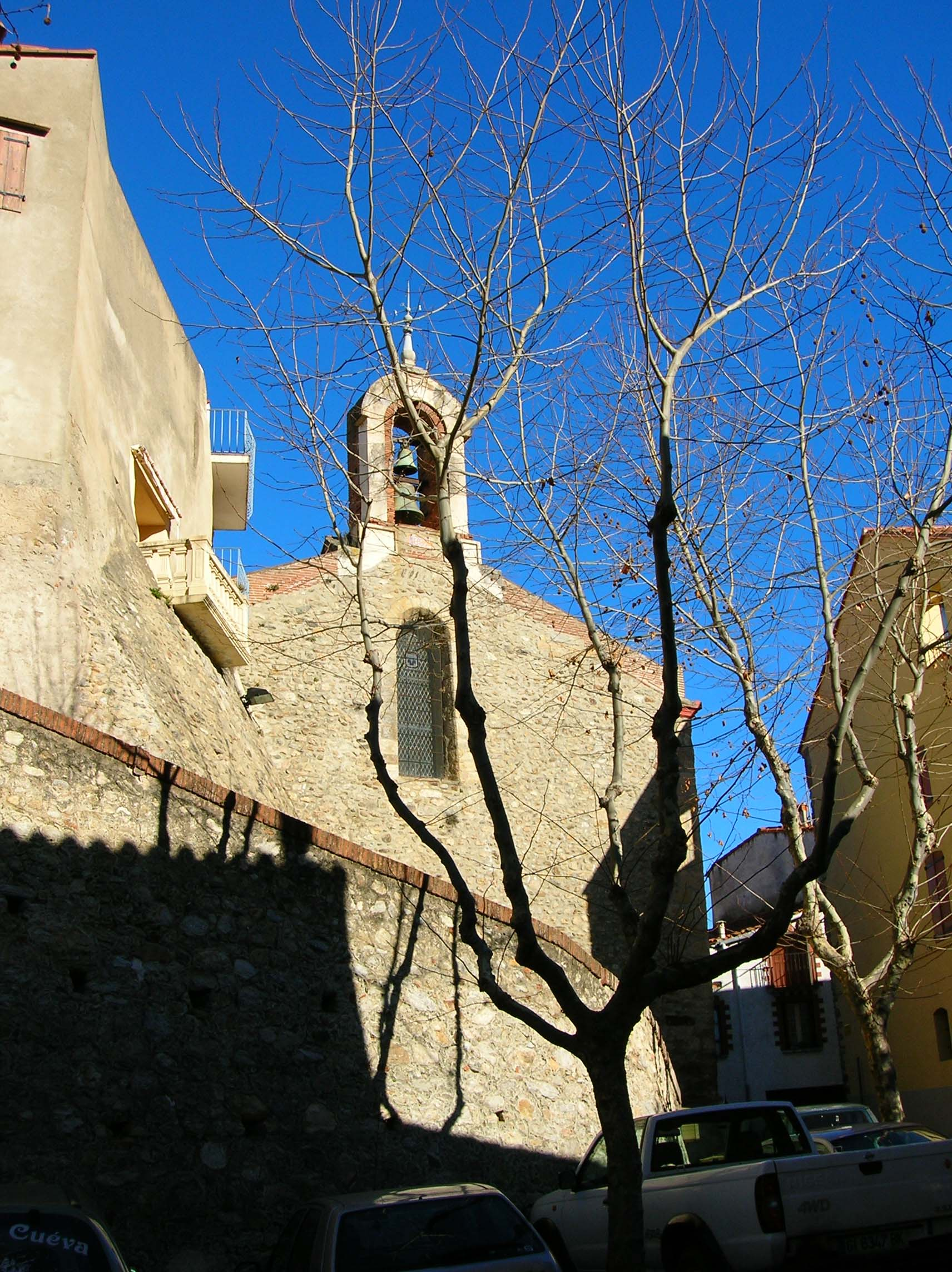
The parish church

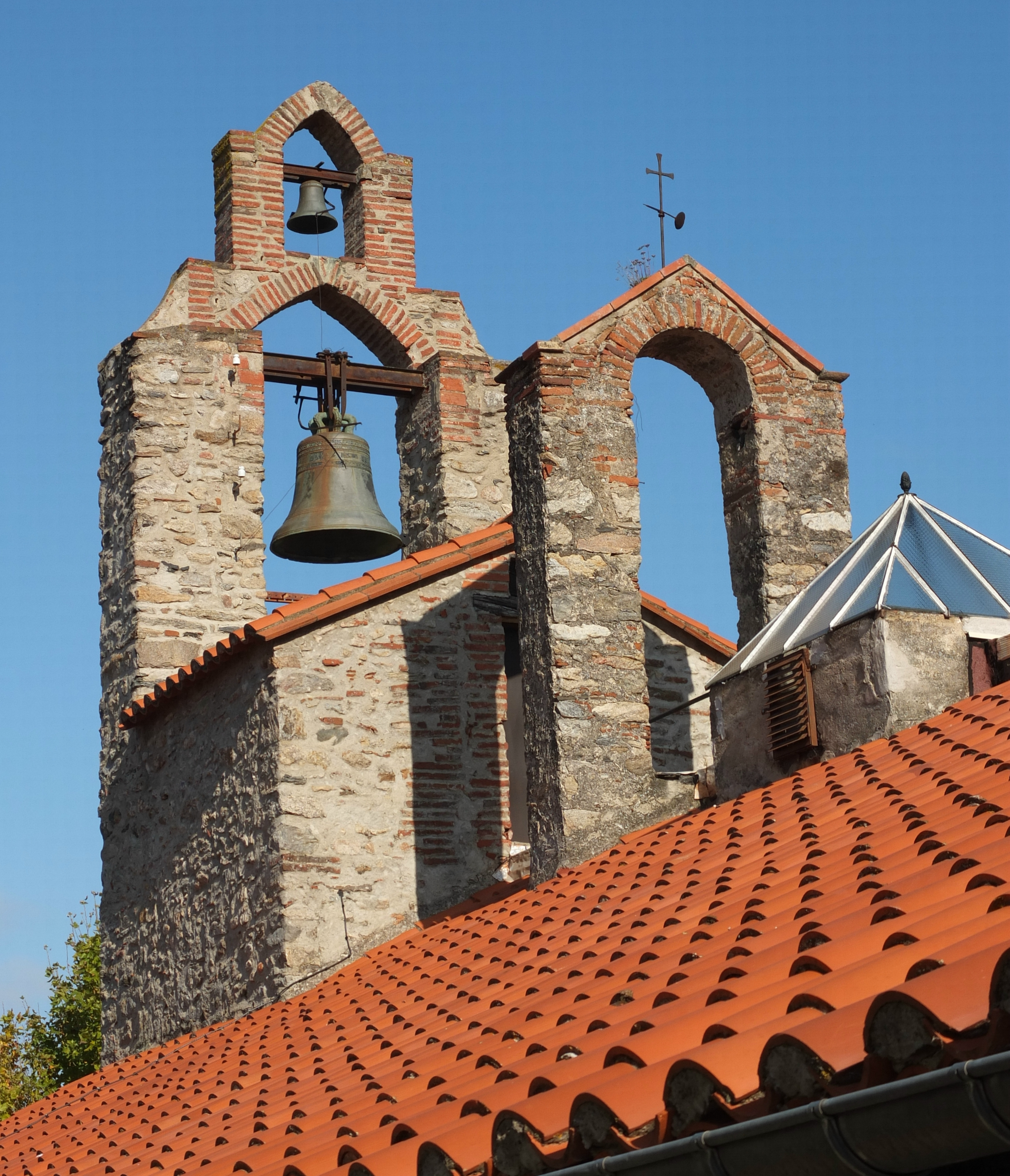
Bell gable

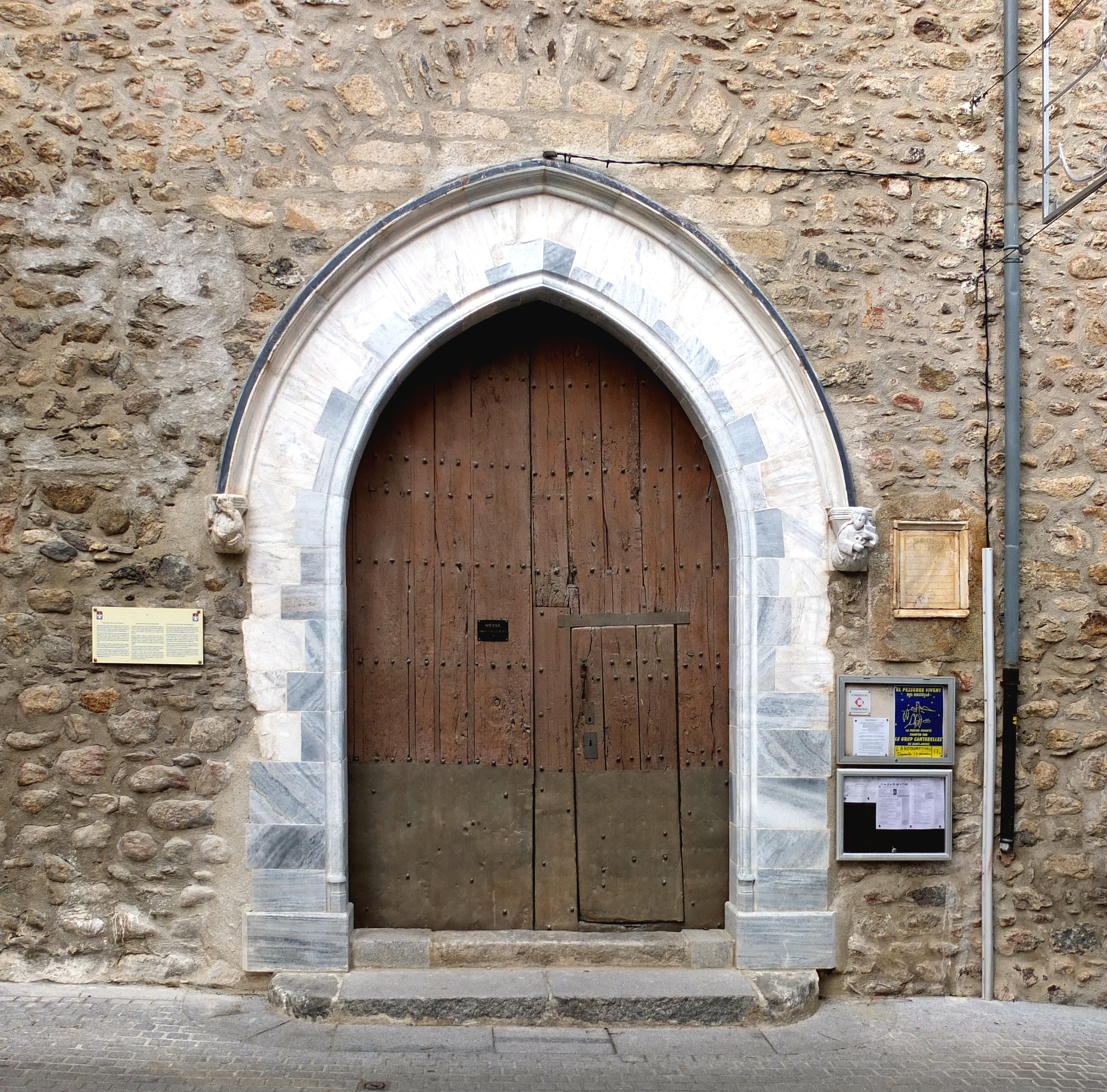
Portal with reliefs of St. Peter and St. Paul

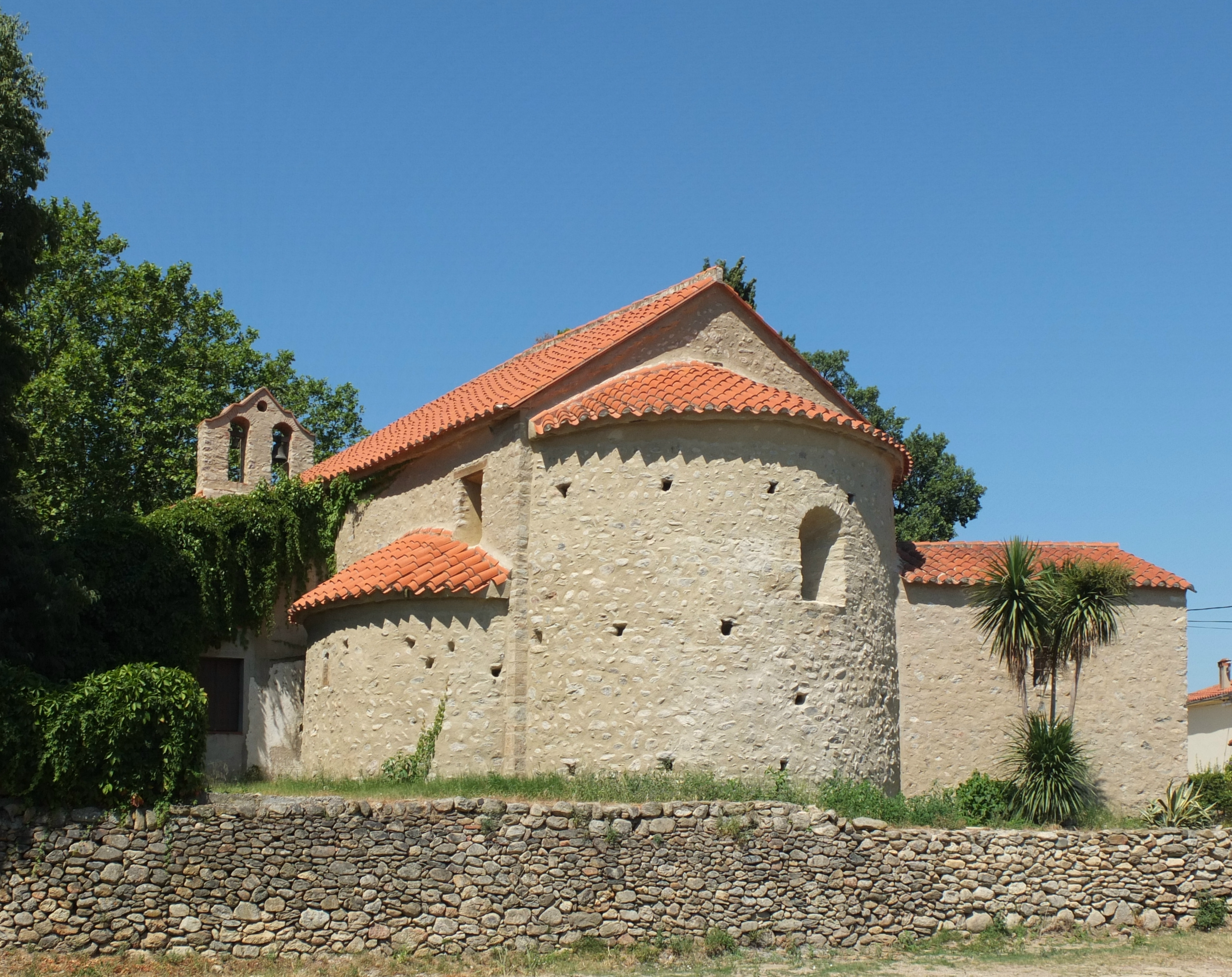
The chapel Notre-Dame de Tanya

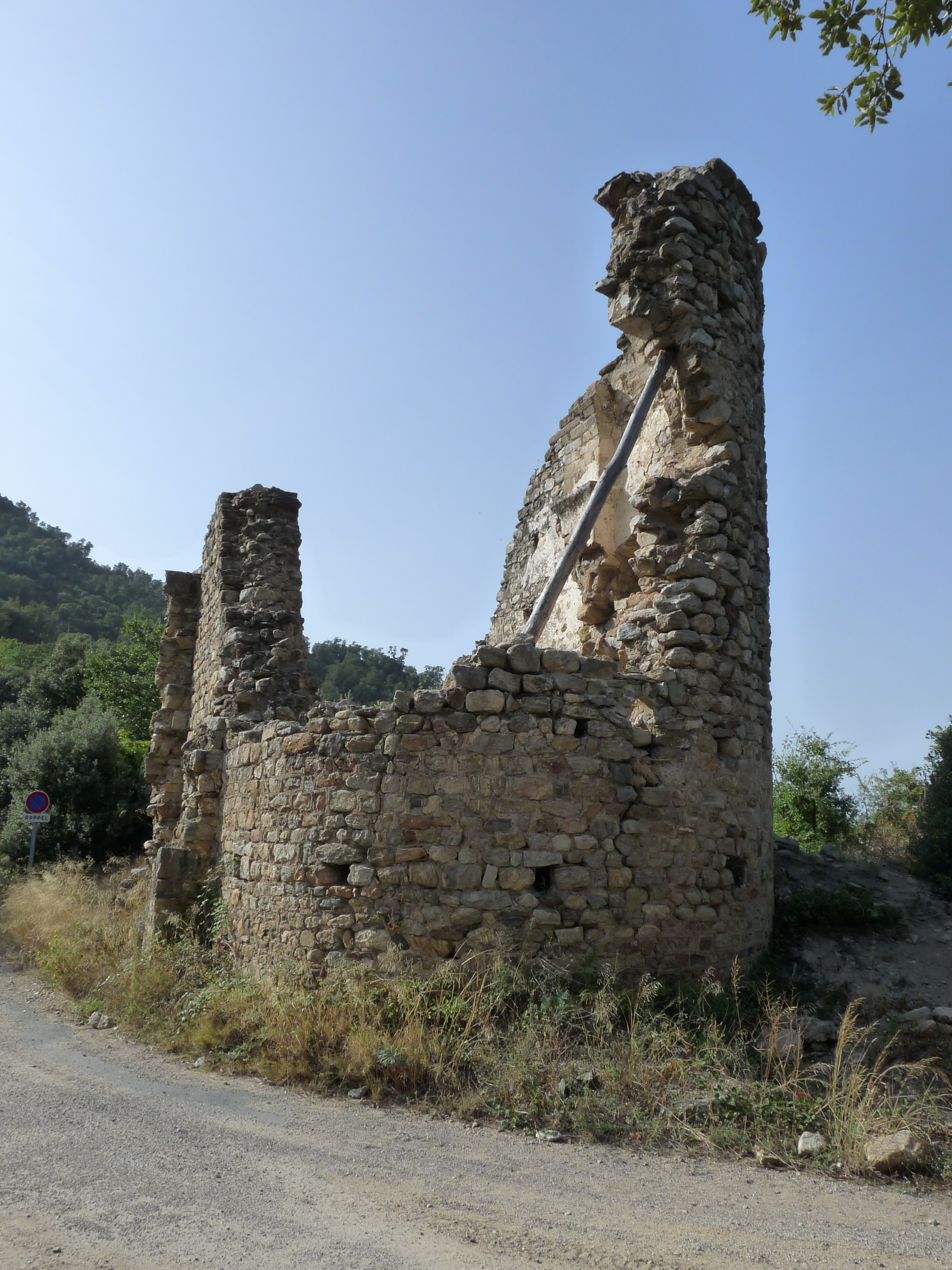
Ruins of the chapel Saint-Fructueux de Roca-Vella

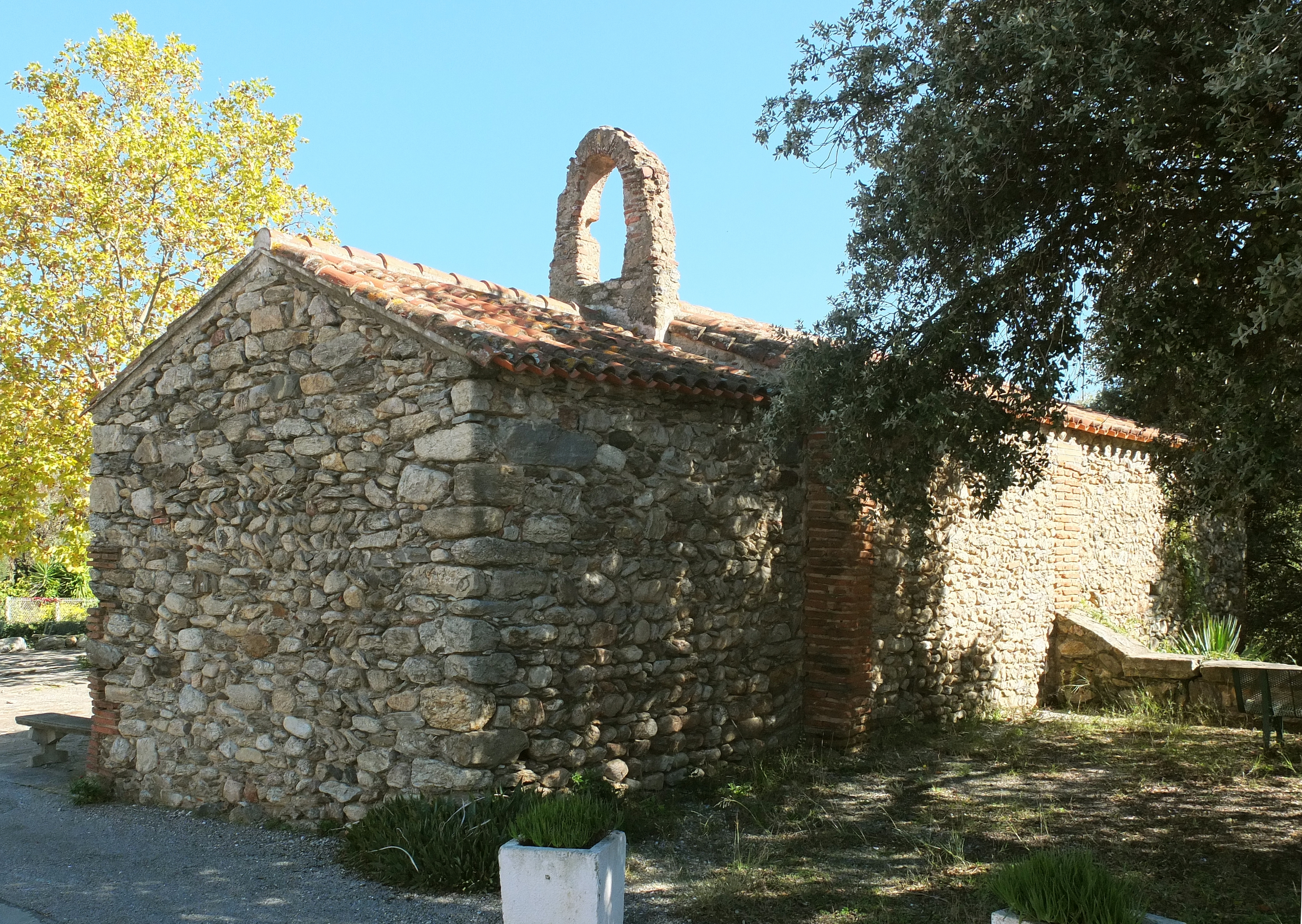
The chapel Saint-Sébastien

== See also ==
- Communes of the Pyrénées-Orientales department
