= Montesquieu-des-Albères =

Montesquieu-des-Albères Montesquiu d'Albera
- Commune
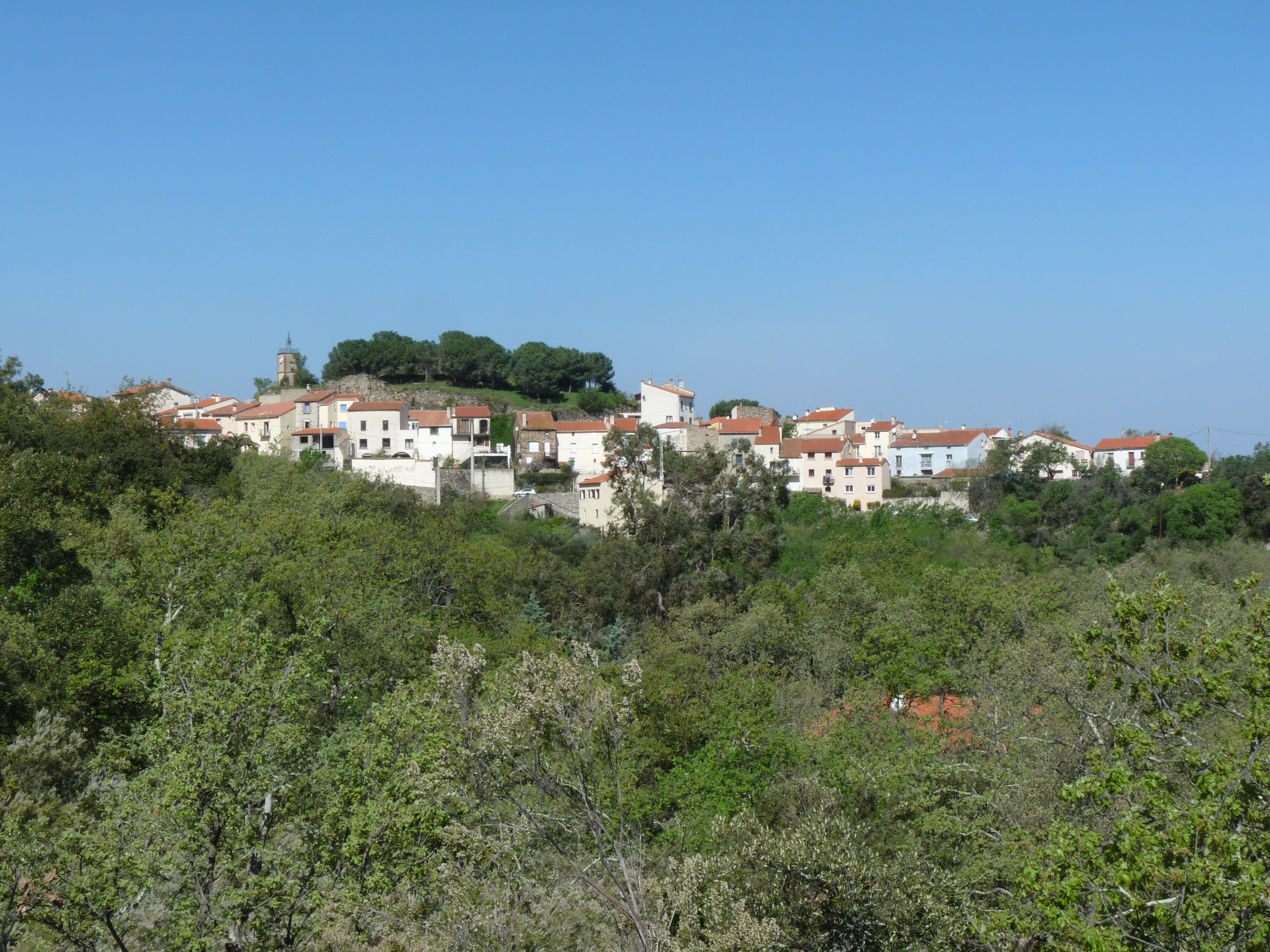
- A general view of the village and castle of Montesquieu-des-Albères

- Coat of arms
- Location of Montesquieu-des-Albères
- Location within France Location within Occitanie
- Coordinates: 42°31′05″N 2°52′56″E
- Country: France
- Region: Occitania
- Department: Pyrénées-Orientales
- Arrondissement: Céret
- Canton: Vallespir-Albères

Government
  - Mayor (2020–2026): Huguette Pons
- Area^{1}: 17.06 km^{2} (6.59 sq mi)
- Elevation: 250 m (820 ft)
- Highest elevation: 1,001 m (3,284 ft)
- Lowest elevation: 43 m (141 ft)
- Population (2023): 1,353
  - Density: 79.31/km^{2} (205.4/sq mi)
- Time zone: UTC+01:00 (CET)
  - Summer (DST): UTC+02:00 (CEST)
- INSEE/Postal code: 66115 /66740
- ^{1} French Land Register data, which excludes lakes, ponds, glaciers > 1 km^{2} (0.386 sq mi or 247 acres) and river estuaries.

Montesquieu-des-Albères (Catalan: Montesquiu d'Albera, before 1992: Montesquieu) is a commune in the Pyrénées-Orientales department in southern France.

== Geography ==
Montesquieu-des-Albères is located in the canton of Vallespir-Albères and in the arrondissement of Céret.

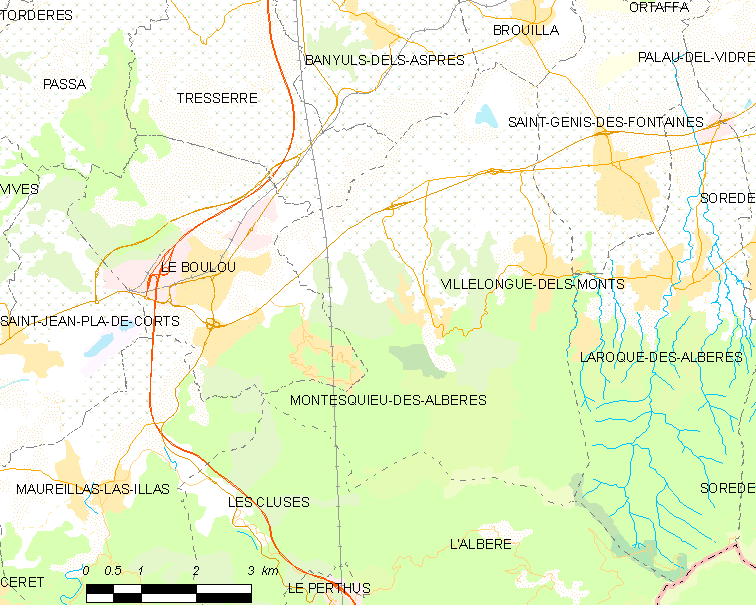
Map of Montesquieu-des-Albères and its surrounding communes

== Population ==
Historical population
Year	Pop.	±% p.a.
1968	333	—
1975	329	−0.17%
1982	510	+6.46%
1990	753	+4.99%
1999	824	+1.01%
2007	1,142	+4.16%
2012	1,195	+0.91%
2017	1,224	+0.48%
2023	1,353	+1.68%
Source: INSEE

== Sites of interest ==
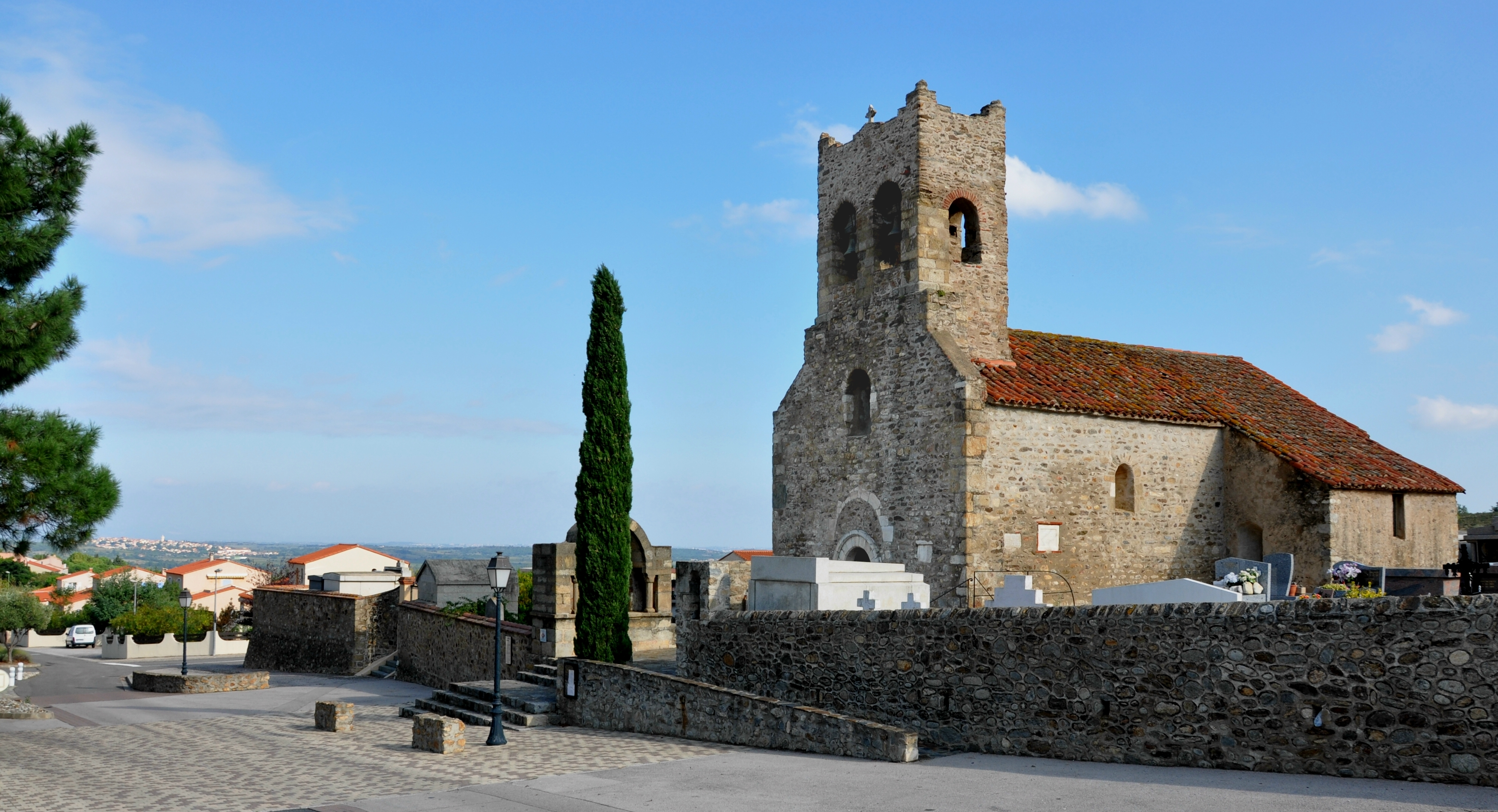
Romanesque church Saint-Saturnin de Montesquieu-des-Albères, 12th ctry.

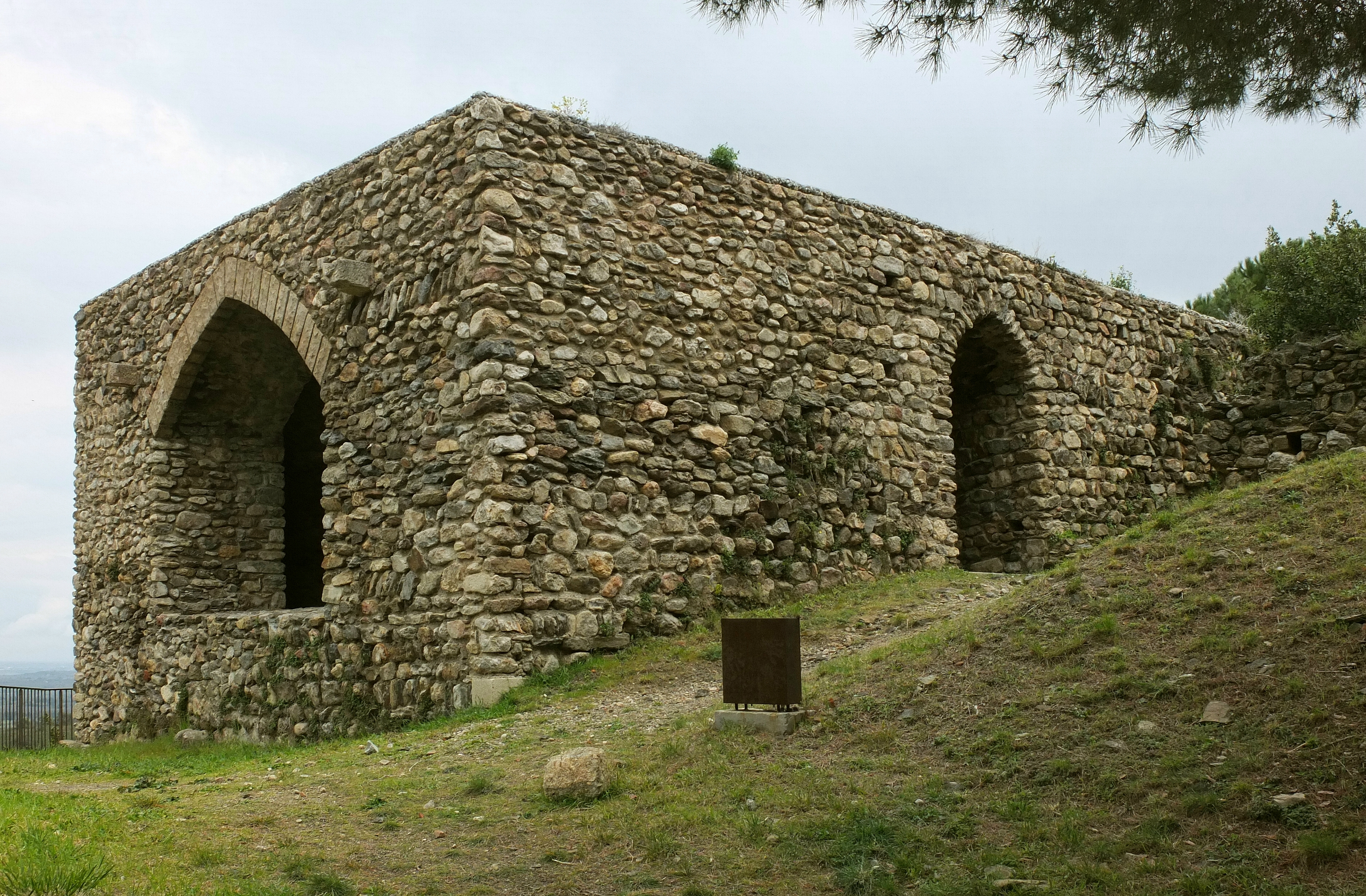
The medieval castle

- Church of Saint-Saturnin
- Church of Saint-Christopher
- Castle, 11th ctry.

== See also ==
- Communes of the Pyrénées-Orientales department
