= Saint-Génis-des-Fontaines =

Saint-Génis-des-Fontaines Sant Genís de Fontanes
- Commune
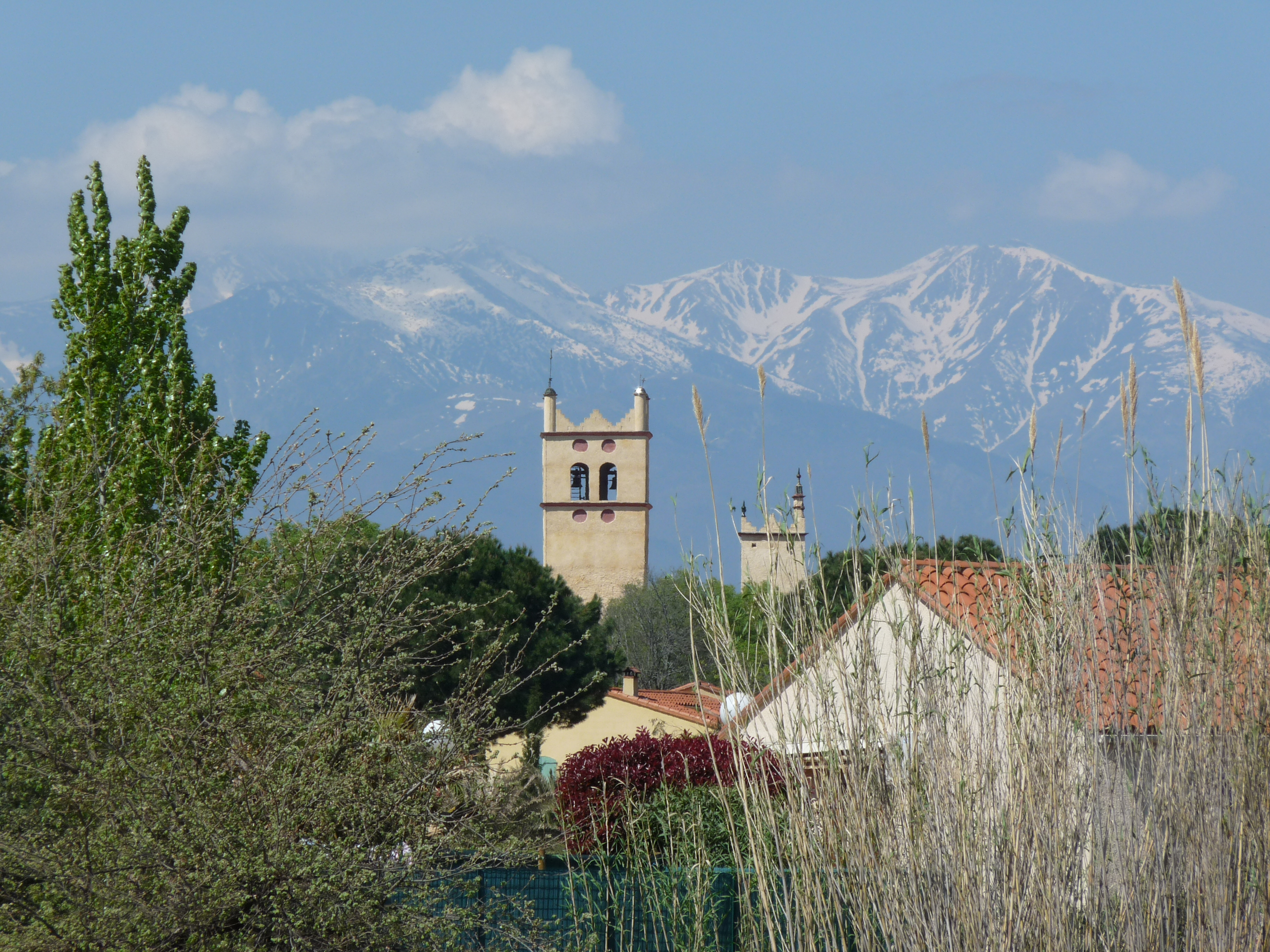
- A view of the bell-towers of the old abbey of Saint-Génis-des-Fontaines
- Location of Saint-Génis-des-Fontaines
- Location within France Location within Occitanie
- Coordinates: 42°32′33″N 2°55′22″E
- Country: France
- Region: Occitania
- Department: Pyrénées-Orientales
- Arrondissement: Céret
- Canton: Vallespir-Albères
- Intercommunality: CC des Albères, de la Côte Vermeille et de l'Illibéris

Government
  - Mayor (2020–2026): Nathalie Regond-Planas
- Area^{1}: 9.90 km^{2} (3.82 sq mi)
- Elevation: 52 m (171 ft)
- Highest elevation: 102 m (335 ft)
- Lowest elevation: 24 m (79 ft)
- Population (2023): 3,059
  - Density: 309/km^{2} (800/sq mi)
- Time zone: UTC+01:00 (CET)
  - Summer (DST): UTC+02:00 (CEST)
- INSEE/Postal code: 66175 /66740
- ^{1} French Land Register data, which excludes lakes, ponds, glaciers > 1 km^{2} (0.386 sq mi or 247 acres) and river estuaries.

Saint-Génis-des-Fontaines (French pronunciation: [sɛ̃ ʒenis de fɔ̃tɛn]; Northern Catalan: Sant Genís de Fontanes [ˈsaɲ ʒəˈniz ðə funˈtanəs]) is a commune in the Pyrénées-Orientales department in southern France.

== Geography ==
Saint-Génis-des-Fontaines is located in the canton of Vallespir-Albères and in the arrondissement of Céret.

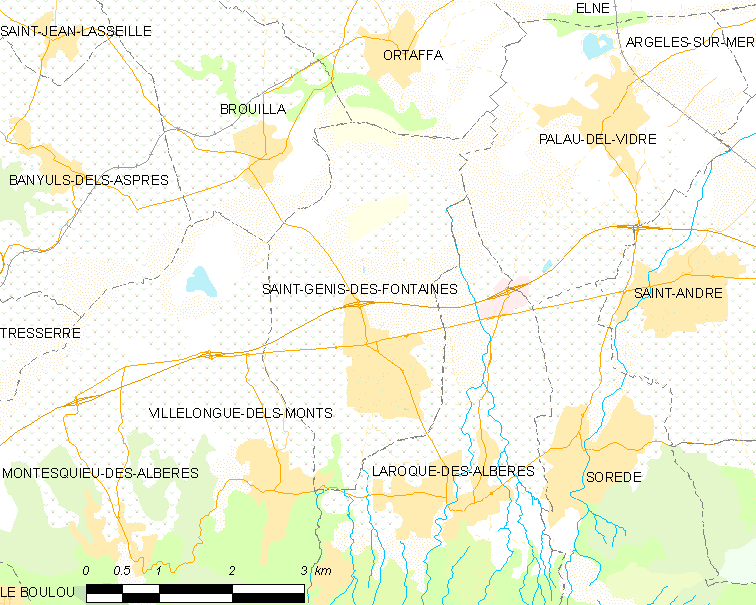
Map of Saint-Génis-des-Fontaines and its surrounding communes

== Population ==
Historical population
Year	Pop.	±% p.a.
1968	1,051	—
1975	1,107	+0.74%
1982	1,298	+2.30%
1990	1,744	+3.76%
1999	2,419	+3.70%
2007	2,783	+1.77%
2012	2,748	−0.25%
2017	2,826	+0.56%
2023	3,059	+1.33%
Source: INSEE

== Sites of interest ==
Saint-Génis-des-Fontaines is home to a Benedictine abbey, founded in the late 8th or early 9th century.

== See also ==
- Communes of the Pyrénées-Orientales department
