= Puig =

Puig (Catalan pronunciation: [ˈputʃ]) is a word and surname of Catalan origin, meaning "hill" or "peak". The word derives from Latin podium meaning "balcony".

== Geographical features ==
- Puig-l'agulla, a mountain of Catalonia
- Puig de l'Àliga (Sant Pere de Torelló), a mountain of Catalonia
- Puig d'Arques, a mountain of Catalonia
- Puig de Bassegoda, a mountain of Catalonia
- Puig Campana, a mountain of Alicante, Spain
- Puig Castellar (Balenyà), a mountain of Catalonia
- Puig Cerverís, a mountain of Catalonia
- Puig de la Collada Verda, a mountain of Catalonia
- Puig Cornador (Les Llosses), a mountain of Catalonia
- Puig Cornador (Ribes de Freser), a mountain of Catalonia
- Puig Cornador (Sant Sadurní d'Osormort), a mountain of Catalonia
- Puig Cornador (Vilanova de Sau), a mountain of Catalonia
- Puig de Dòrria, a mountain of Catalonia
- Puig Drau, a mountain of Catalonia
- Puig Estela, a mountain of Catalonia
- Puig de Fontlletera, a mountain of Catalonia
- Puig de Fontnegra, a mountain of Catalonia
- Puig Major, the highest mountain peak on the Spanish island of Mallorca
- Puig de Massanella, the second highest peak on Mallorca
- Puig de la Mola, a mountain of Catalonia
- Puig de sa Morisca Archaeological Park, on Mallorca
- Puig Neulós, a mountain of Catalonia
- Puig de l'Obiol, a mountain of Catalonia
- Puig d'Ombriaga, a mountain of Catalonia
- Puig de Pastuira, a mountain of Catalonia
- Puig de Randa, a mountain peak on Mallorca
- Puig-reig, a municipality of Catalonia
- Puig Sesarques, a mountain of Catalonia
- Puig de la Talaia, a mountain of Catalonia
- Puig Tomir, a mountain on Mallorca
- El Puig de Santa Maria, a village near the city of Valencia, Spain

== Sport ==
- CB Puig d'en Valls, a Spanish women's basketball club
- Luis Puig Palace, a sporting arena in Valencia
- Trofeo Luis Puig, a bicycle race held annually in Valencia

== Other uses ==
- Puig (surname)
- Battle of the Puig, which took place in Valencia in 1237, during the Reconquista
- Fabra i Puig (Barcelona Metro), a Barcelona Metro station
- Puig (company), international company operating in fashion and perfume sectors
- Puig subgroup, a characteristic subgroup in mathematical finite group theory

== See also ==
- Le Puy (disambiguation)
- Puy, a geological term used locally in the Auvergne, France for a volcanic hill
