= Puig Cornador =

Puig Cornador may refer to several mountains in Catalonia, Spain:

- Puig Cornador (Les Llosses), 1229 m
- Puig Cornador (Ribes de Freser), 1799 m
- Puig Cornador (Sant Sadurní d'Osormort), 859 m
- Puig Cornador (Vilanova de Sau), 621 m
