= PUJ =

PUJ may mean:

- IATA airport code for Punta Cana International Airport
- FAA LID code for Paulding County Regional Airport
- Public Utility Jeepney
- Pelvico ureteral junction or Ureteropelvic junction - Where the ureter connects to the renal pelvis

== See also ==
- PUI (disambiguation)
- Puy
