= Banyuls =

Banyuls may refer to:

- Banyuls-sur-Mer, commune in the Pyrénées-Orientales department, France
- Banyuls AOC, a wine-growing region named for Banyuls-sur-Mer
- Banyuls-dels-Aspres, commune in the Pyrénées-Orientales department, France
- Coll de Banyuls, mountain pass between France and Spain
