= Sant Quirze =

Sant Quirze, Catalan for Saint Cyriacus, may refer to:

- Sant Quirze de Besora, municipality in the comarca of Osona
- Sant Quirze de Colera, Benedictine monastery in Rabós
- Sant Quirze del Vallès, town in the comarca of the Vallès Occidental
- Sant Quirze Safaja, municipality in the comarca of the Vallès Oriental
