= Albera Massif =

Mountain range in France and Spain

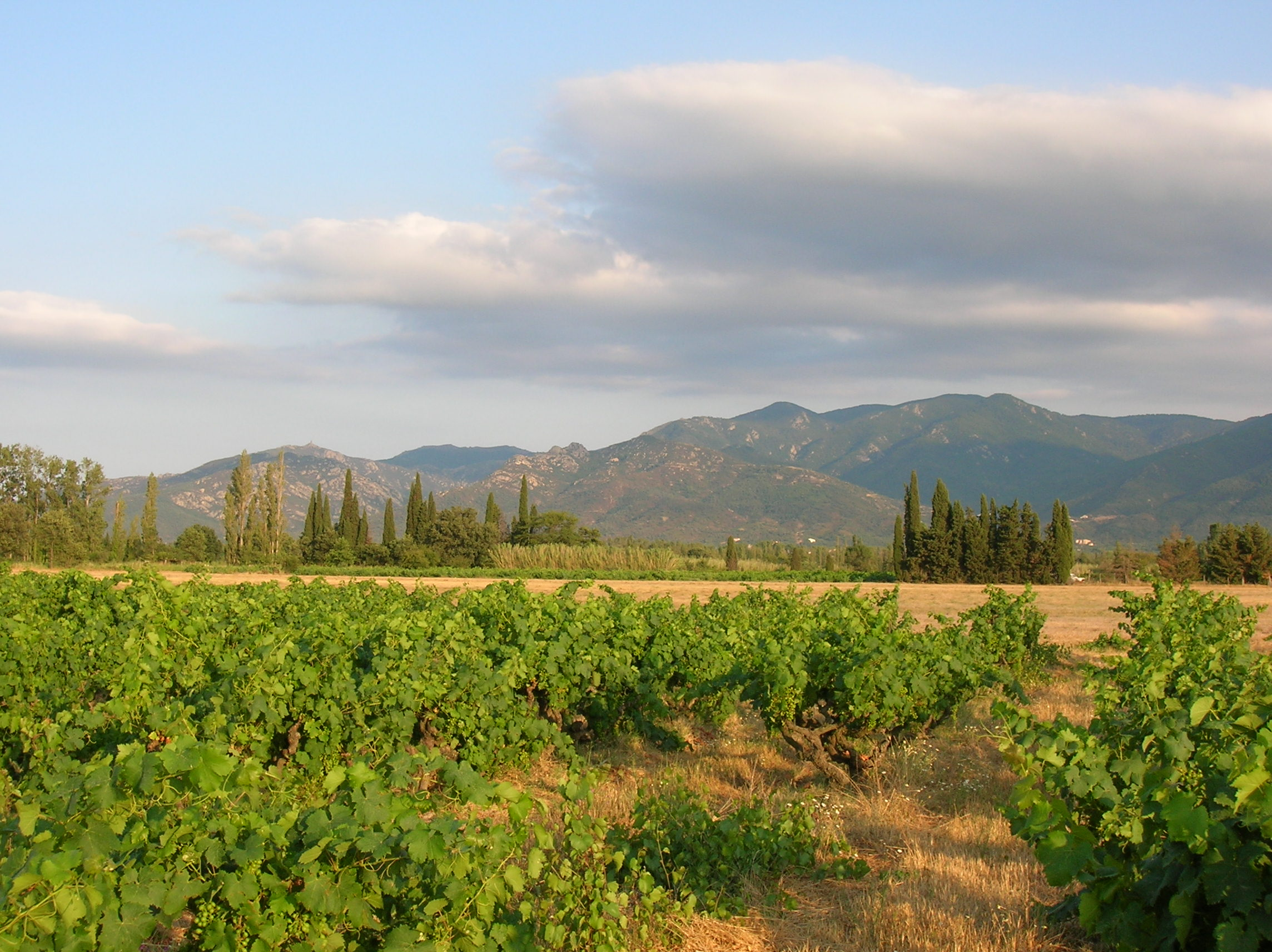
- The northern side of the Albera Massif seen from Sant Genís de Fontanes

Highest point
- Elevation: 1,256 m (4,121 ft)
- Coordinates: 42°28′55″N 2°56′49″E

Geography
- Location within Pyrenees
- Location: Pyrénées-Orientales; Empordà, Catalonia
- Parent range: Foothills of the Pyrenees

Climbing
- First ascent: Unknown
- Easiest route: From La Jonquera or Sureda

The Albera Massif (Catalan: Serra de l'Albera; Occitan: Massís d'Albera; French: Massif des Albères) is a mountain range located in the south of Pyrénées-Orientales and the north of Catalonia, between France and Spain. It is the main easternmost prolongation of the Pyrenees. Its highest peak is the Puig Neulós, with an elevation of 1,256 metres.

Most of the southern side of the range is part of the Paratge Natural d'Interès Nacional de l'Albera natural reserve. There are some ancient megaliths in the range. The Col du Perthus marks the western boundary of the massif.

The massif is at the eastern end of the "Axial Zone" of the Pyrenees mountain range. As in most of that zone, the geological formations in the massif are mostly of Paleozoic and earlier ages, with granite, gneiss, and schists (and other metasediments) being the predominant formations.

On the northern slopes of the massif, the Albères fault (which runs roughly west to east from near Le Boulou to near Argelès) marks a clear geological and topographical boundary between the Palaeozoic and older formations of the Albera massif and the Neogene deposits of the Roussillon basin.

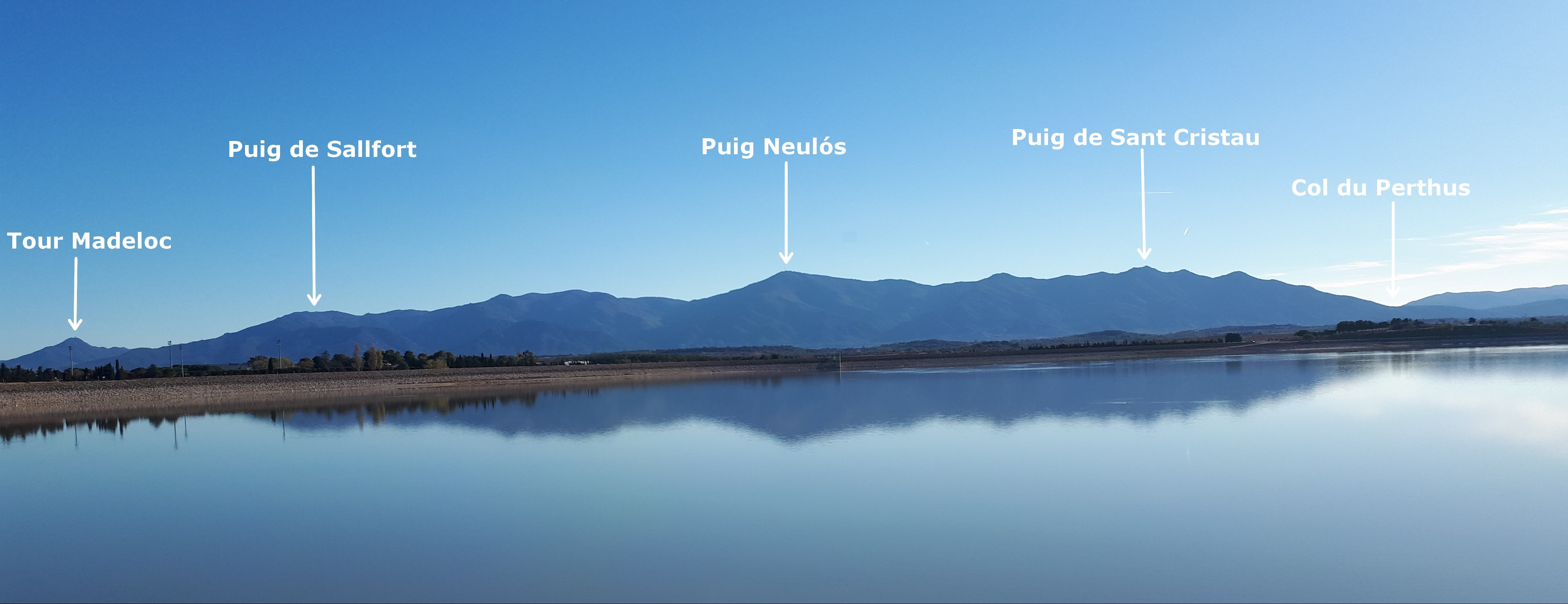
The massif seen from the Lac de Villeneuve-de-la-Raho.

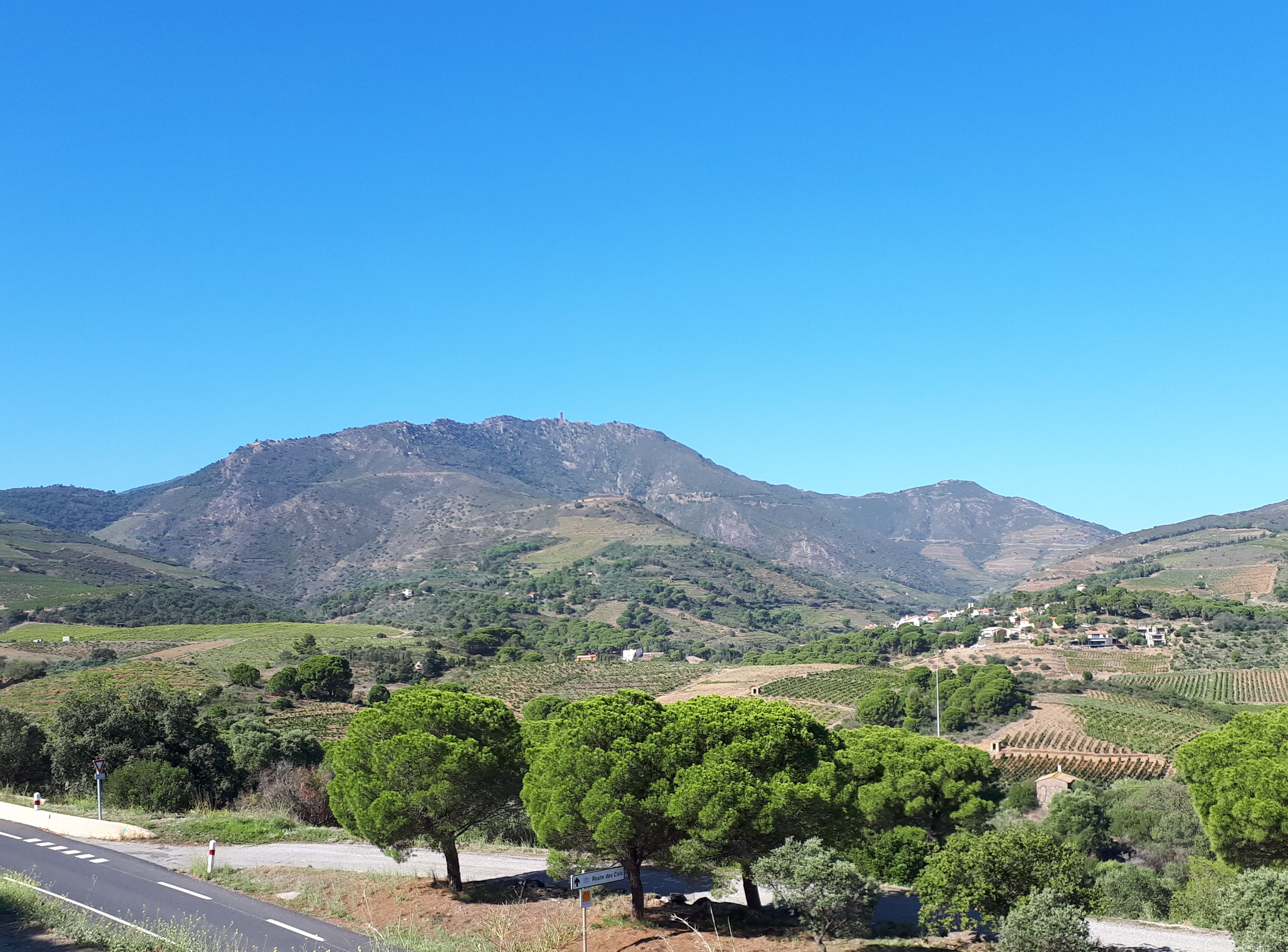
The Tour Madeloc ridge, at the eastern end of the Albères (Albera) massif. The ridge is situated on a zone consisting of fine-grained sandstones of volcanosedimentary origin ("Grès de la Tour Madeloc").

== History ==
The Albera Range became the border between France and Spain following the Treaty of the Pyrenees, when Philip IV of Spain ceded a part of the Spanish kingdom to Louis XIV of France, dividing Northern Catalonia from Historical Catalonia.

== Gallery ==
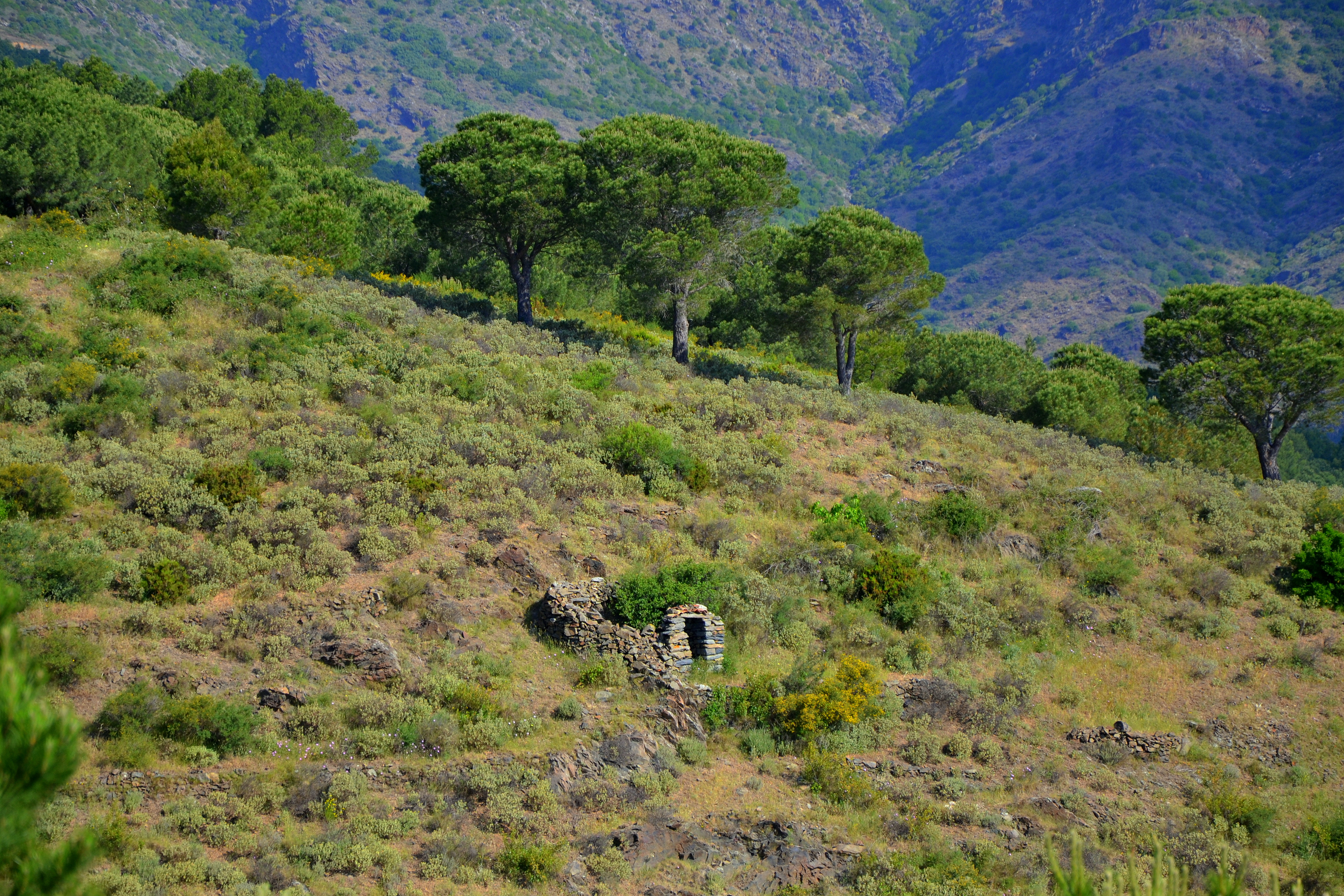
Albera Massif

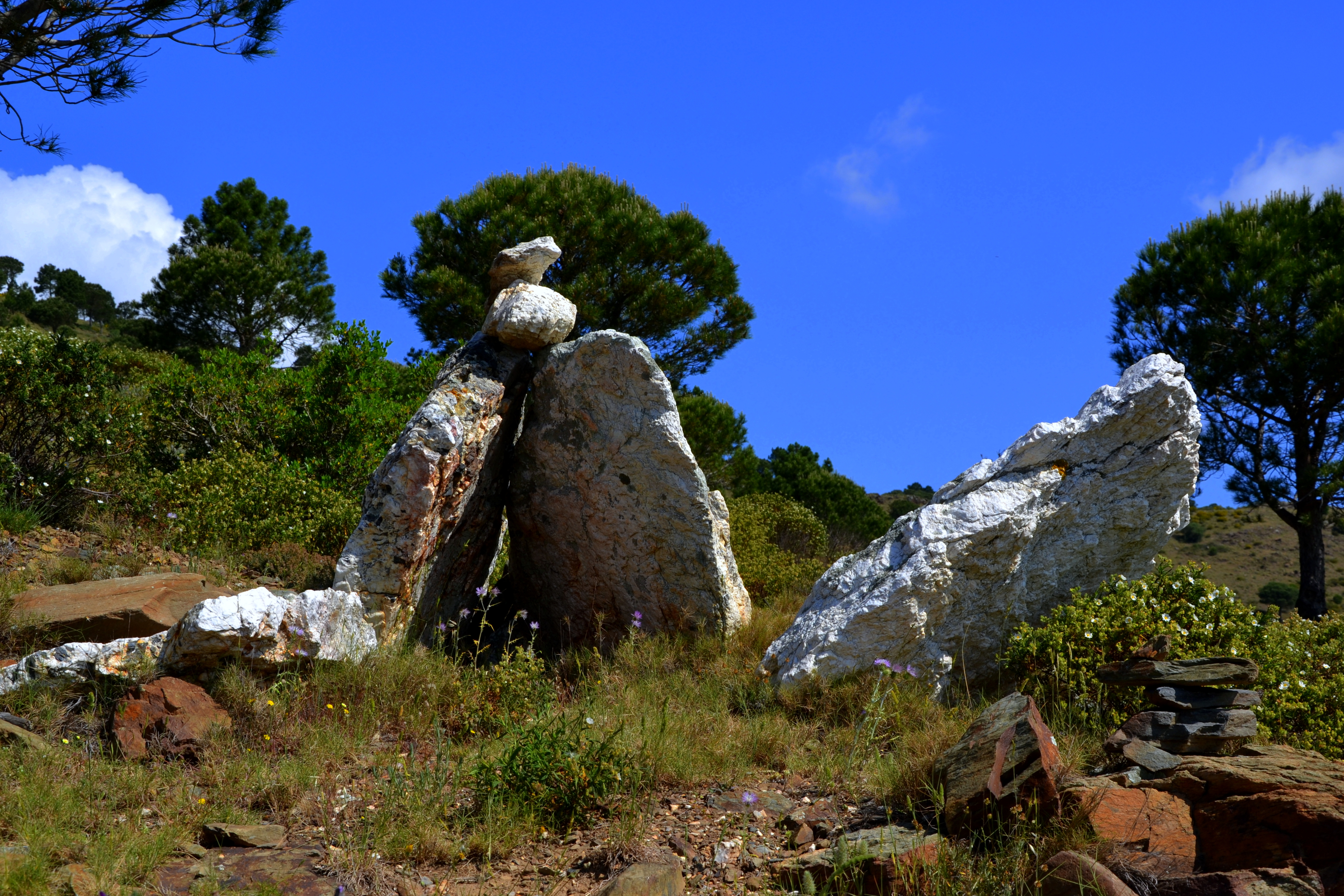
Albera Massif

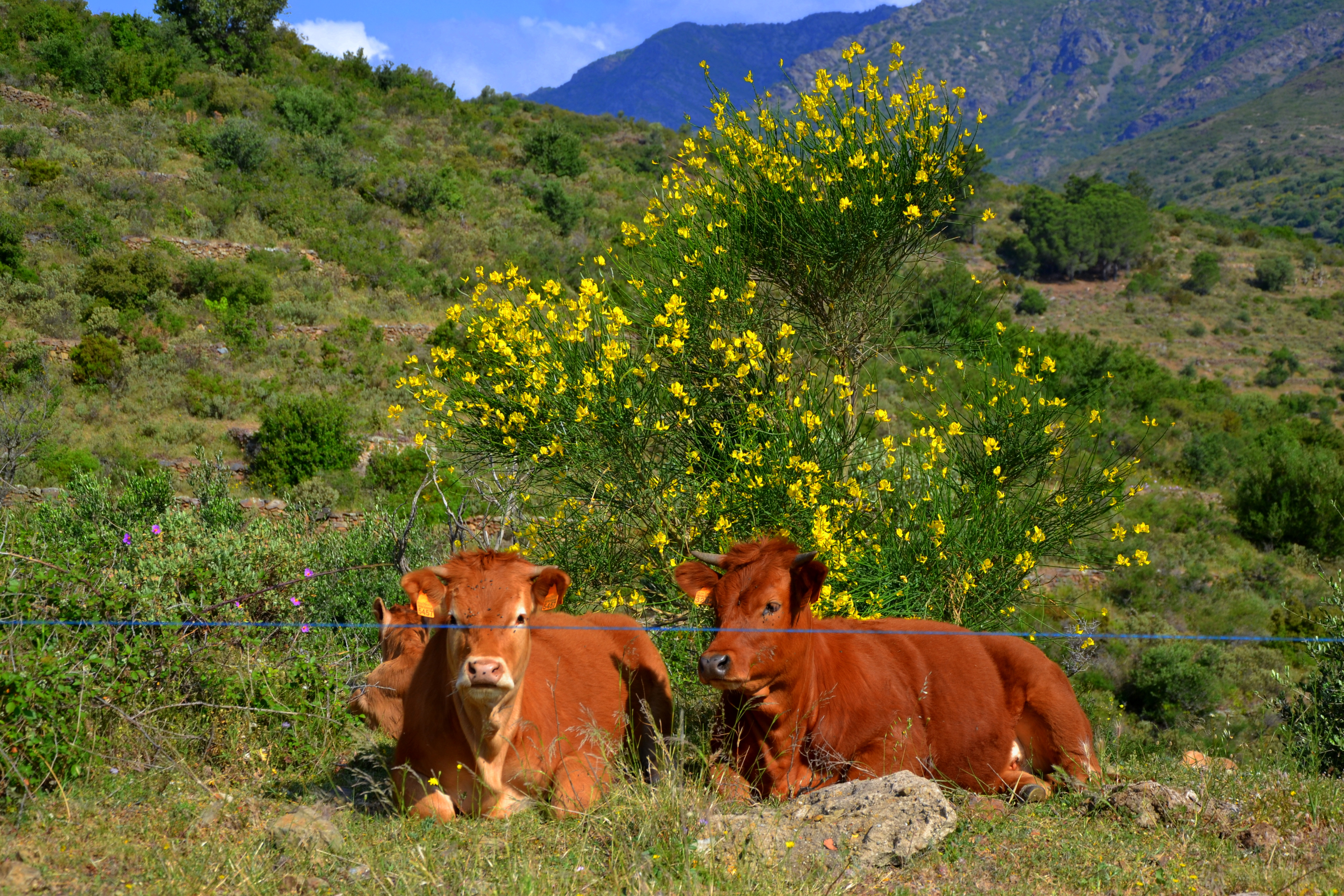
Albera Massif

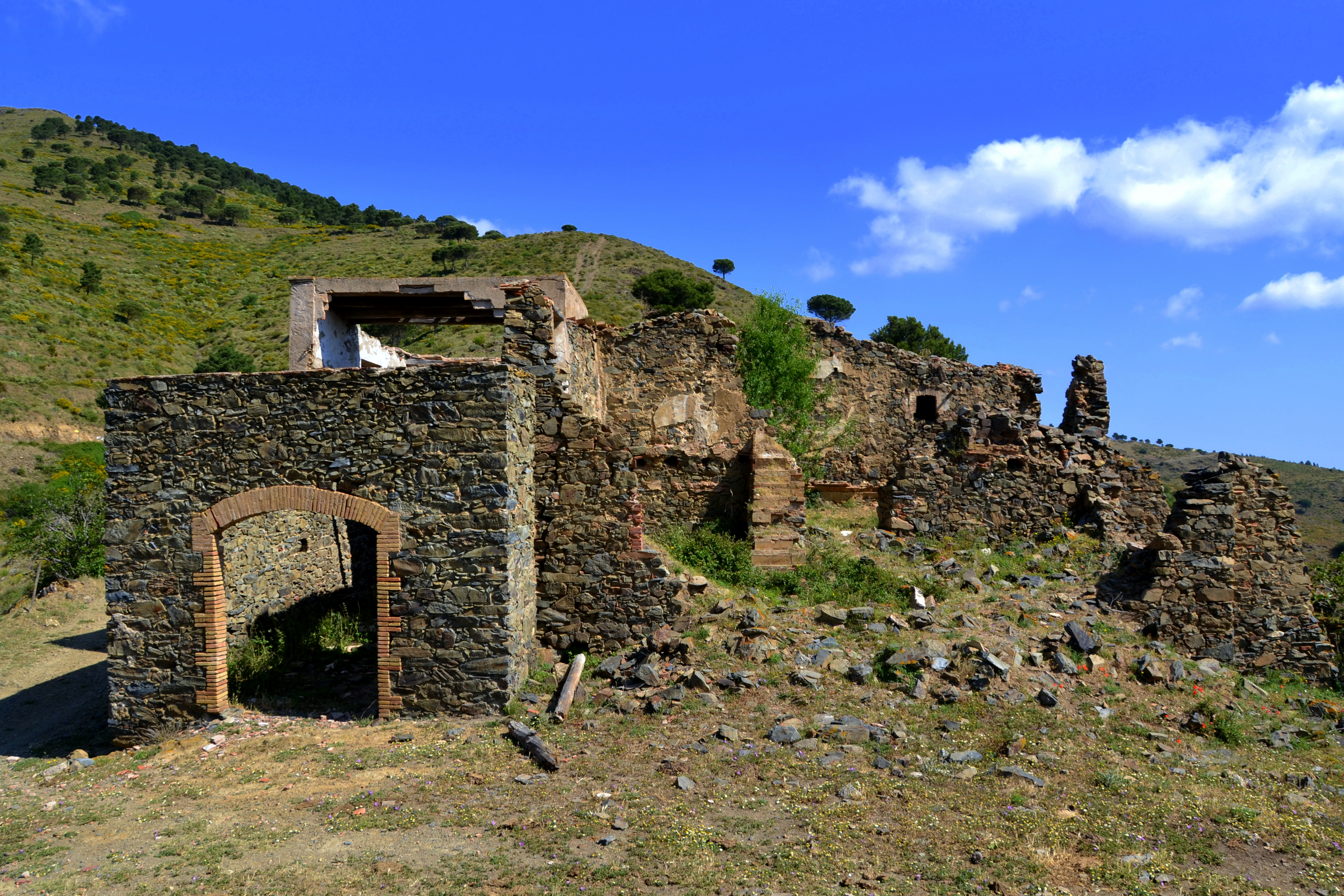
Albera Massif

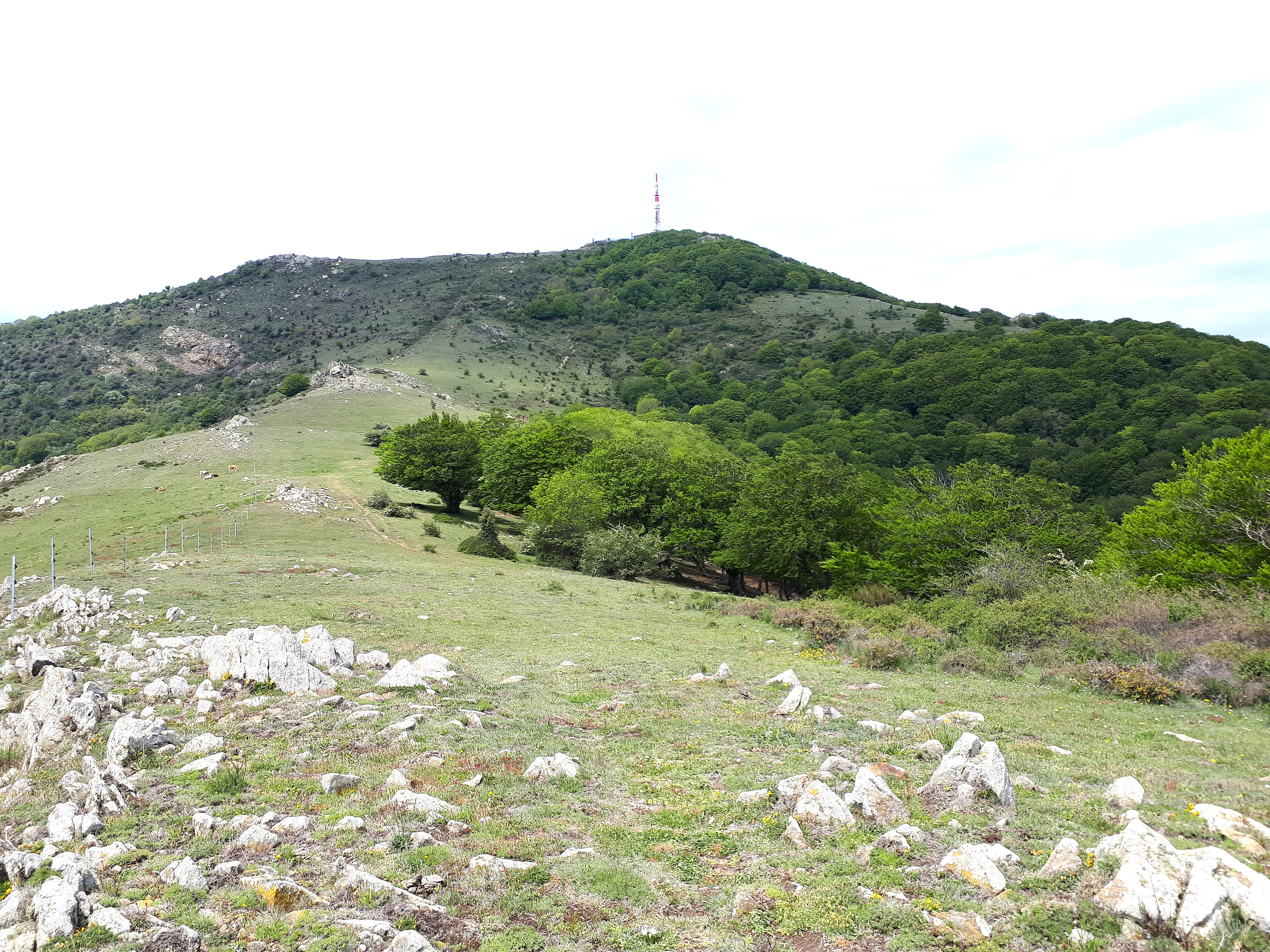
Puig Neulós

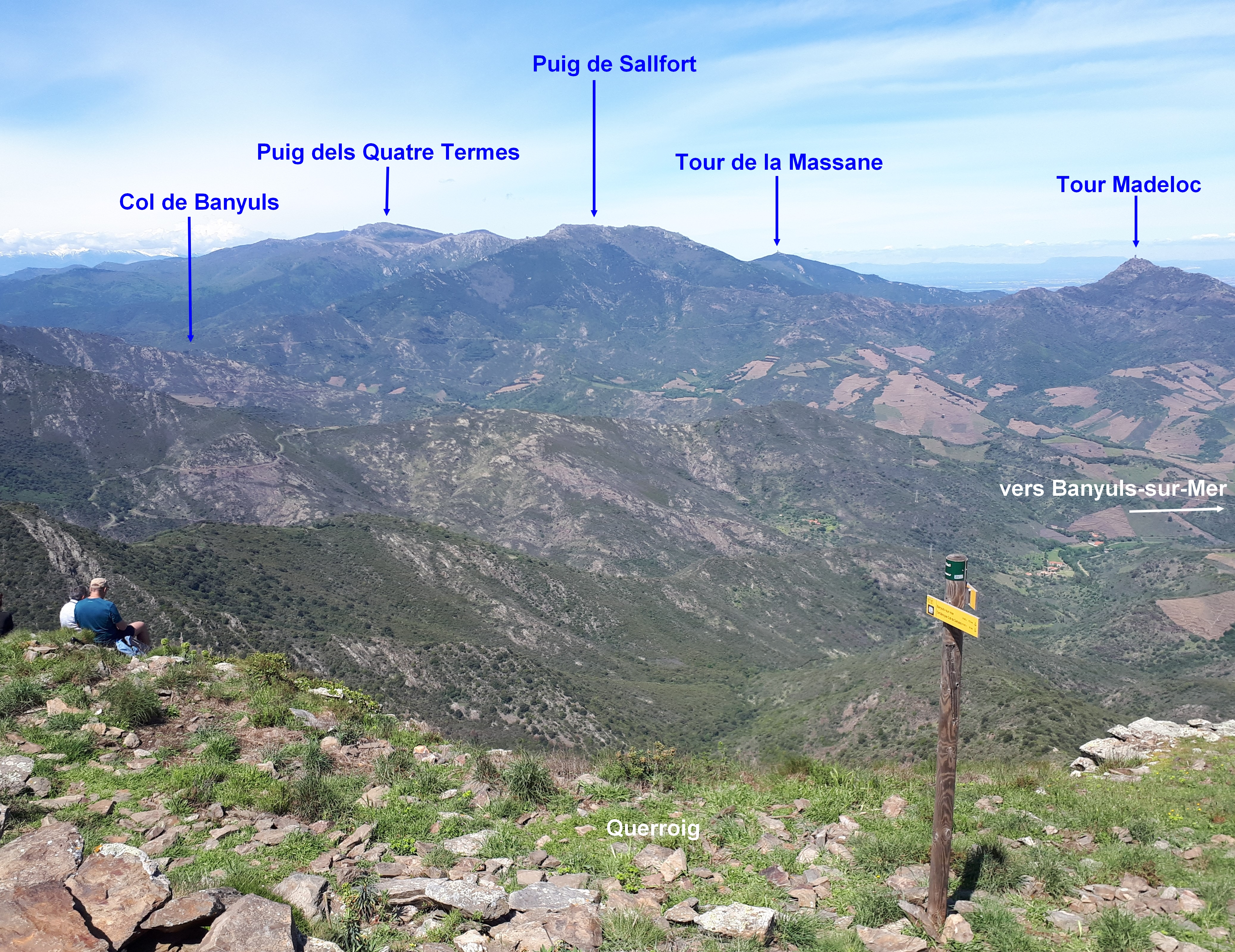
Puig Sallfort seen from the Tour de Querroig.

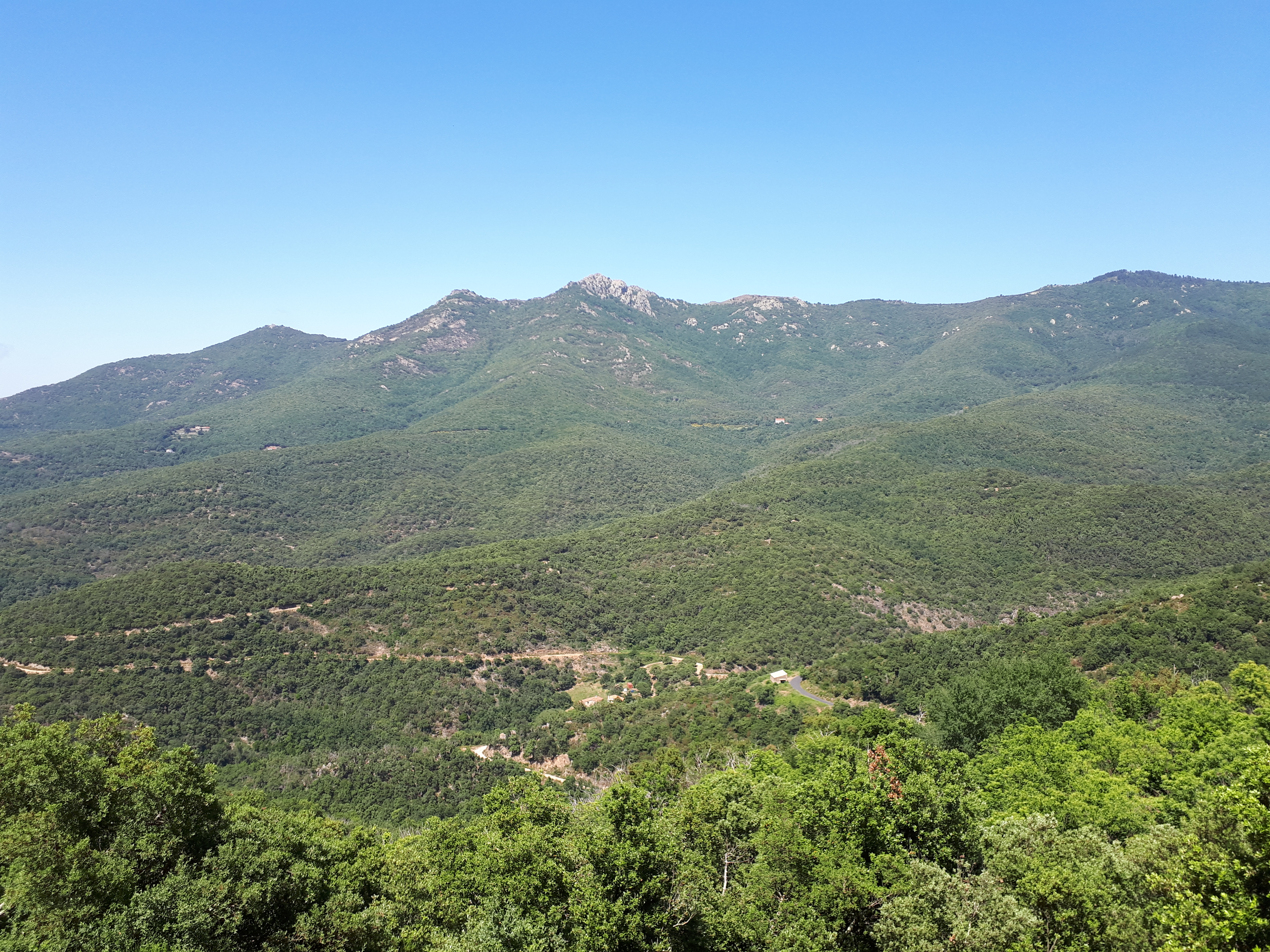
Puig de Sant Cristau, towards the western end of the massif.

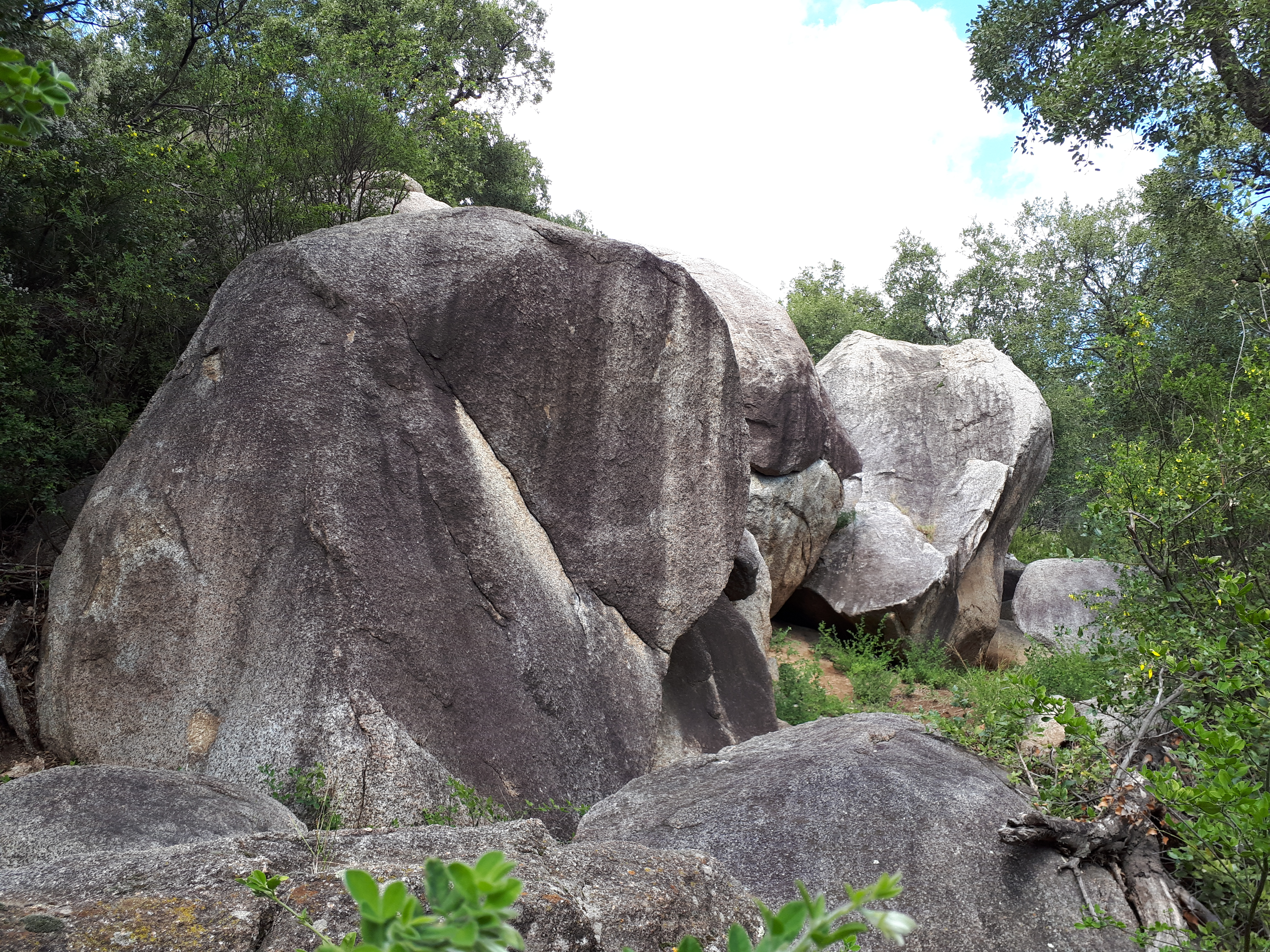
Granite outcrop, above La Jonquera.

== See also ==
- Treaty of the Pyrenees
- Mountains of Catalonia
- Coll de Banyuls
