= Anna Ballbona i Puig =

Spanish journalist, writer and literary critic

Anna Ballbona
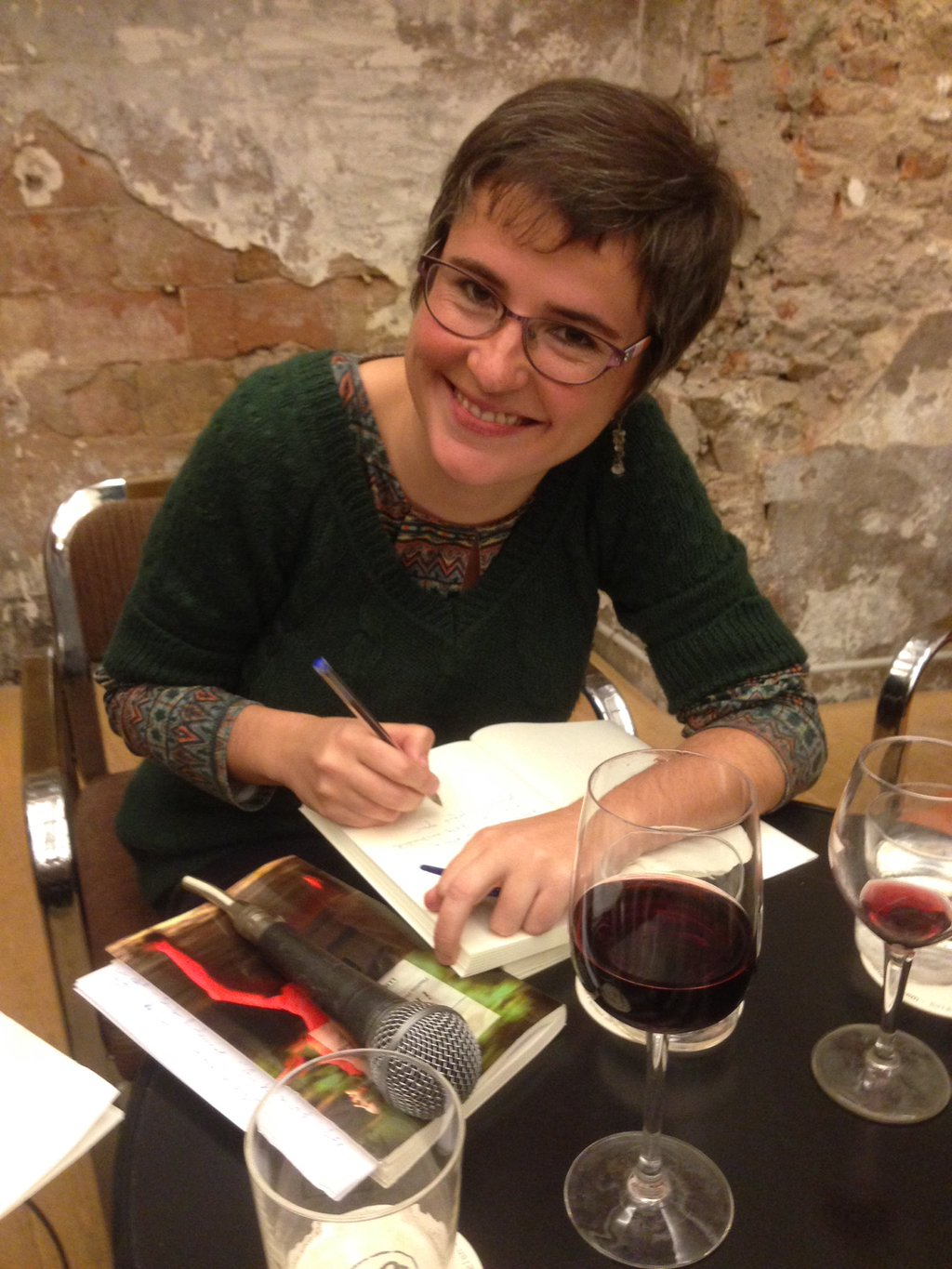
- Ballbona in 2014
- Born: Anna Ballbona i Puig; 1980 (age 45–46); Montmeló, Catalonia, Spain
- Writing career
- Language: Catalan, Spanish
- Genre: Poetry

Anna Ballbona i Puig (Montmeló, 1980) is a Spanish journalist, writer and literary critic. She usually collaborates on media such as El PuntAvui, El 9 Nou, El 9 Esportiu i Núvol. She studied Journalism, Literary theory and Comparative literature. In 2008 she was awarded the Premi Amadeu Oller for her first book of poems, La mare que et renyava era un robot. In 2016 she was one of the first writers to use the Faber Residency.

== Published work ==
- La mare que et renyava era un robot, Galerada, 2002
- Quàntiques!: 10 poetes joves en diferencial femení, Universitat Autònoma de Barcelona, 2008 [collective work]
- Conill de gàbia, Labreu edicions, 2012
- Joyce i les gallines (a novel), Anagrama, 2016
- No soc aquí (Anagrama, 2020)

== Awards ==
- 2008 — Premi Amadeu Oller
- 2009 — Premi Salvador Reynaldos of Journalism
- 2020 — Anagrama Award for Catalan novels.
