= Puig (surname) =

Puig (Catalan pronunciation: [ˈputʃ]) is a topographical or habitational surname of Catalan origin, meaning "hill" or "hillock".

People with the surname include:

- Alberto Puig (born 1967), Spanish motorcycle road racer
- Anna Balletbó i Puig (born 1943), Spanish academic, journalist and politician
- Anna Ballbona i Puig (born 1980), Spanish journalist
- Arturo Puig (born 1944), Argentine actor
- Carmen Montoriol Puig (1893–1966), Spanish writer
- Claudia Puig (born 1956), American entertainment journalist and film critic
- Felip Puig (born 1958), Spanish politician
- Fèlix Cardona i Puig (1903–1982), Venezuelan explorer
- Herman Puig (1928–2021), Cuban photographer
- Isidre Puig Boada (1891–1987), Spanish architect
- Jack Joseph Puig, music engineer and producer
- Joan Puig i Elias (1898–1972), Catalan pedagogue and anarchist
- Jordi Puig (born 1971), Spanish basketball player
- Jordi Puig-Suari, professor and aerospace technology developer
- José Manuel Puig Casauranc (1888–1939), Mexican politician and journalist
- José María Cabo Puig (1907–1991), Spanish footballer
- José Puig Puig (1922–1997), Spanish footballer
- Josep Puig i Cadafalch (1867–1956), Catalan architect
- Juan Carlos Puig, Secretary of the Treasury of Puerto Rico
- Juan Falconí Puig, Ecuadorian jurist, politician, businessman, university professor, and writer
- Lucas Puig (born 1987), French professional skateboarder
- Manny Puig (born 1954), Manny "Sharkman" Puig, American wildlife educator and entertainer
- Manuel Puig (1932–1990), Argentine author
- Marc Puig, CEO of Spanish fashion company Puig
- Mathieu Puig (born 1978), French footballer
- Max Puig (born circa 1946), Dominican politician
- Monica Puig (born 1993), Puerto Rican tennis player
- Pedro Puig Pulido (born 1932), Spanish chess master
- Pere Puig Subinyà (1914–1999), Spanish politician
- Ricardo Álvarez Puig (born 1984), Spanish footballer
- Rich Puig (born 1953), American baseball player
- Riqui Puig (Ricard "Riqui" Puig Martí, born 1999), Spanish footballer
- Robert Aubert Puig, a.k.a. Puig Aubert (1925–1994), French rugby league footballer
- Salvador Bécquer Puig (1939–2009), Uruguayan poet and journalist
- Salvador Puig Antich (1948–1974), Spanish anarchist
- Valeria Puig (born 1988), Uruguayan film-maker
- Victoria Puig de Lange (1916–2008), Ecuadorian author, composer, and diplomat
- Yasiel Puig (born 1990), Cuban baseball player
