= Pui (disambiguation) =

Pui is a village in Romania.

Pui or PUI may also refer to:

- Pui (society), a mediaeval artistic society
- Pui River, a tributary of the Slănic River in Romania
- Patient under investigation (or person under investigation), a term used during outbreaks of new diseases
- Pui Fan Lee (born 1969/70), British actress

== See also ==
- Puy
