= Les Borregues =

Coordinates: 42°23′47″N 2°14′52″E

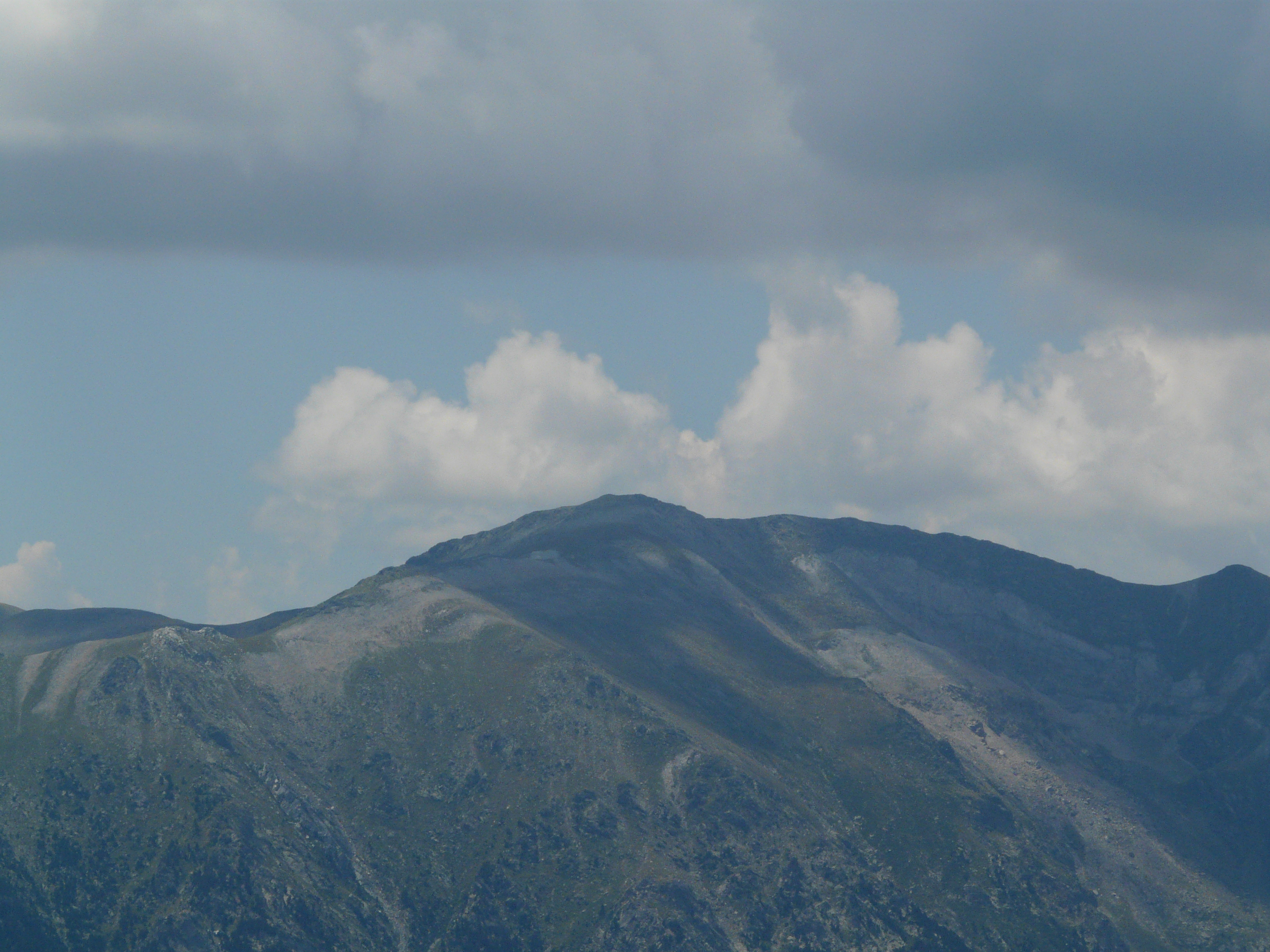

Highest point
- Elevation: 2,693 m (8,835 ft)

Geography
- Location: Catalonia, Spain
- Parent range: Pyrenees

Les Borregues is a mountain of Catalonia, Spain. Located in the Pyrenees, it has an altitude of 2692 metres above sea level.

Some maps and sources call it the alternate name Puig de Pastuira. Others identify Puig de Pastuira as a lower top on the south-eastern spur of Les Borregues.

== See also ==
- Mountains of Catalonia
