= Rabós =

- Municipality
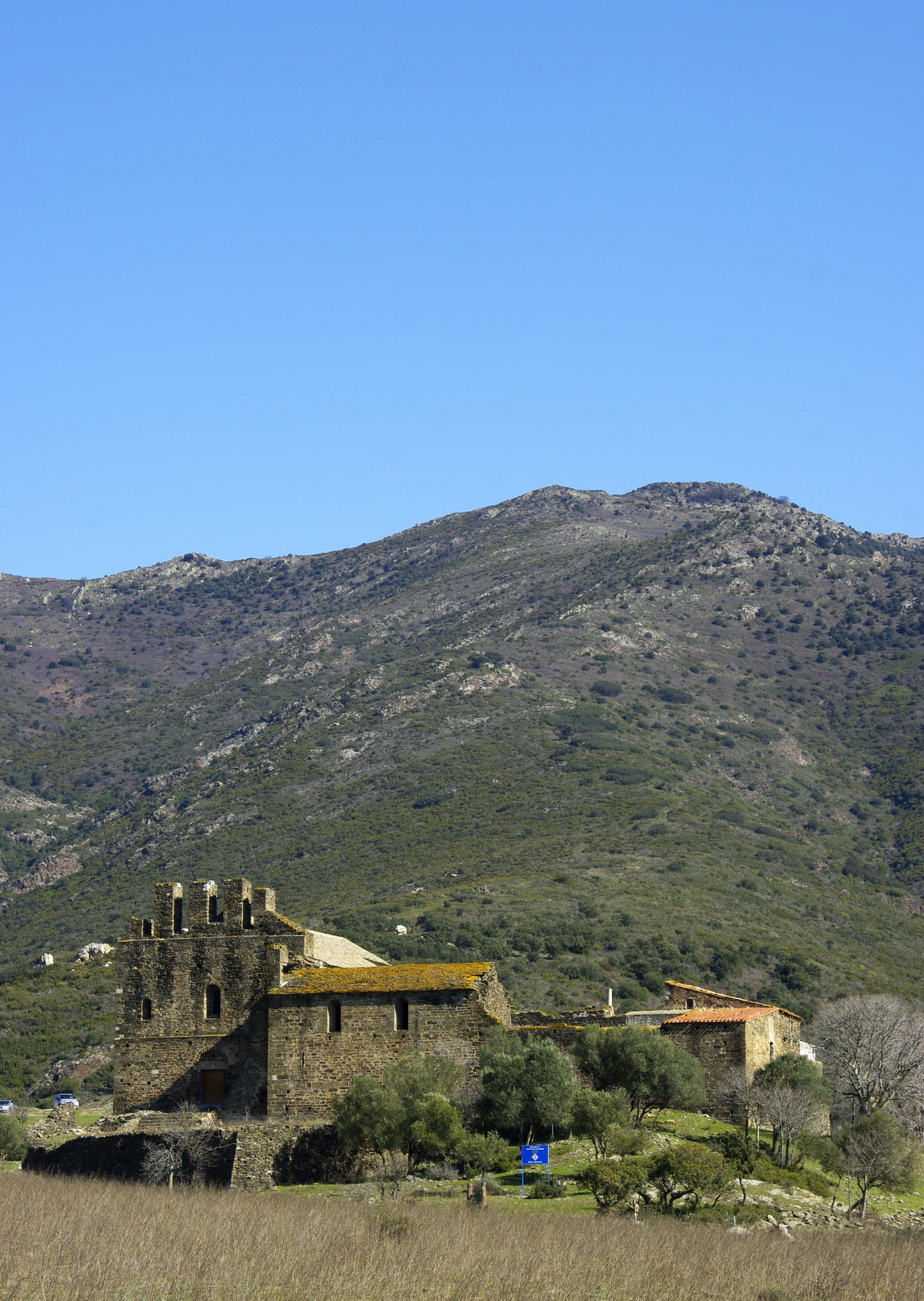
- The 9th century Rabós monastery of Sant Quirze de Colera

- Coat of arms

- Location in Catalonia Rabós (Spain)
- Coordinates: 42°23′N 3°2′E
- Country: Spain
- Community: Catalonia
- Province: Girona
- Comarca: Alt Empordà

Government
  - Mayor: Dominica Montiel Puig (2015)

Area
  - Total: 45.1 km^{2} (17.4 sq mi)

Population (2025-01-01)
  - Total: 232
  - Density: 5.14/km^{2} (13.3/sq mi)
- Website: www.rabos.cat

Rabós (Catalan pronunciation: [rəˈβos]) is a municipality in the comarca of Alt Empordà, Girona, Catalonia, Spain.

== See also ==
- Coll de Banyuls
