= Puig de l'Àliga (Sant Pere de Torelló) =

Mountain in Catalonia, Spain

Coordinates: 42°06′32″N 2°20′58″E

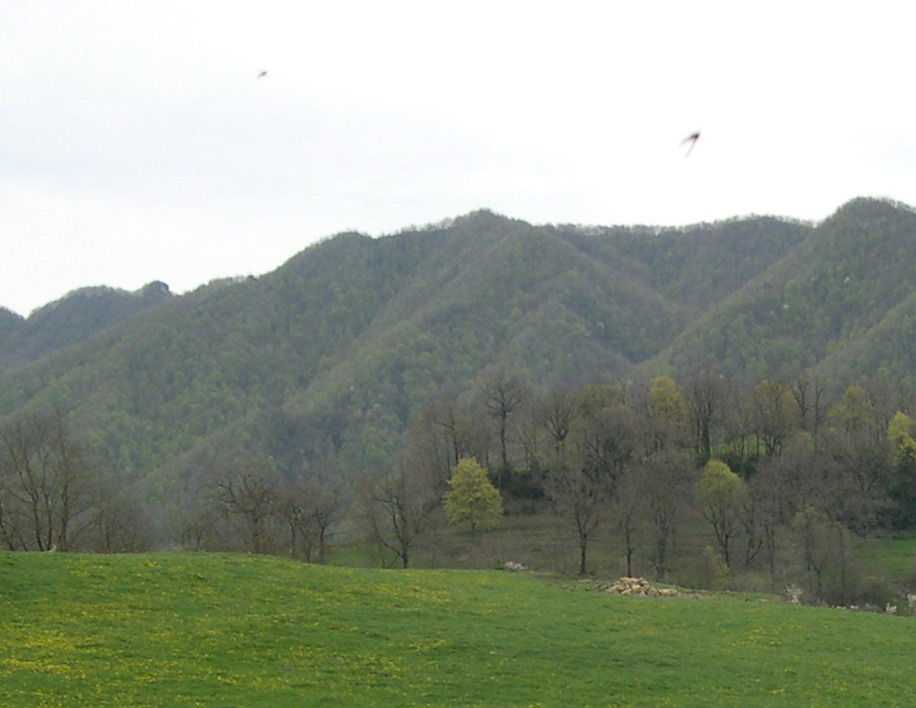
- Puig de l'Àliga as seen from Vidrà

Highest point
- Elevation: 1,344 m (4,409 ft)

Geography
- Location: Catalonia, Spain

Puig de l'Àliga (Sant Pere de Torelló) is a mountain of Catalonia, Spain. It has an elevation of 1,344 metres above sea level.

== See also ==
- Mountains of Catalonia
