= Sorède =

- Commune
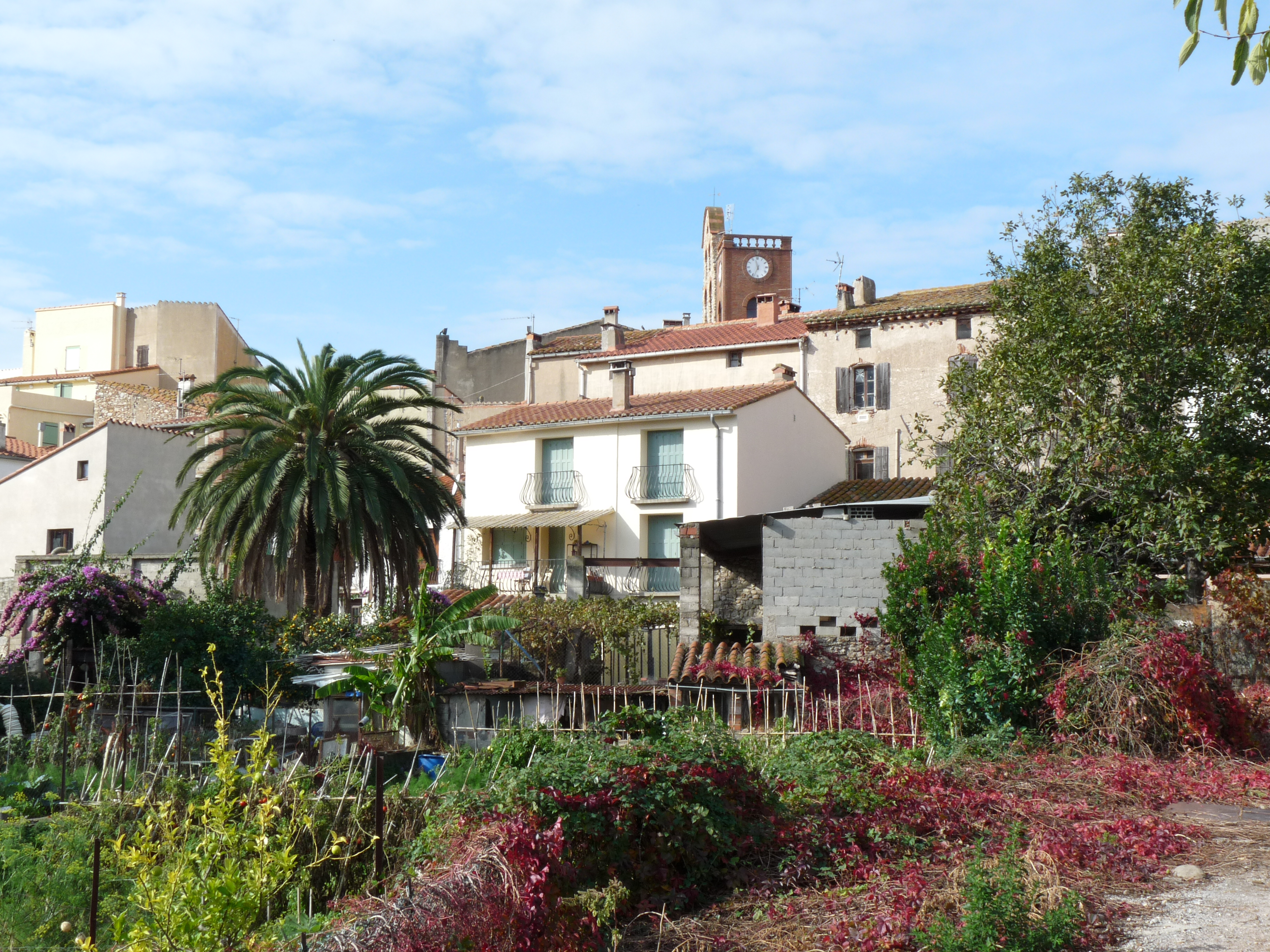
- A general view of the village of Sorède

- Coat of arms
- Location of Sorède
- Location within France Location within Occitanie
- Coordinates: 42°31′53″N 2°57′27″E
- Country: France
- Region: Occitania
- Department: Pyrénées-Orientales
- Arrondissement: Céret
- Canton: Vallespir-Albères
- Intercommunality: CC des Albères, de la Côte Vermeille et de l'Illibéris

Government
  - Mayor (2020–2026): Yves Porteix
- Area^{1}: 34.54 km^{2} (13.34 sq mi)
- Elevation: 80 m (260 ft)
- Highest elevation: 1,241 m (4,072 ft)
- Lowest elevation: 42 m (138 ft)
- Population (2023): 3,512
  - Density: 101.7/km^{2} (263.3/sq mi)
- Time zone: UTC+01:00 (CET)
  - Summer (DST): UTC+02:00 (CEST)
- INSEE/Postal code: 66196 /66690
- ^{1} French Land Register data, which excludes lakes, ponds, glaciers > 1 km^{2} (0.386 sq mi or 247 acres) and river estuaries.

Sorède (French pronunciation: [sɔʁɛd]; Catalan: Sureda, that is cork oak wood) is a commune in the Pyrénées-Orientales department in southern France.

== Geography ==
Sorède is located in the canton of Vallespir-Albères and in the arrondissement of Céret.

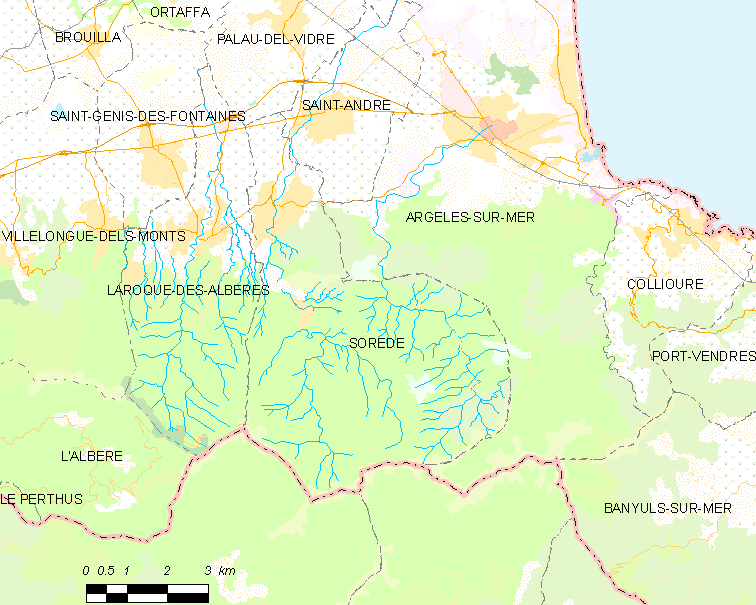
Map of Sorède and its surrounding communes

== Government and politics ==
=== Mayors ===
List of mayors
Period	Name	Party	Profession
1966–1989	André Cavaillé		
1989–incumbent	Yves Porteix	UDF/MoDem	Mayor & Vice-president of the Community of Communes

== Population ==
Historical population
Year	Pop.	±% p.a.
1968	1,164	—
1975	1,491	+3.60%
1982	1,896	+3.49%
1990	2,160	+1.64%
1999	2,699	+2.51%
2007	2,970	+1.20%
2012	3,083	+0.75%
2017	3,267	+1.17%
2023	3,512	+1.21%
Source: INSEE

== Sites of interest ==
- The main church "St Assiscle et Ste Victoire", 14th century choir, 17th century Baroque sculptures.
- Notre-Dame du Château, an 18th-century sanctuary dedicated to the Virgin Mary in the mountains, and the ruins of the castle of Ultrera, dating from the early Middle Ages.
- Saint Martin de Lavail, a 9th-century Romanesque chapel.
- Since the 13th century, whips have been made from the local celtis tree. Celtis whips are still made by hand today in Sorède and visitors can tour the workshop where they are made.

== Notable people ==
- Father Antonio Gomes, known as « Padre Himalaya », a Portuguese scientist and priest who experimented with one of the first solar ovens in Sorède in 1900.
- Philippe David Clarke - was one of the early winners of the Euro Millions Lottery in February 2004. Clarke won an estimated 19,000,000 Euros. He has lived between Sorède and Kent, UK for most of his life.

== See also ==
- Puig Neulós
- Communes of the Pyrénées-Orientales department
