= Puig de Fontnegra =

Mountain in Catalonia, Spain

Coordinates: 42°24′11″N 2°10′55″E

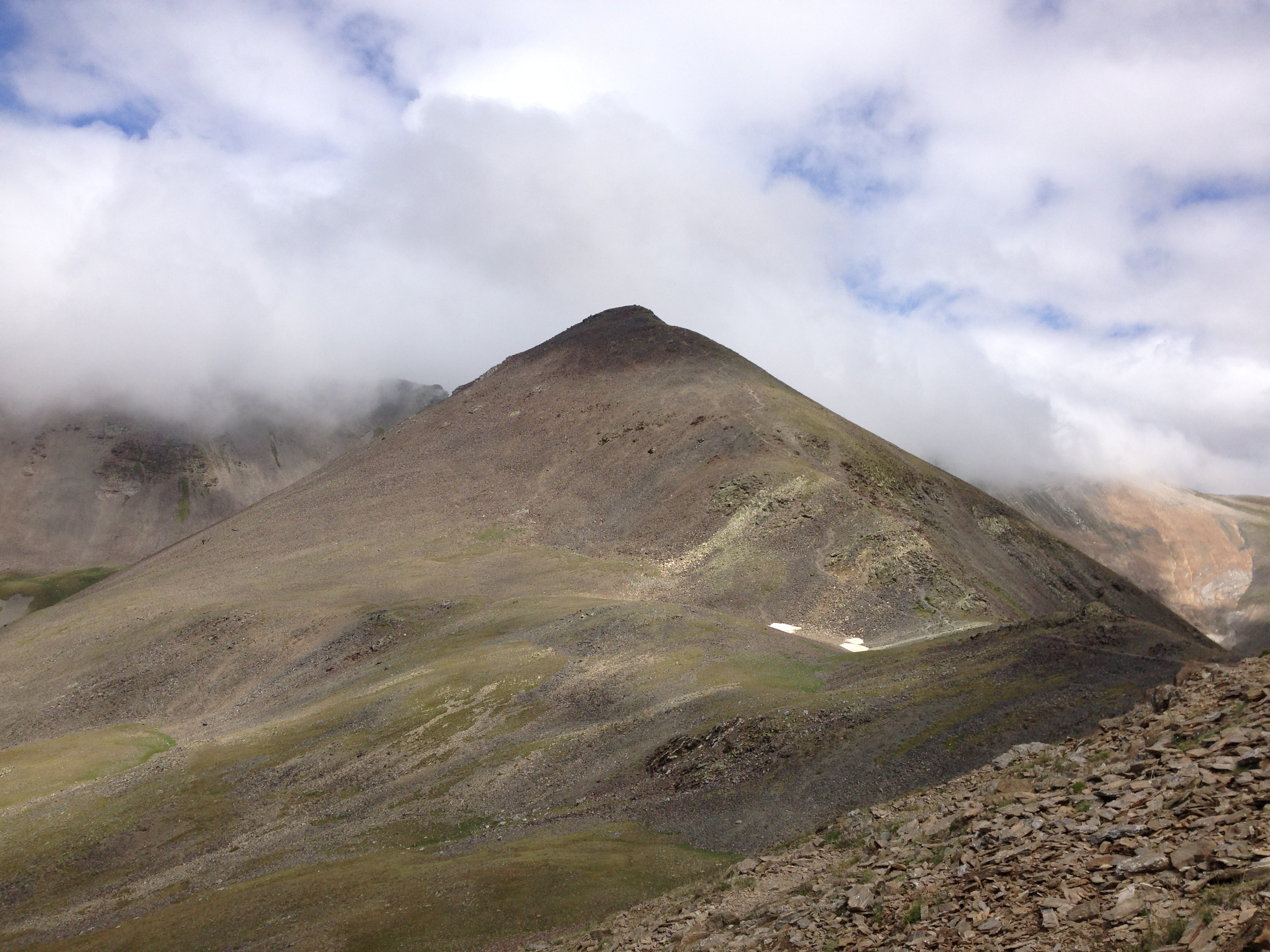

Highest point
- Elevation: 2,727 m (8,947 ft)

Geography
- Location within Spain
- Parent range: Pyrenees

Puig de Fontnegra is a mountain in Catalonia, Spain. Located in the Pyrenees, it has an elevation of 2,727 metres above sea level.

== See also ==
- Mountains of Catalonia
