= Puig de l'Obiol =

Mountain in Catalonia, Spain

Coordinates: 42°09′28″N 2°18′18″E

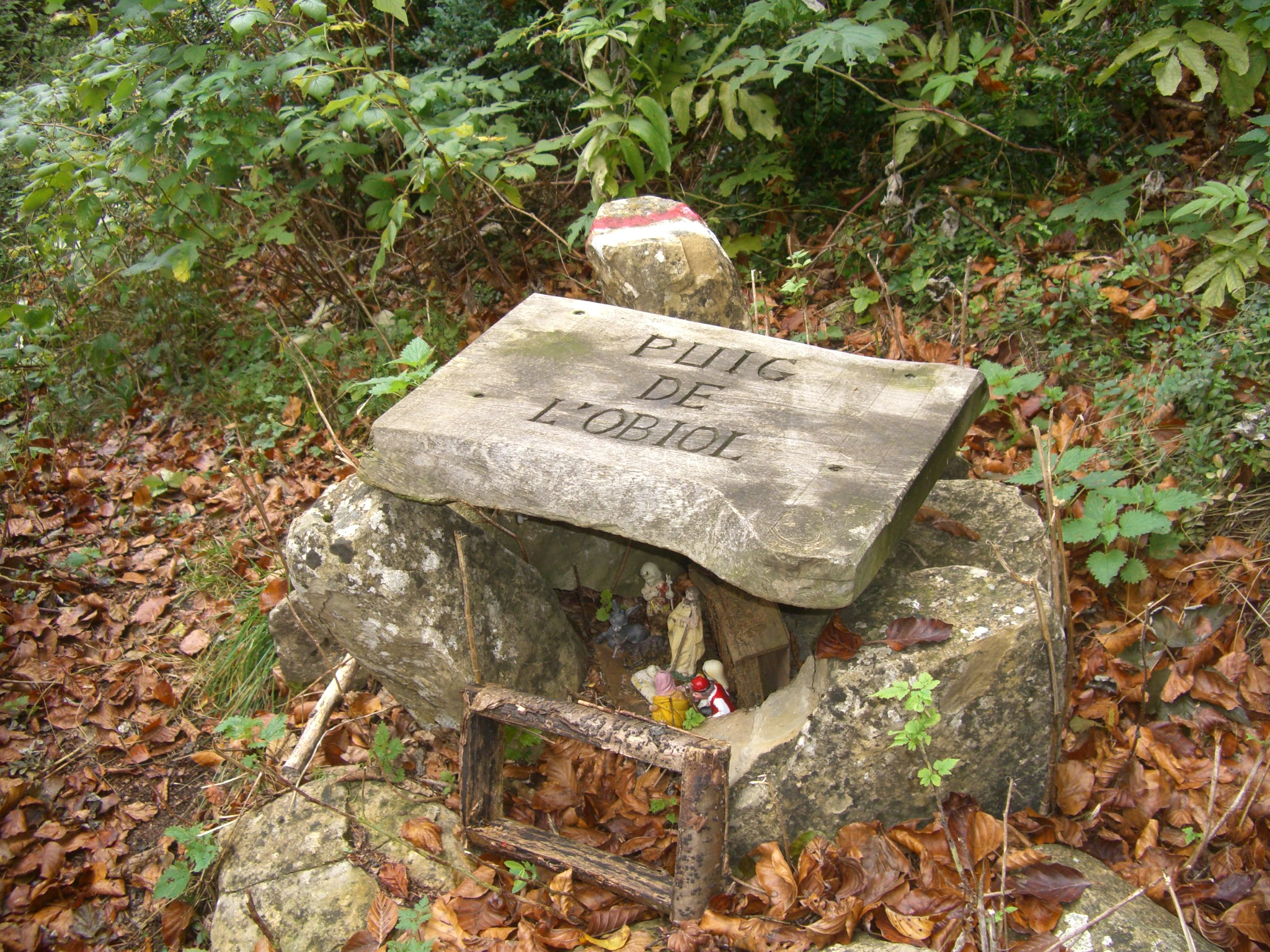
- Peak of the Puig de l'Obiol with a nativity scene

Highest point
- Elevation: 1,543 m (5,062 ft)

Geography
- Location: Catalonia, Spain

Puig de l'Obiol is a mountain of Catalonia, Spain. It has an elevation of 1,543 metres above sea level.

== See also ==
- Mountains of Catalonia
