= Puig Castellar (Balenyà) =

Mountain in Catalonia, Spain

Coordinates: 41°49′10″N 2°11′53″E

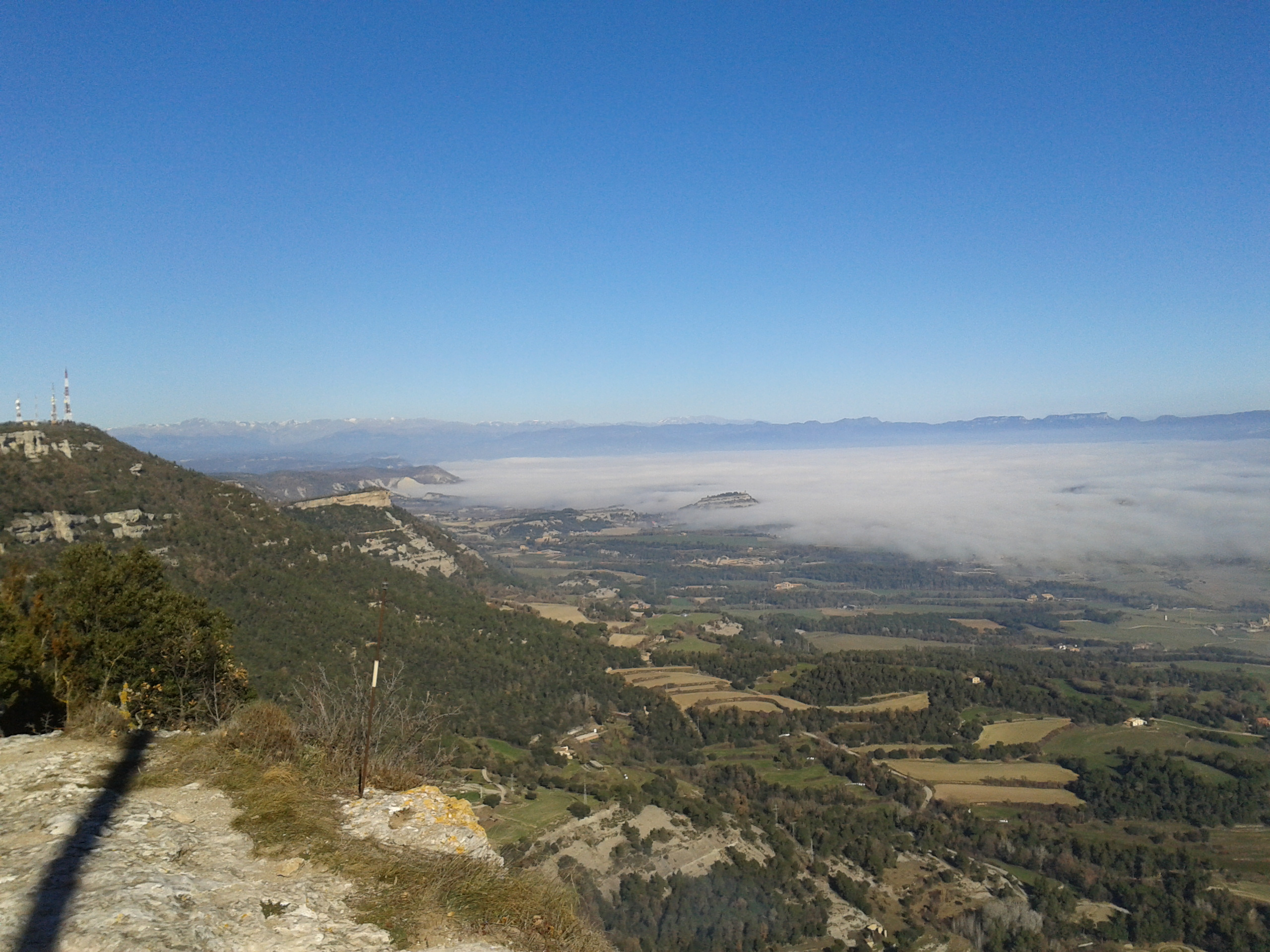
- The castellar, located in the background on the left with telecommunications towers located at the top

Highest point
- Elevation: 1,017 m (3,337 ft)

Geography
- Location: Catalonia, Spain

Puig Castellar (Balenyà) is a mountain of Catalonia, Spain. It has an elevation of 1,017 metres above sea level.

== See also ==
- Mountains of Catalonia
