= Sant Quirze de Colera =

Benedictine monastery in Rabós, Catalonia, Spain

Coordinates: 42.416233°N 3.058889°E

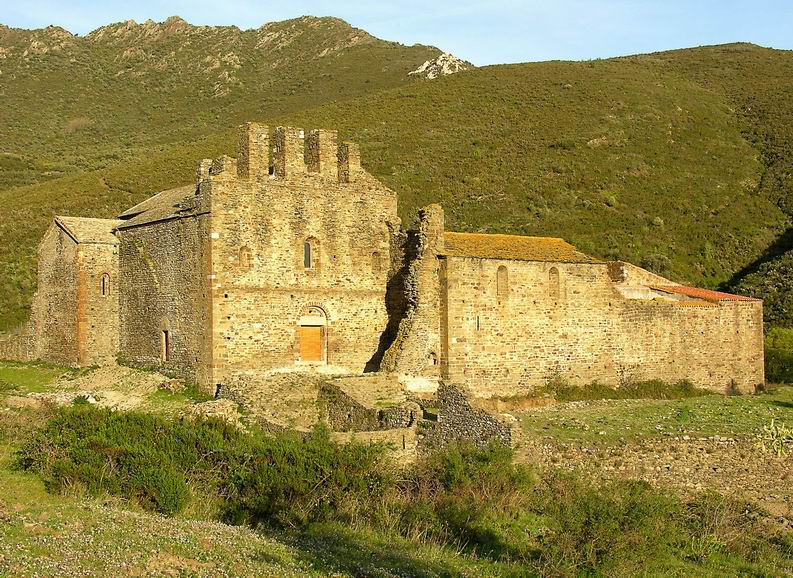
Sant Quirze de Colera

Sant Quirze de Colera is a Benedictine monastery in Rabós, Catalonia, Spain. The 9th-century building, in First Romanesque style, was declared a Bien de Interés Cultural landmark in 1931.

== Bibliography ==
- DDAA (2005). El Meu País, tots els pobles, viles i ciutats de Catalunya volumen 3. Barcelona, Edicions 62. ISBN 84-297-5570-5 (in Catalán).
