= L'Esportiu =

Sports newspaper

- Type: Daily newspaper
- Founded: 2 January 2002
- Language: Catalan
- Headquarters: Tàpies 2, Barcelona
- Price: Euro1
- Website: lesportiudecatalunya.cat

L'Esportiu, previously known as El 9 Esportiu (Catalan pronunciation: [əl ˈnɔw əspuɾˈtiw]), is a Catalan daily sports newspaper, based in Barcelona, Catalonia, Spain.

== History ==
The newspaper was founded on 2 January 2002, and being the unique Catalan language daily sports newspaper. In addition to selling individual, is also included in several newspapers as El Punt, Segre, Regió 7 and Diari d'Andorra.

El 9 esportiu offers three editions customized for Girona, Barcelona and Tarragona, which include all the information from the elite sport and sport for each local area. These editions are distributed in conjunction with the corresponding edition of the newspaper El Punt.

In 2003, was awarded with the National Award for the Social Projection of the Catalan language, granted by the Catalan government, in recognition of being "the first sports daily in catalan, which has contributed to the consolidation and growth of Catalan language in sport".
