= Puig Cerverís =

Coordinates: 42°20′13″N 2°13′24″E

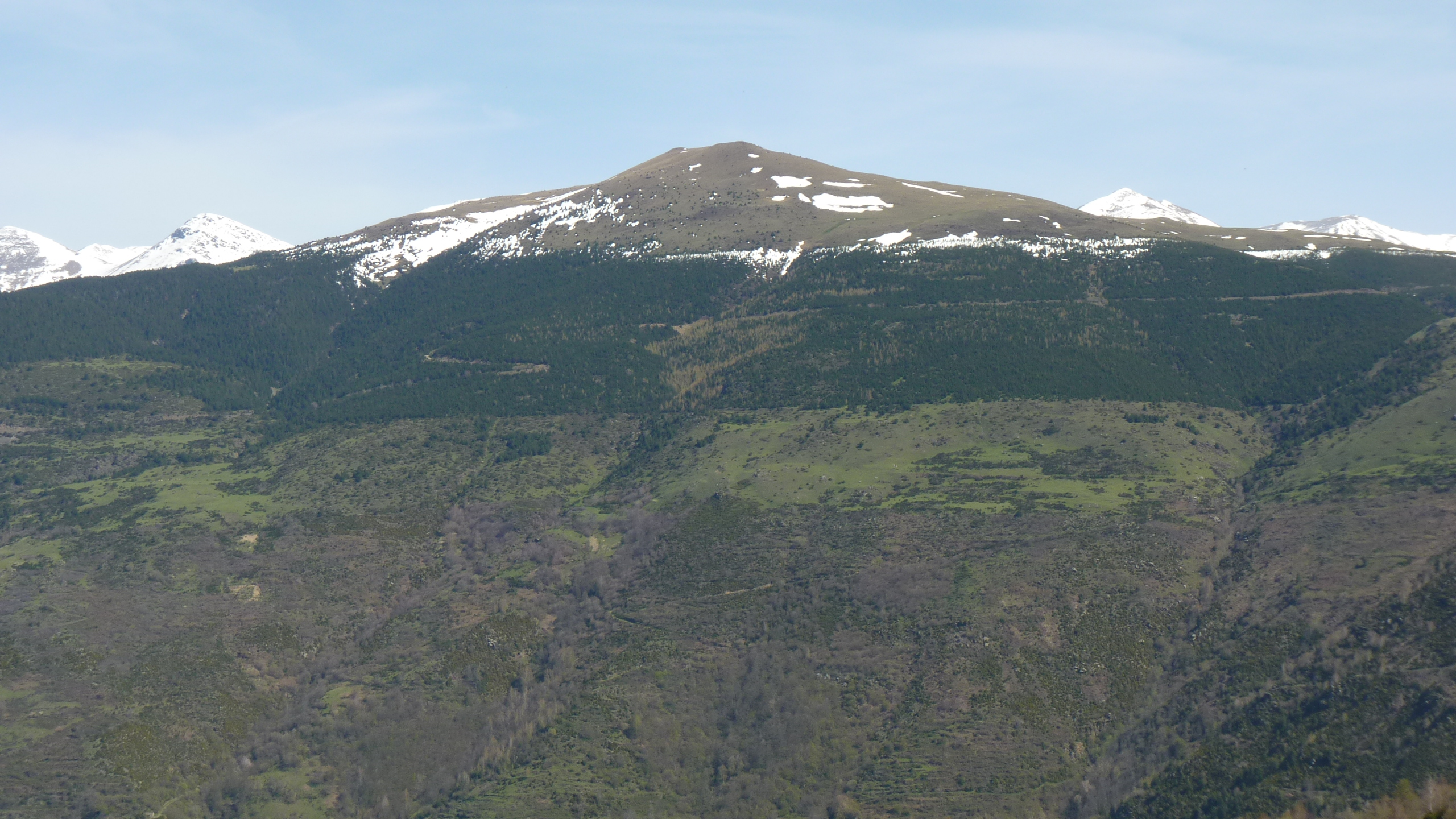

Highest point
- Elevation: 2,208 m (7,244 ft)

Geography
- Location: Catalonia, Spain
- Parent range: Pyrenees

Puig Cerverís is a mountain of Catalonia, Spain. Located in the Pyrenees, it has an elevation of 2,208 metres above sea level.

== See also ==
- Mountains of Catalonia
