= Puig de Pastuira =

Highest point
- Elevation: 2,692 m (8,832 ft)
- Coordinates: 42°23′20″N 2°15′54″E

Geography
- Location: Catalonia, Spain
- Parent range: Pyrenees

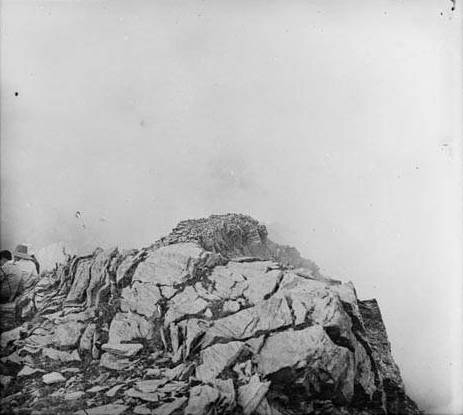
Summit on a foggy day in 1909

Puig de Pastuira is a mountain of Catalonia, Spain. It can be found to the north-west of the village of Setcases in the eastern Pyrenees.

Its exact location and summit is identified differently by different maps and sources. Some sources state that it is an alternative name for the mountain Les Borregues. This summit reaches an elevation of 2,692 m, and is located at 42.39462°N 2.2519°E.

Other sources and maps identify the summit as a point on the south-eastern spur of Les Borregues. This top has a height of between 2349m and 2373m, and is located at approximately 42.38901°N 2.26486°E. The Riu de Pastuira, or Torrent de Pastuira, is a stream which starts below this summit and runs south-east, joining the Ter south of Setcases.

== See also ==
- Mountains of Catalonia
