= Puig de Fontlletera =

Coordinates: 42°22′36″N 2°14′09″E

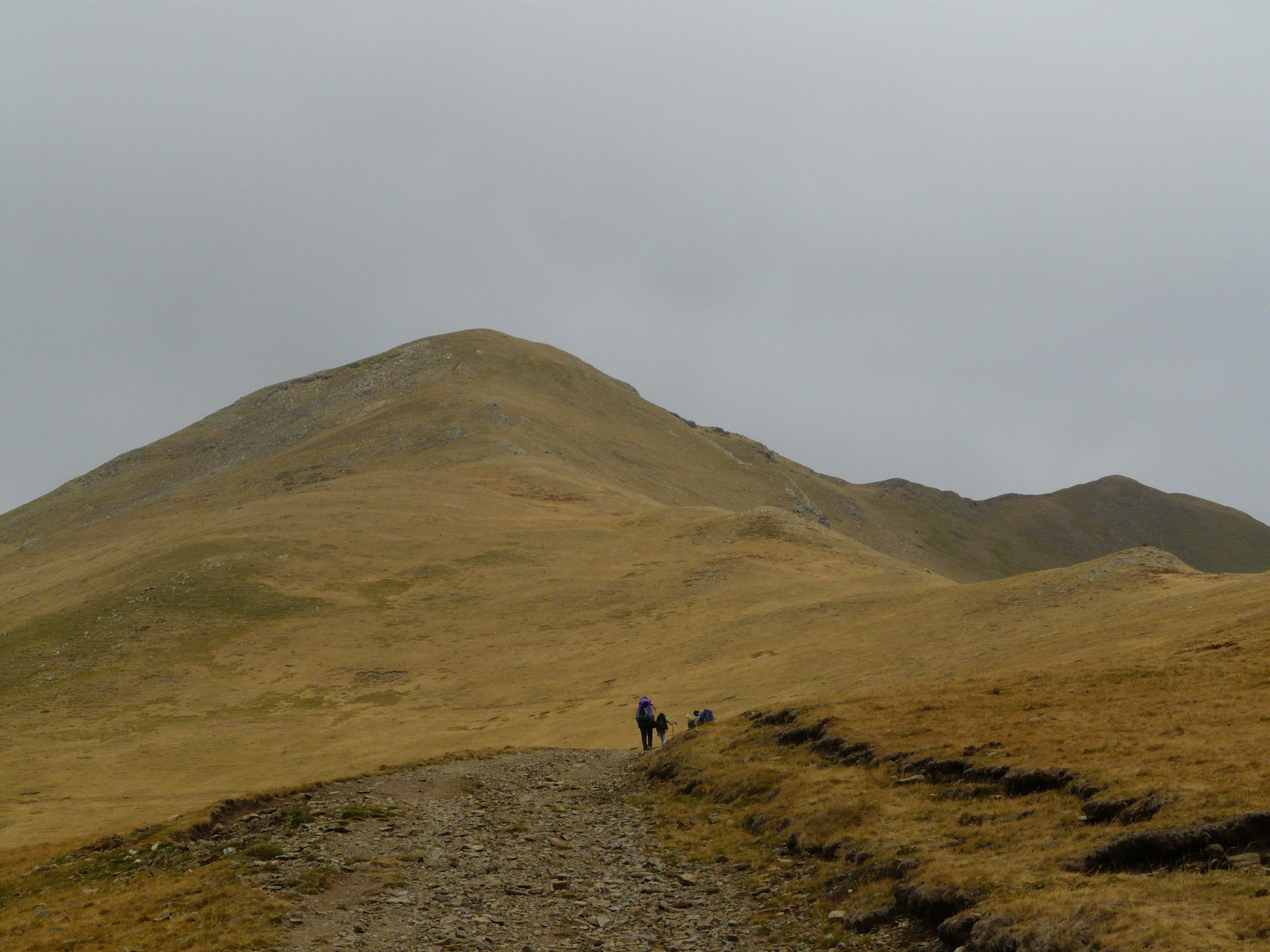

Highest point
- Elevation: 2,577 m (8,455 ft)

Geography
- Location: Catalonia, Spain
- Parent range: Pyrenees

Puig de Fontlletera is a mountain of Catalonia, Spain. Located in the Pyrenees, it has an elevation of 2,577 metres above sea level.

== See also ==
- Mountains of Catalonia
