= Puig Sesarques =

Coordinates: 42°04′58″N 2°40′52″E

Highest point
- Elevation: 880 m (2,890 ft)

Geography
- Location: Catalonia, Spain

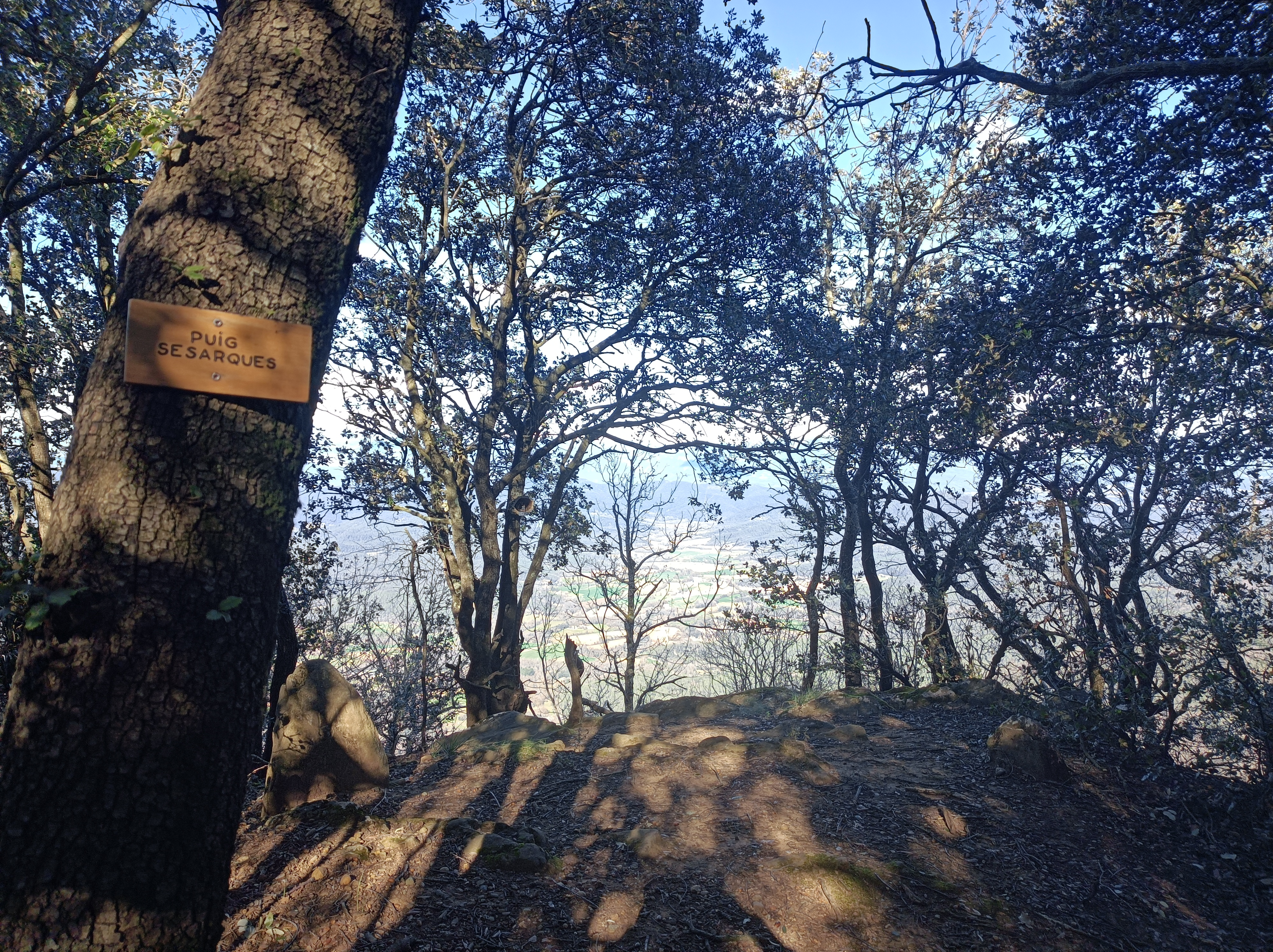
Puig Sesarques

Puig Sesarques is a mountain of Catalonia, Spain. It has an elevation of 880 metres above sea level.

== See also ==
- Mountains of Catalonia
