= Puig Estela =

Mountain in Catalonia, Spain

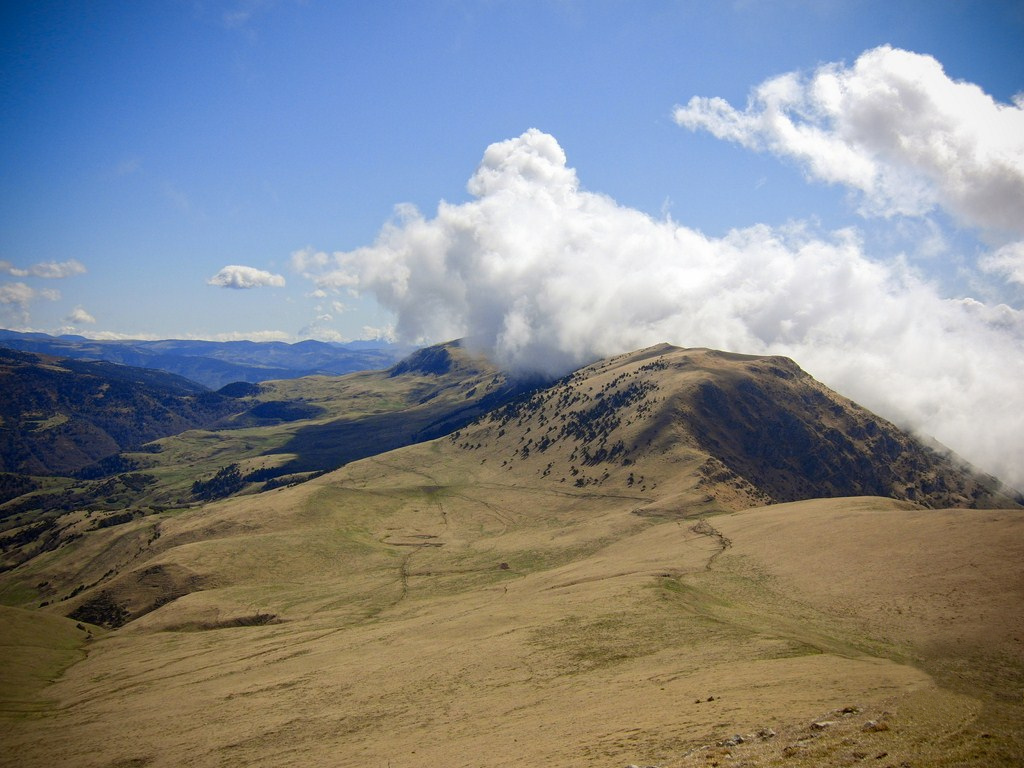

Highest point
- Elevation: 2,013 m (6,604 ft)
- Coordinates: 42°17′3.49″N 2°15′14.44″E

Geography
- Location: Catalonia, Spain

Climbing
- First ascent: unknown
- Easiest route: Portella d'Ogassa

Puig Estela is a mountain of Catalonia, Spain. It has an elevation of 2,013 metres above sea level., between the villages of Ogassa and Pardines.

== See also ==
- Mountains of Catalonia
