= Coll de Banyuls =

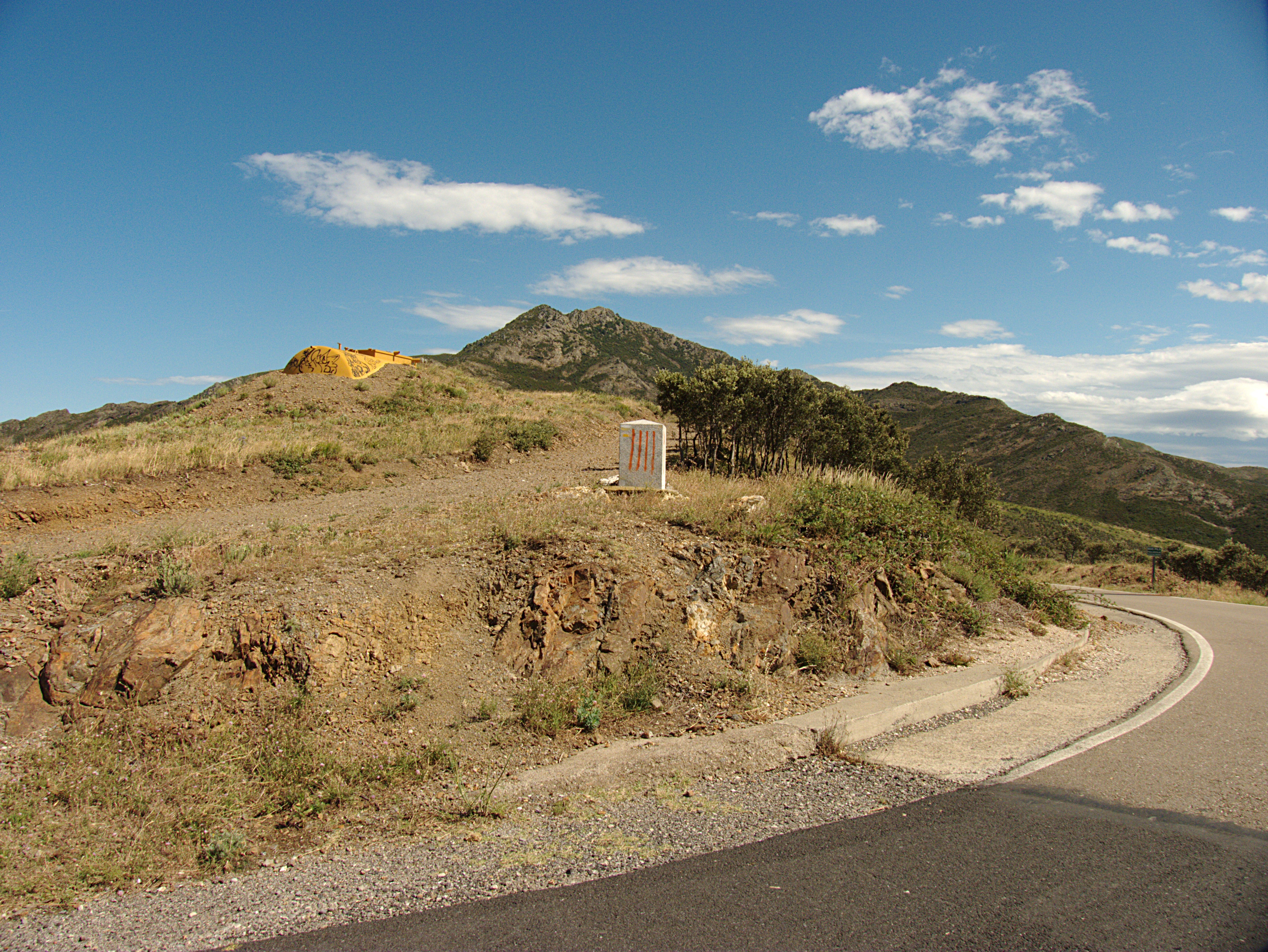
- Interactive map of Coll de Banyuls
- Elevation: 357 metres (1,171 ft)

Third Approach
- Location: Catalonia (Spain); Occitania (France)
- Range: Albera Massif
- Coordinates: 42°27′00″N 3°03′15″E

Coll de Banyuls (Catalan pronunciation: [ˈkɔʎ ðə βəˈɲuls]) is a mountain pass (and a border crossing) between France and Spain in the Albera Massif, the easternmost prolongation of the Pyrenees, helping to connect the Spanish municipality of Rabós (Alt Empordà, Catalonia) with the French commune of Banyuls-sur-Mer (Pyrénées-Orientales, Occitania). Its saddle point stands at about 357 metres above mean sea level. The pass was blocked with large rocks by the French government on 11 January 2021 and was kept closed under the pretext of "curbing irregular immigration and the terrorist threat".

A grassroots organization vowing to open the (closed) border crossings (Esborrem Fronteres) reopened it on 20 January 2023 by using an excavator.

== See also ==
- France–Spain border
