= Puig de la Talaia =

Mountain in Baix Penedès, Catalonia, Spain

- Location within Spain

Highest point
- Elevation: 861 m (2,825 ft)
- Coordinates: 41°20′13″N 1°28′17″E

Geography
- Location: Baix Penedès, Catalonia
- Parent range: Catalan Pre-Coastal Range

Climbing
- First ascent: Unknown
- Easiest route: From El Montmell

Puig de la Talaia is a mountain located in the El Montmell municipal term, in the Baix Penedès comarca, Catalonia, Spain. It has an elevation of 801 metres above sea level and is part of the Catalan Pre-Coastal Range.

Talaia, the name of the mountain, means "watchtower" in the Catalan language.

== See also ==
- Mountains of Catalonia
