= Puig-l'agulla =

Mountain in Catalonia, Spain

Coordinates: 41°52′59″N 2°19′41″E

Highest point
- Elevation: 810 m (2,660 ft)

Geography
- Location: Catalonia, Spain

Puig-l'agulla is a mountain of Catalonia, Spain. It has an elevation of 810 metres above sea level.

== See also ==
- Mountains of Catalonia
