= Puig de la Collada Verda =

Mountain in France

Coordinates: 42°27′13″N 2°23′46″E

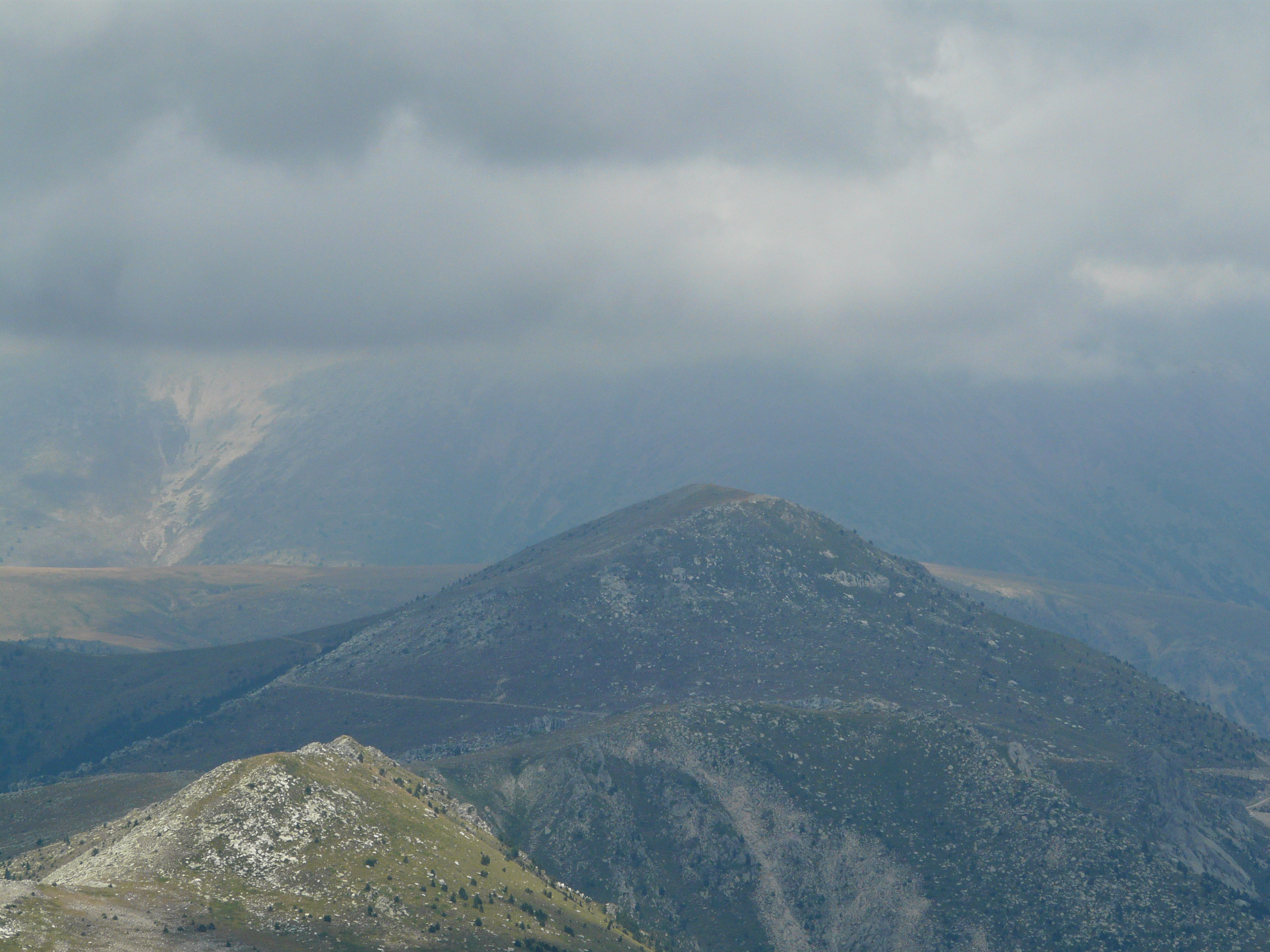

Highest point
- Elevation: 2,403 m (7,884 ft)

Geography

Puig de la Collada Verda is a mountain of France. It has an elevation of 2,403 metres above sea level.

== See also ==
- Mountains of Catalonia
