= Puig de Dòrria =

Coordinates: 42°21′42″N 2°05′05″E

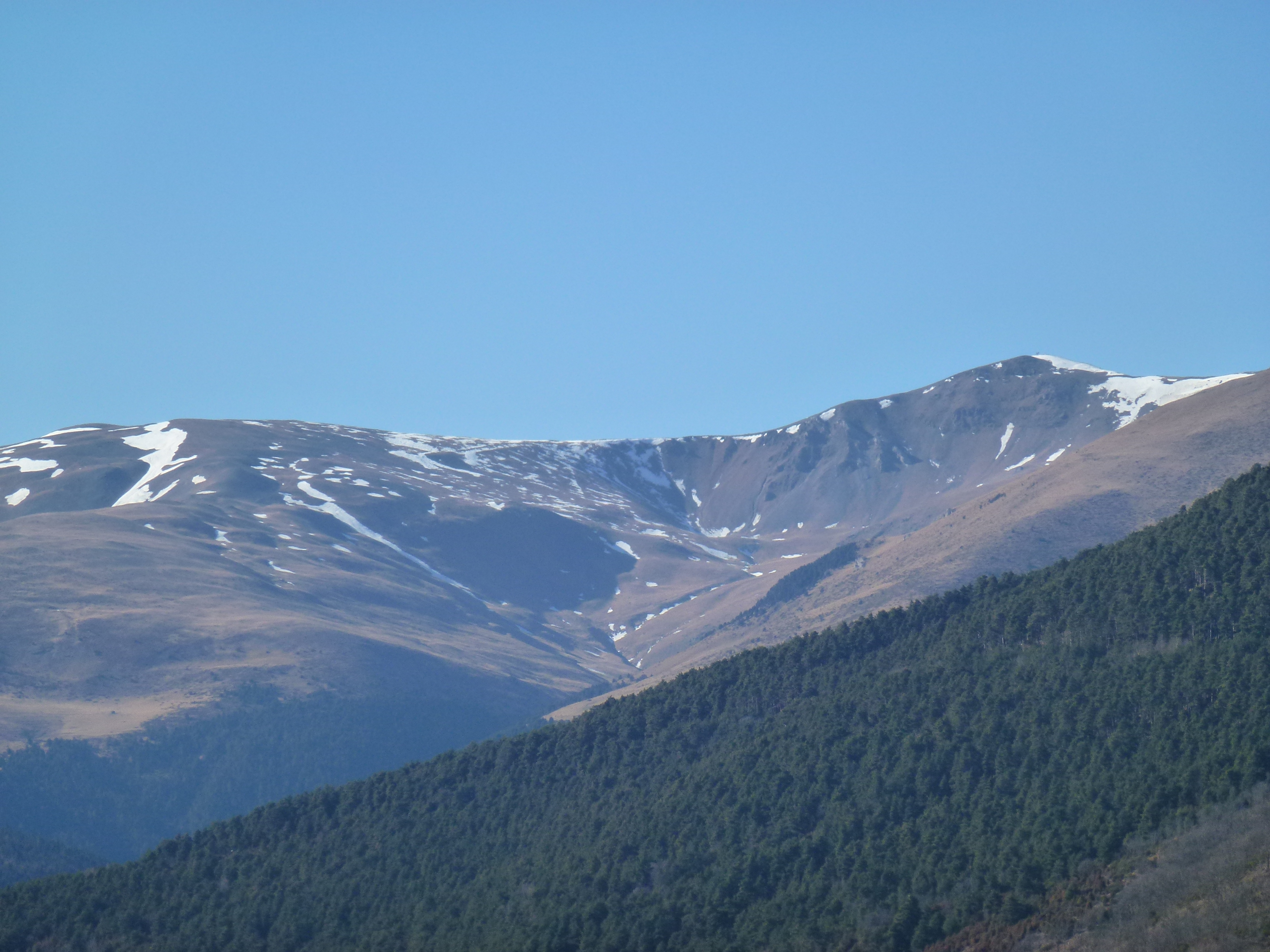

Highest point
- Elevation: 2,547 m (8,356 ft)

Geography
- Location: Catalonia, Spain, France
- Parent range: Pyrenees

Puig de Dòrria is a mountain of Catalonia, Spain and France. Located in the Pyrenees, it has an elevation of 2,547 metres (8,356 ft) above sea level. The mountain is part of the Parc Natural de les Capçaleres del Ter i del Freser in Spain and the Parc Naturel Régional des Pyrénées Catalanes in France.

== See also ==
- Mountains of Catalonia
