= Puig Neulós =

Mountain in La Jonquera, Catalonia, Spain

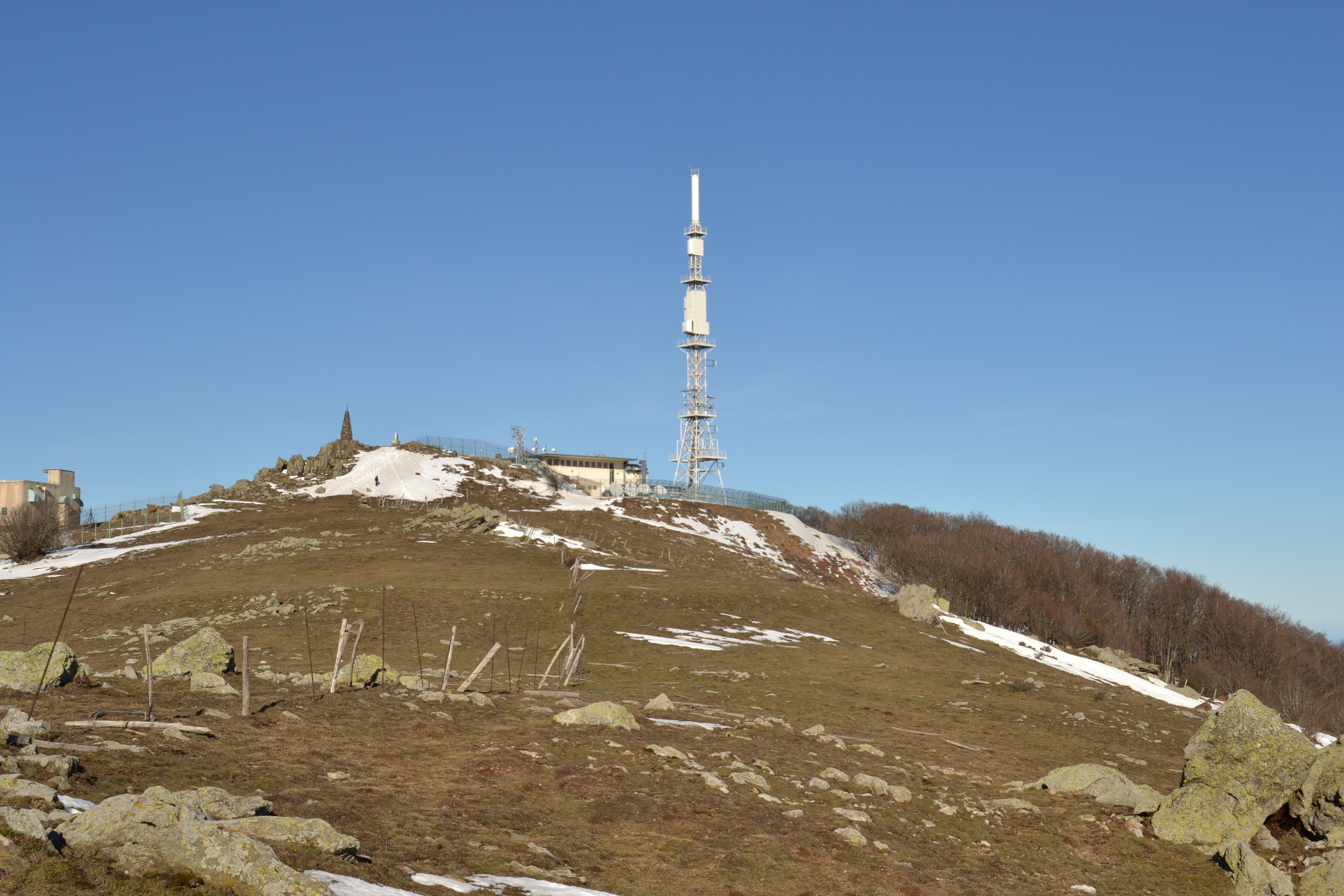
- Puig Neulós summit

Highest point
- Elevation: 1,256 m (4,121 ft)
- Coordinates: 42°28′55″N 2°56′49″E

Geography
- Location within Catalonia
- Location: La Jonquera (Alt Empordà); Sureda (Rosselló)
- Parent range: Albera Range

Climbing
- First ascent: Unknown
- Easiest route: From La Roca d'Albera

Puig Neulós (Catalan pronunciation: [ˈpudʒ‿nəwˈlos]; French: Pic du Néoulous) is the highest peak of the Albera Range, an eastern extension of the Pyrenees in Catalonia, straddling France and Spain. Antennas crown its summit. A paved road on the French side is restricted to military use.

== Geography ==
It reaches 1,256 meters above sea level.

Most of the southern side of the range lies within the Paratge Natural d'Interès Nacional de l'Albera natural reserve.

From Coll de l'Aranyó (899 m), the steep Roc del Migdia (872 m) is visible to the right of the peak. Below, along a ridge line, lies the prominent Roc du Midi and, to the west, the southwest-facing Roc Fouirous outcrop.

== History ==
A man-made rock formation, La Reyne de las Founs, encircles a water source on the mountain. Built by 19th-century shepherd Emmanuel Coste, known as Manel, it bears the inscription “les douaniers ici trouvent souvent ce qu'ils cherchent”. Smugglers later used pebble formations to encode messages about nearby customs officials.

== Toponymy ==
The Catalan name Puig Neulós persists in French. Derived from Latin podium, Puig translates to “puy,” denoting a rounded summit. Neulós relates to French “nébuleux”, meaning “cloud-covered.” A 1322 text references the peak as Podio Nebuloso in Latin, carrying the same meaning. IGN maps list it as Puig Neulós or the slightly French Pic Neulos. The Northern Catalan pronunciation, Néoulous, also appears in literature.

== See also ==
- Paratge Natural d'Interès Nacional de l'Albera
- Mountains of Catalonia
