= Puig de Bassegoda =

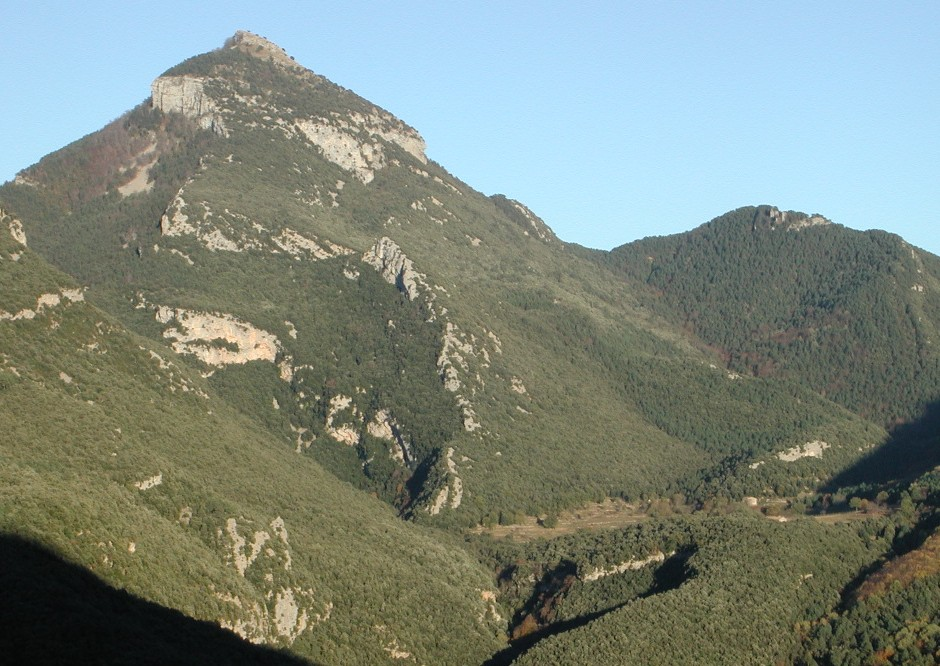

Highest point
- Elevation: 1,373 m (4,505 ft)
- Coordinates: 42°18′50.75″N 2°37′56.42″E

Geography
- Location: Alt Empordà, Garrotxa, Catalonia
- Parent range: Pyrenees

Climbing
- First ascent: Unknown

Puig de Bassegoda is a mountain of Catalonia, Spain. It has an elevation of 1,373 metres (4,505 ft) above sea level.

== See also ==
- Mountains of Catalonia
