= Puig Cornador (Vilanova de Sau) =

Coordinates: 41.9444°N 2.4093°E

Highest point
- Elevation: 621 m (2,037 ft)

Geography
- Location: Catalonia, Spain

Puig Cornador (Vilanova de Sau) is a mountain of Catalonia, Spain. It has an elevation of 621 metres above sea level.

== See also ==
- Mountains of Catalonia
