= Puy =

Term for a volcanic hill in Auvergne, France

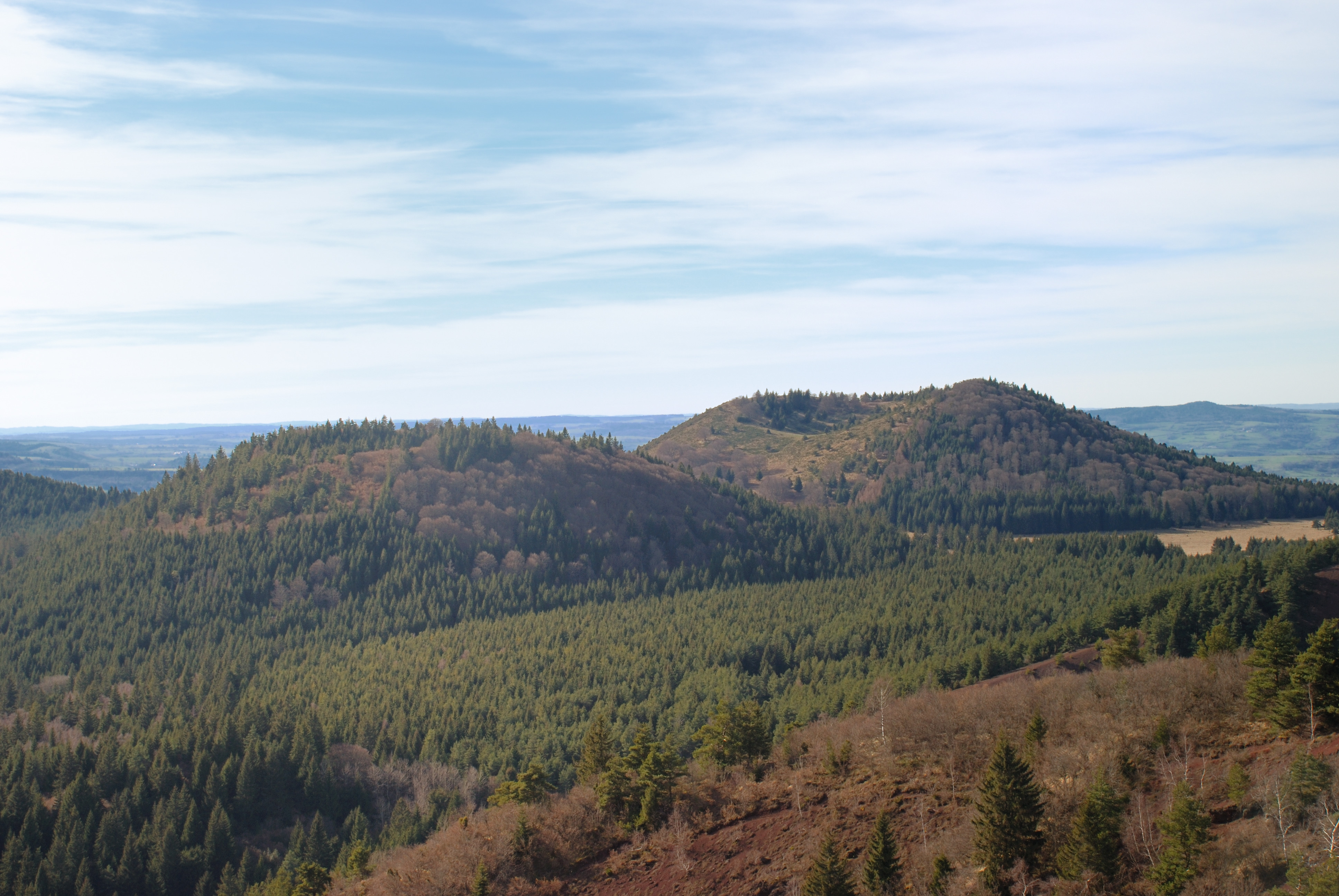
Puy de Montjuger and Puy de Pourcharet, Puy-de-Dôme, France.

Puy (French pronunciation: [pɥi]) is a geological term used locally in the Auvergne, France for a volcanic hill. The word derives from the Provençal puech, meaning an isolated hill, coming from Latin podium, which has given also puig in Catalan, poggio in Italian, poio in Galician and Portuguese.

Most of the puys of central France are small cinder cones, with or without associated lava, whilst others are domes of trachytic rock, like the domite of the Puy-de-Dôme. The puys may be scattered as isolated hills, or, as is more usual, clustered together, sometimes in lines. The chain of puys in central France probably became extinct in late prehistoric time.

Other volcanic hills more or less like those of Auvergne are also known to geologists as puys; examples may be found in the Eifel and in the small cones on the Bay of Naples, whilst the relics of puys denuded by erosion are numerous in the Swabian Alps of Württemberg, as pointed out by W. Branco. Sir A. Geikie has shown that the puy type of eruption was common in the British area in Carboniferous and Permian times, as abundantly attested in central Scotland by remains of the old volcanoes, now generally reduced by denudation to the mere neck, or volcanic vent, filled with tuff and agglomerate, or plugged with lava.

== See also ==
- Puig (disambiguation)
