= Puig Cornador (Sant Sadurní d'Osormort) =

Coordinates: 41°54′26″N 2°23′23″E

Highest point
- Elevation: 859 m (2,818 ft)

Geography
- Location: Catalonia, Spain

Puig Cornador (Sant Sadurní d'Osormort) is a mountain of Catalonia, Spain. It has an elevation of 859 metres above sea level.

== See also ==
- Mountains of Catalonia
