= Puig Cornador (Ribes de Freser) =

Coordinates: 42°19′53″N 2°11′59″E

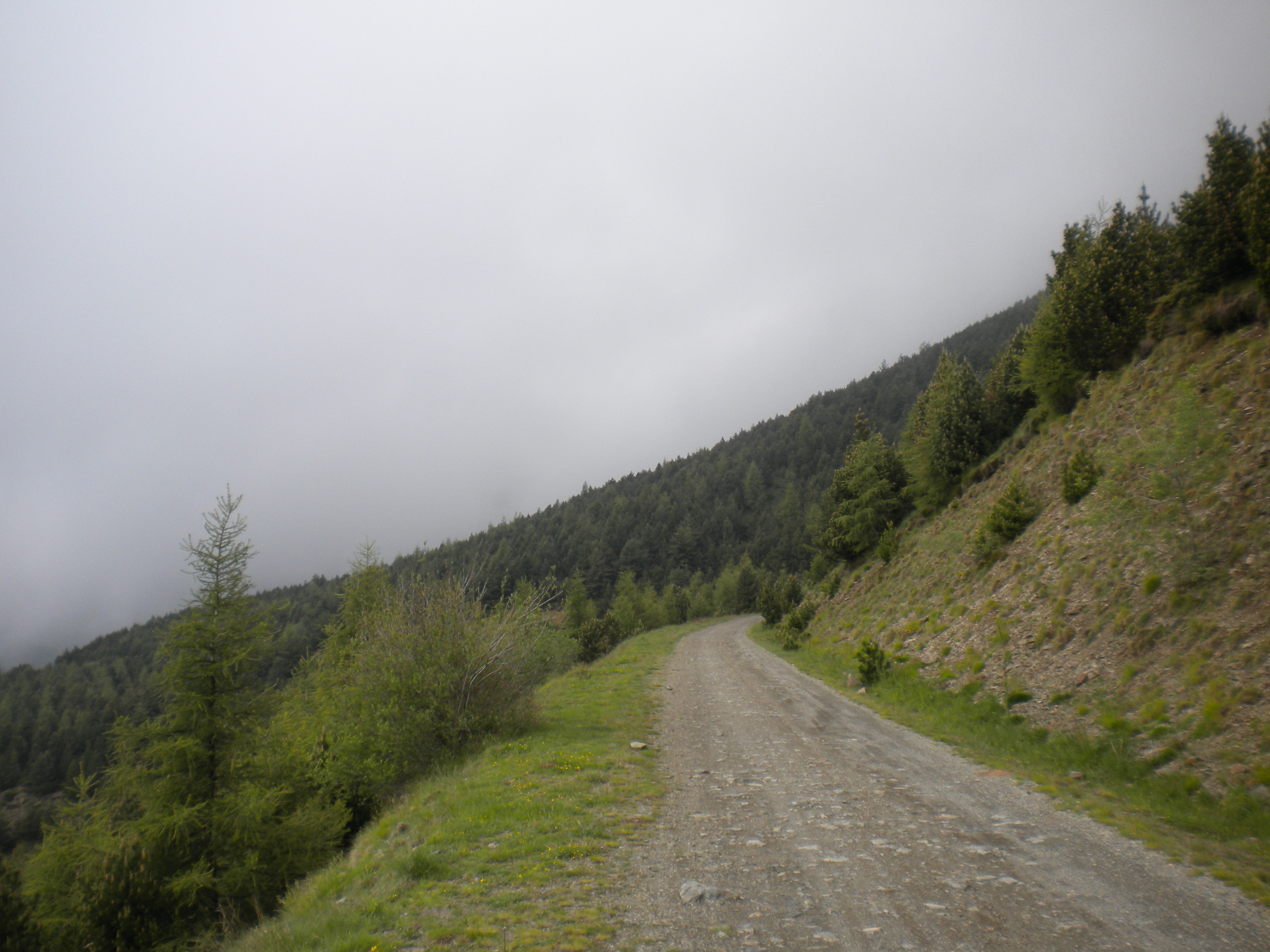
- Track on the southern slope of the Puig Cornador

Highest point
- Elevation: 1,799 m (5,902 ft)

Geography
- Location: Catalonia, Spain

Puig Cornador (Ribes de Freser) is a mountain of Catalonia, Spain. It has an elevation of 1,799 metres above sea level.

== See also ==
- Mountains of Catalonia
