= Puig Cornador (Les Llosses) =

Coordinates: 42°08′23″N 2°06′30″E

Highest point
- Elevation: 1,229 m (4,032 ft)

Geography
- Location: Catalonia, Spain

Puig Cornador (Les Llosses) is a mountain of Catalonia, Spain. It has an elevation of 1,229 metres (4,032 ft) above sea level.

== See also ==
- Mountains of Catalonia
