= French Cerdagne =

Northern half of Cerdanya

Coordinates: 42°30′N 1°58′E

French Cerdagne, also known as Upper Cerdanya (French: Haute-Cerdagne, IPA: [ot sɛʁdaɲ]; Catalan: Alta Cerdanya, IPA: [ˈaltə səɾˈðaɲə]; Occitan: Alta Cerdanha), is the northern half of Cerdanya, which came under French control as a result of the Treaty of the Pyrenees in 1659, while the southern half remained in Spain (as a part of Catalonia). It is the only French territory on the Iberian Peninsula, as it is located on the south side of the Pyrenees Range between France and Spain. For example, the Segre river, which goes west and then south to meet the Ebro, has its source in the French Cerdagne. An inadvertent result of the Treaty of the Pyrenees is the Spanish municipality of Llívia, which is an exclave completely surrounded by French Cerdagne.

French Cerdagne (highlighted) on a map of the Pyrénées-Orientales department in France.

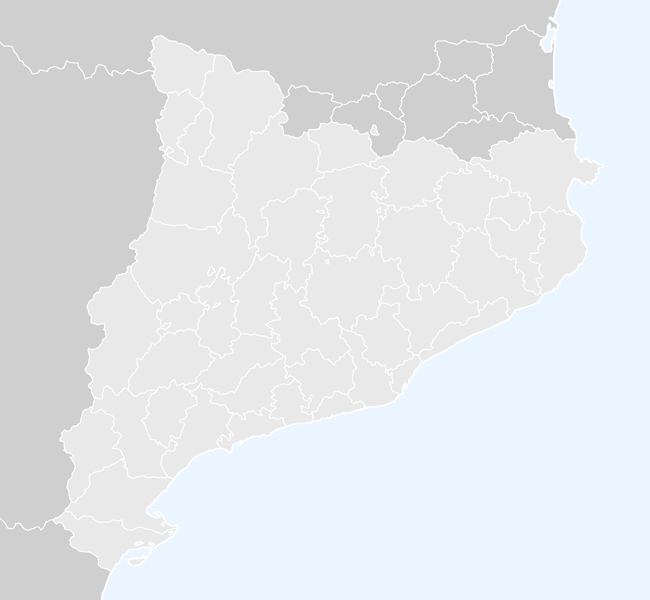
Map of Catalonia and the historical comarques.

French Cerdagne has no special status inside France, simply forming a physiographic region within the department of Pyrénées-Orientales, unlike the Spanish part of Cerdanya, which is officially a Catalan comarca called simply Cerdanya. In France, the French area is referred to as either Cerdagne française (i.e. "French Cerdagne"), Haute-Cerdagne (i.e. "Upper Cerdagne") or just Cerdagne.

French Cerdagne has a land area of 539.67 km² (208.37 sq. miles). Its 1999 population was 12,035, resulting in a density of only 22 people per km^{2} (58 per sq. mile). The area has the most cloud-free days in France, and was therefore chosen as the place to build:

- the Odeillo solar furnace (official site), used for high-temperature scientific experiments;
- the Thémis experimental solar power plant (operated by EDF from 1983 to 1986); it is now decommissioned as a power plant, but is being used as a Cherenkov telescope for the detection of gamma rays.

== Communes ==
There are 26 communes in French Cerdagne, all of them are parts of the canton of Les Pyrénées catalanes, in the arrondissement of Prades. Below is a list of the communes in alphabetical order. The population data are extracted from the 1999 French census (unless otherwise stated).

1. Angoustrine-Villeneuve-des-Escaldes (Catalan: Angostrina) – pop. 549
2. Bolquère (Catalan: Bolquera) – pop. 730 (779 at the 2004 census)
3. Bourg-Madame (Catalan: La Guingueta d’Ix) – pop. 1,166 (1,198 at the 2004 census)
4. Dorres – pop. 219
5. Égat (Catalan Èguet) – pop. 494 (475 at the 2004 census)
6. Enveitg (Catalan Enveig) – pop. 621
7. Err (Catalan Er) – pop. 551
8. Estavar – pop. 409
9. Eyne (Catalan Eina) – pop. 127 (161 at the 2004 census)
10. Font-Romeu-Odeillo-Via (Catalan Font-Romeu, Odelló i Vià) – pop. 2,003
11. La Cabanasse (Catalan La Cabanassa) – pop. 622 (756 at the 2004 census)
12. Latour-de-Carol (Catalan La Tor de Querol) – pop. 367
13. Llo – pop. 133
14. Mont-Louis (Catalan Montlluís) – pop. 270
15. Nahuja (Catalan Naüja) – pop. 63
16. Osséja (Catalan Osseja) – pop. 1,282
17. Palau-de-Cerdagne (Catalan Palau de Cerdanya) – pop. 424 (496 at the 2004 census)
18. Planès – pop. 27
19. Porta – pop. 98
20. Porté-Puymorens (Catalan Portè) – pop. 147
21. Saillagouse (Catalan Sallagosa) – pop. 820
22. Saint-Pierre-dels-Forcats (Catalan Sant Pere dels Forcats) – pop. 213
23. Sainte-Léocadie (Catalan Santa Llocaia) – pop. 140
24. Targassonne (Catalan Targasona) – pop. 203 (194 at the 2004 census)
25. Ur – pop. 308
26. Valcebollère (Catalan: Vallsabollera) – pop. 49

== See also ==
- Cerdanya
- Northern Catalonia
