= Canton of Mont-Louis =

Coordinates: 42.5092°N 2.1208°E

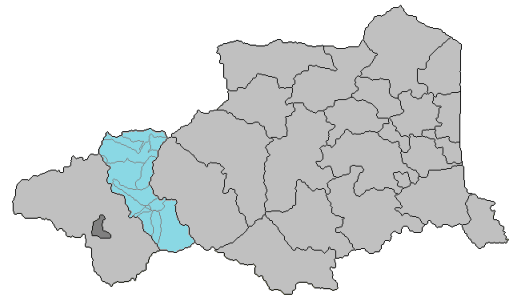
Location of the canton in Pyrénées-Orientales

The Canton of Mont-Louis is a French former canton of the Pyrénées-Orientales department, in the Languedoc-Roussillon region. It had 3,970 inhabitants (2012). It was disbanded following the French canton reorganisation which came into effect in March 2015. It consisted of 15 communes, which joined the new canton of Les Pyrénées catalanes in 2015.

The canton comprised the following communes:

- Mont-Louis
- Les Angles
- Bolquère
- La Cabanasse
- Caudiès-de-Conflent
- Fontpédrouse
- Fontrabiouse
- Formiguères
- La Llagonne
- Matemale
- Planès
- Puyvalador
- Réal
- Saint-Pierre-dels-Forcats
- Sauto
