= Arrondissement of Prades =

Coordinates: 42°36′54″N 2°25′25″E

Prades
- Arrondissement
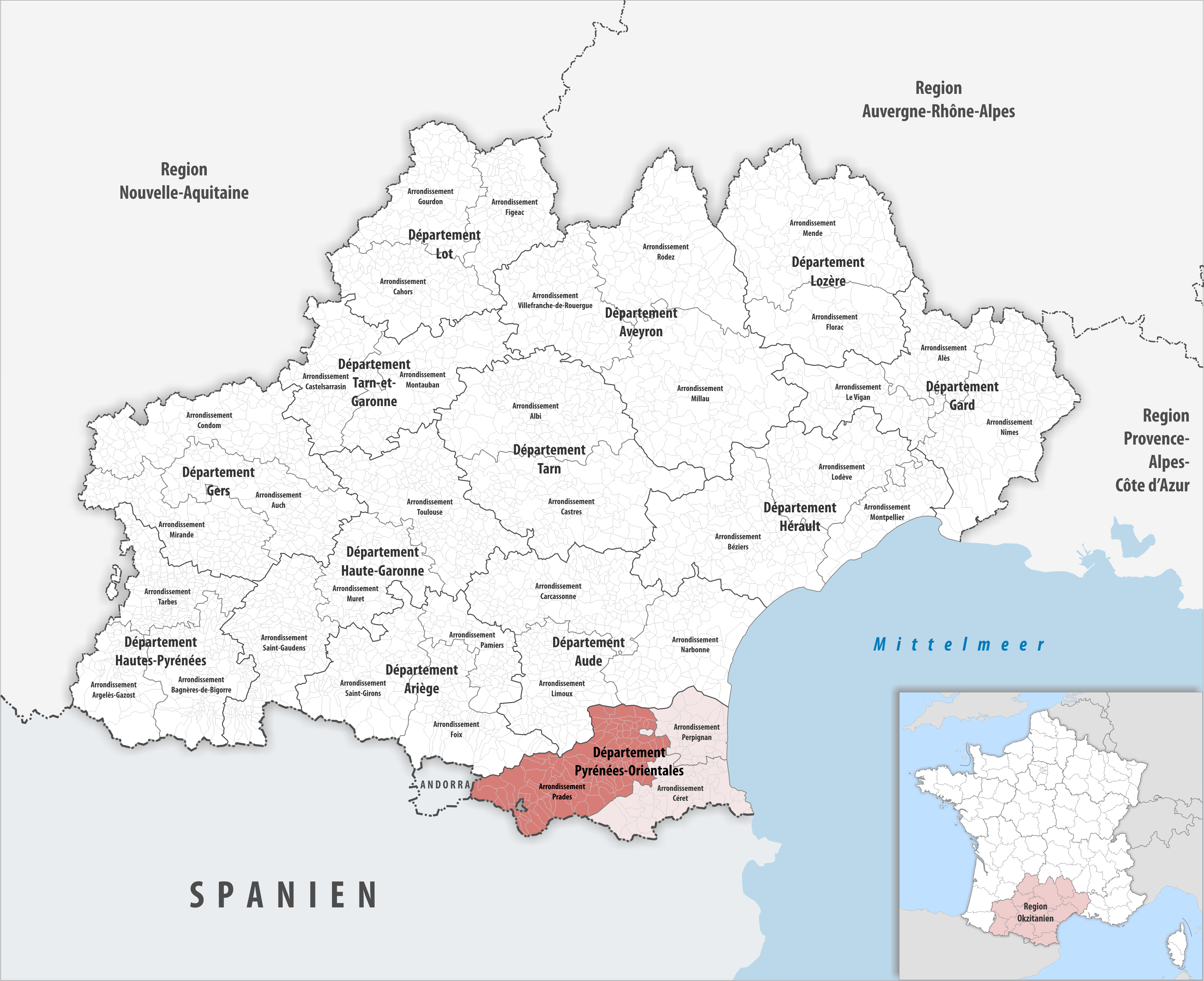
- Location within the region Occitanie
- Country: France
- Region: Occitania
- Department: Pyrénées-Orientales
- No. of communes: {{{nbcomm}}}
- Area: 2,181.4 km^{2} (842.2 sq mi)
- Population (2023): 59,467
  - Density: 27.261/km^{2} (70.605/sq mi)
- INSEE code: 663

The arrondissement of Prades is an arrondissement of France in the Pyrénées-Orientales department (Northern Catalonia) in the Occitanie region. It has 123 communes. Its population is 60,536 (2021), and its area is 2,181.4 km^{2} (842.2 sq mi).

== Composition ==
The communes of the arrondissement of Prades, and their INSEE codes, are:

1. Les Angles (66004)
2. Angoustrine-Villeneuve-des-Escaldes (66005)
3. Ansignan (66006)
4. Arboussols (66007)
5. Ayguatébia-Talau (66010)
6. Baillestavy (66013)
7. Bélesta (66019)
8. Bolquère (66020)
9. Boule-d'Amont (66022)
10. Bouleternère (66023)
11. Bourg-Madame (66025)
12. La Cabanasse (66027)
13. Campôme (66034)
14. Campoussy (66035)
15. Canaveilles (66036)
16. Caramany (66039)
17. Casefabre (66040)
18. Casteil (66043)
19. Catllar (66045)
20. Caudiès-de-Conflent (66047)
21. Caudiès-de-Fenouillèdes (66046)
22. Clara-Villerach (66051)
23. Codalet (66052)
24. Conat (66054)
25. Corbère (66055)
26. Corbère-les-Cabanes (66056)
27. Corneilla-de-Conflent (66057)
28. Corneilla-la-Rivière (66058)
29. Dorres (66062)
30. Égat (66064)
31. Enveitg (66066)
32. Err (66067)
33. Escaro (66068)
34. Espira-de-Conflent (66070)
35. Estavar (66072)
36. Estoher (66073)
37. Eus (66074)
38. Eyne (66075)
39. Feilluns (66076)
40. Fenouillet (66077)
41. Fillols (66078)
42. Finestret (66079)
43. Fontpédrouse (66080)
44. Fontrabiouse (66081)
45. Font-Romeu-Odeillo-Via (66124)
46. Formiguères (66082)
47. Fosse (66083)
48. Fuilla (66085)
49. Glorianes (66086)
50. Ille-sur-Têt (66088)
51. Joch (66089)
52. Jujols (66090)
53. Lansac (66092)
54. Latour-de-Carol (66095)
55. Latour-de-France (66096)
56. Lesquerde (66097)
57. La Llagonne (66098)
58. Llo (66100)
59. Mantet (66102)
60. Marquixanes (66103)
61. Los Masos (66104)
62. Matemale (66105)
63. Maury (66107)
64. Millas (66108)
65. Molitg-les-Bains (66109)
66. Montalba-le-Château (66111)
67. Mont-Louis (66117)
68. Mosset (66119)
69. Nahuja (66120)
70. Néfiach (66121)
71. Nohèdes (66122)
72. Nyer (66123)
73. Olette (66125)
74. Oreilla (66128)
75. Osséja (66130)
76. Palau-de-Cerdagne (66132)
77. Pézilla-de-Conflent (66139)
78. Planès (66142)
79. Planèzes (66143)
80. Porta (66146)
81. Porté-Puymorens (66147)
82. Prades (66149)
83. Prats-de-Sournia (66151)
84. Prugnanes (66152)
85. Prunet-et-Belpuig (66153)
86. Puyvalador (66154)
87. Py (66155)
88. Rabouillet (66156)
89. Railleu (66157)
90. Rasiguères (66158)
91. Réal (66159)
92. Ria-Sirach (66161)
93. Rigarda (66162)
94. Rodès (66165)
95. Sahorre (66166)
96. Saillagouse (66167)
97. Saint-Arnac (66169)
98. Sainte-Léocadie (66181)
99. Saint-Féliu-d'Amont (66173)
100. Saint-Martin-de-Fenouillet (66184)
101. Saint-Michel-de-Llotes (66185)
102. Saint-Paul-de-Fenouillet (66187)
103. Saint-Pierre-dels-Forcats (66188)
104. Sansa (66191)
105. Sauto (66192)
106. Serdinya (66193)
107. Souanyas (66197)
108. Sournia (66198)
109. Tarerach (66201)
110. Targasonne (66202)
111. Taurinya (66204)
112. Thuès-Entre-Valls (66209)
113. Trévillach (66215)
114. Trilla (66216)
115. Ur (66218)
116. Urbanya (66219)
117. Valcebollère (66220)
118. Valmanya (66221)
119. Vernet-les-Bains (66222)
120. Villefranche-de-Conflent (66223)
121. Vinça (66230)
122. Vira (66232)
123. Le Vivier (66234)

== History ==
The arrondissement of Prades was created in 1800. In January 2017 it gained 23 communes from the arrondissement of Perpignan.

As a result of the reorganisation of the cantons of France which came into effect in 2015, the borders of the cantons are no longer related to the borders of the arrondissements. The cantons of the arrondissement of Prades were, as of January 2015:

1. Mont-Louis
2. Olette
3. Prades
4. Saillagouse
5. Sournia
6. Vinça
