= Canton of Olette =

Coordinates: 42.5561°N 2.2706°E

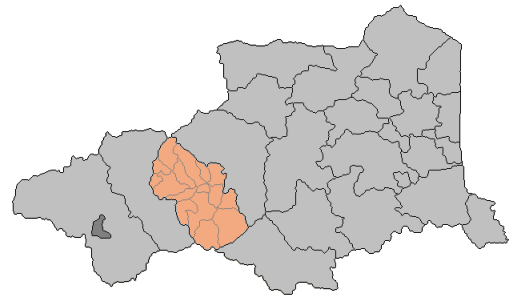
Location of the canton in Pyrénées-Orientales

The Canton of Olette is a French former canton of the Pyrénées-Orientales department, in the Languedoc-Roussillon region. It had 1,647 inhabitants (2012). It was disbanded following the French canton reorganisation which came into effect in March 2015.

The canton comprised the following communes:

- Olette
- Ayguatébia-Talau
- Canaveilles
- Escaro
- Jujols
- Mantet
- Nyer
- Oreilla
- Py
- Railleu
- Sahorre
- Sansa
- Serdinya
- Souanyas
- Thuès-Entre-Valls
