= Mosset =

- Commune
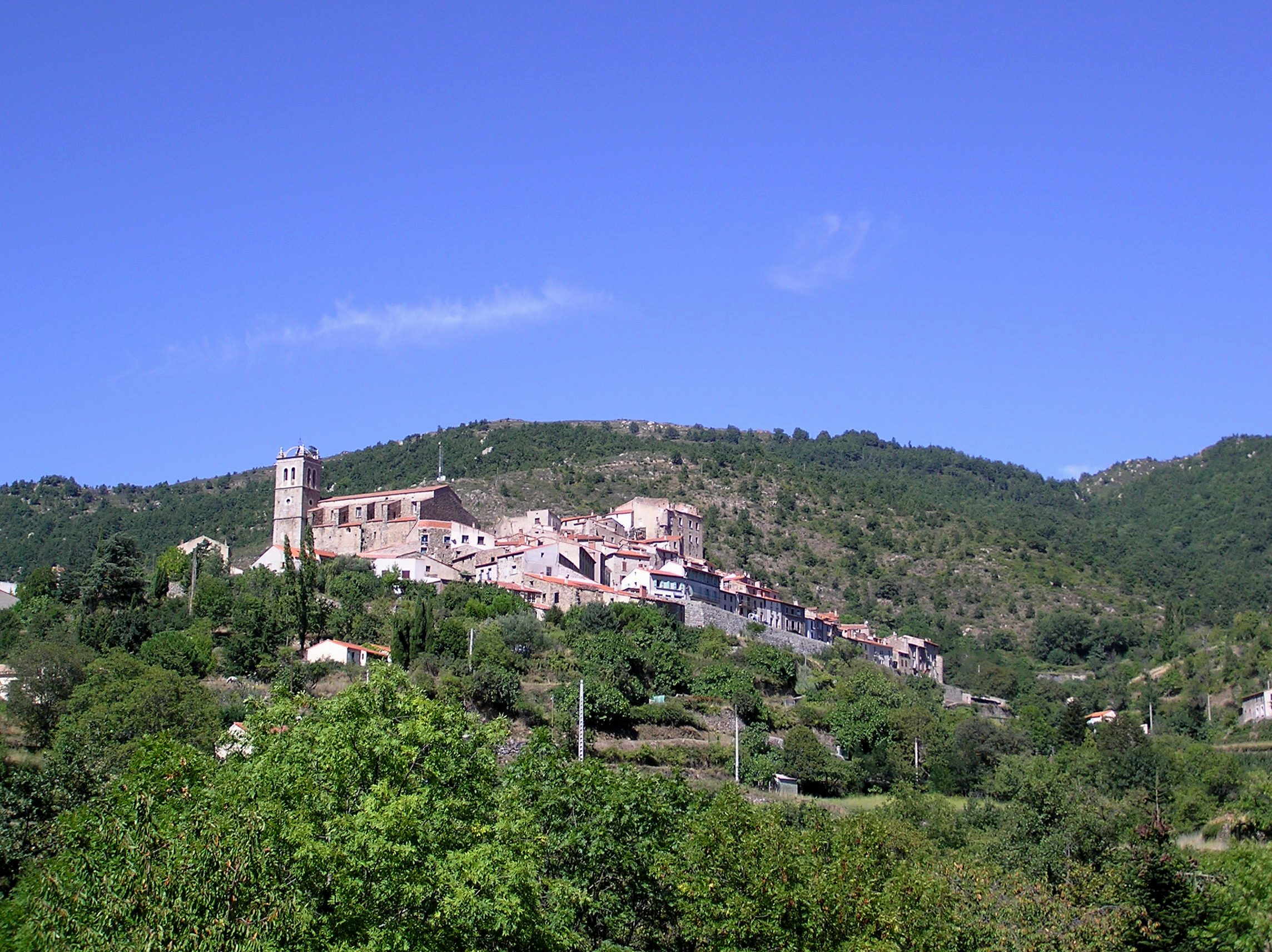
- Mosset seen from the road to Campôme

- Coat of arms
- Location of Mosset
- Location within France Location within Occitanie
- Coordinates: 42°40′09″N 2°20′56″E
- Country: France
- Region: Occitania
- Department: Pyrénées-Orientales
- Arrondissement: Prades
- Canton: Les Pyrénées catalanes

Government
  - Mayor (2020–2026): Christian Triado
- Area^{1}: 71.93 km^{2} (27.77 sq mi)
- Elevation: 710 m (2,330 ft)
- Highest elevation: 2,459 m (8,068 ft)
- Lowest elevation: 558 m (1,831 ft)
- Population (2023): 321
  - Density: 4.46/km^{2} (11.6/sq mi)
- Time zone: UTC+01:00 (CET)
  - Summer (DST): UTC+02:00 (CEST)
- INSEE/Postal code: 66119 /66500
- ^{1} French Land Register data, which excludes lakes, ponds, glaciers > 1 km^{2} (0.386 sq mi or 247 acres) and river estuaries.

Mosset (French pronunciation: [mɔsɛt]) is a commune in the Pyrénées-Orientales department in southern France.

== Geography ==
Mosset is located in the canton of Les Pyrénées catalanes and in the arrondissement of Prades.

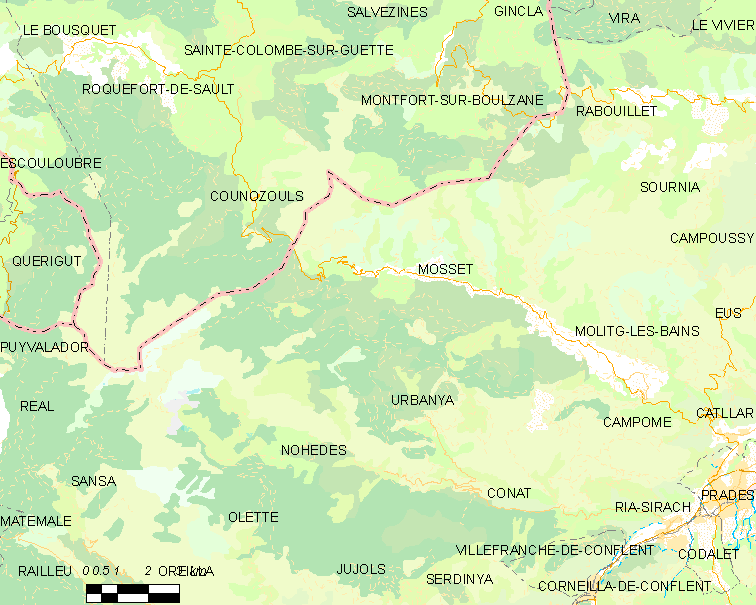
Map of Mosset and its surrounding communes

== Population ==
Historical population
Year	Pop.	±% p.a.
1968	289	—
1975	269	−1.02%
1982	234	−1.97%
1990	266	+1.62%
1999	293	+1.08%
2007	303	+0.42%
2012	290	−0.87%
2017	308	+1.21%
2023	321	+0.69%
Source: INSEE

== See also ==
- Communes of the Pyrénées-Orientales department
