= Réal =

Réal Real
- Commune
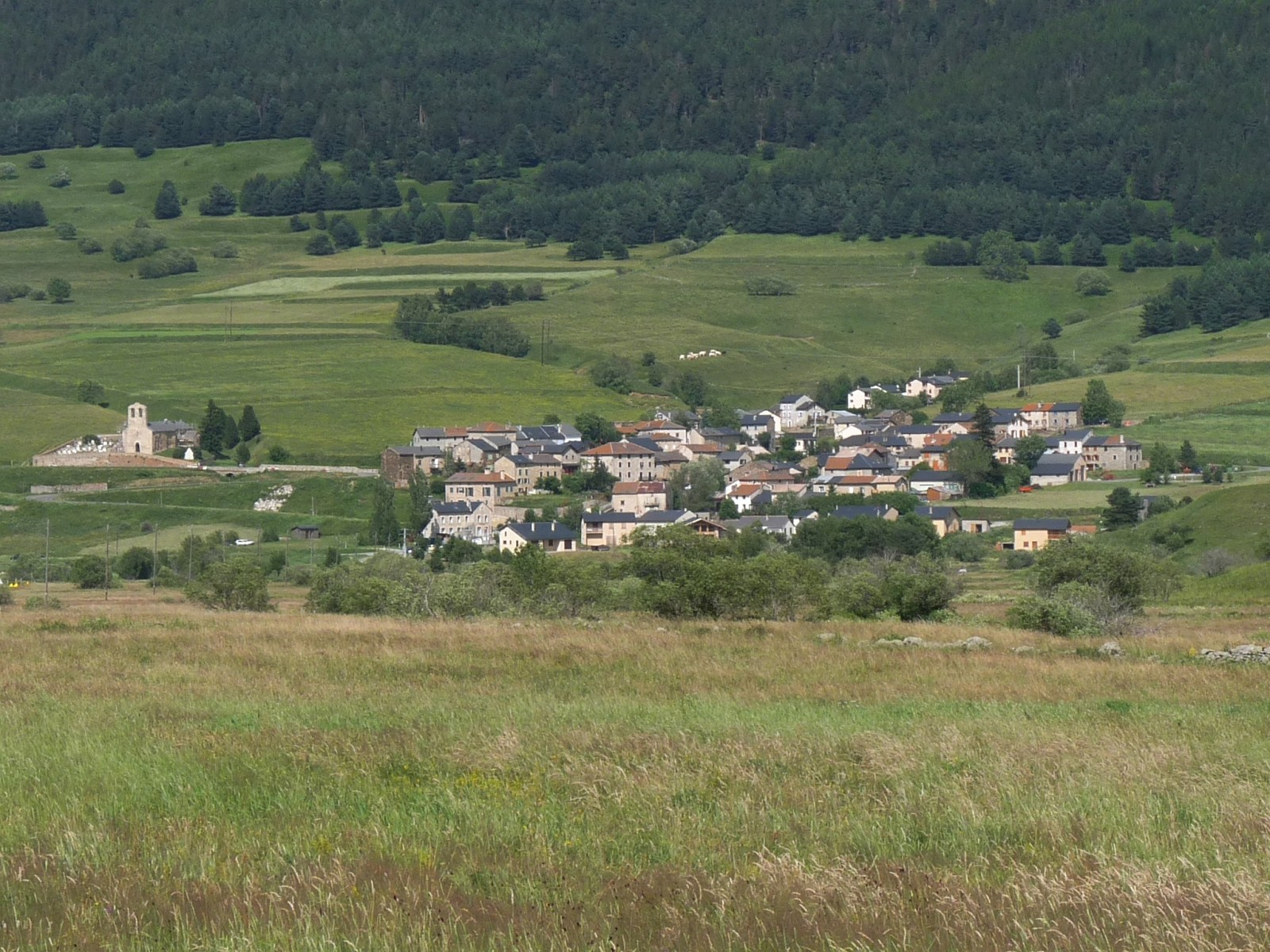
- View of Réal from the Formiguères road
- Location of Réal
- Location within France Location within Occitanie
- Coordinates: 42°37′53″N 2°08′04″E
- Country: France
- Region: Occitania
- Department: Pyrénées-Orientales
- Arrondissement: Prades
- Canton: Les Pyrénées catalanes
- Intercommunality: Pyrénées Catalanes

Government
  - Mayor (2020–2026): Jean-Luc Seguy
- Area^{1}: 10.45 km^{2} (4.03 sq mi)
- Elevation: 1,580 m (5,180 ft)
- Highest elevation: 2,340 m (7,680 ft)
- Lowest elevation: 1,379 m (4,524 ft)
- Population (2023): 81
  - Density: 7.8/km^{2} (20/sq mi)
- Time zone: UTC+01:00 (CET)
  - Summer (DST): UTC+02:00 (CEST)
- INSEE/Postal code: 66159 /66210
- ^{1} French Land Register data, which excludes lakes, ponds, glaciers > 1 km^{2} (0.386 sq mi or 247 acres) and river estuaries.

Réal (French pronunciation: [ʁeal]; Catalan: Real) is a commune in the Pyrénées-Orientales department in southern France.

== Geography ==
Réal is in the canton of Les Pyrénées catalanes and in the arrondissement of Prades.

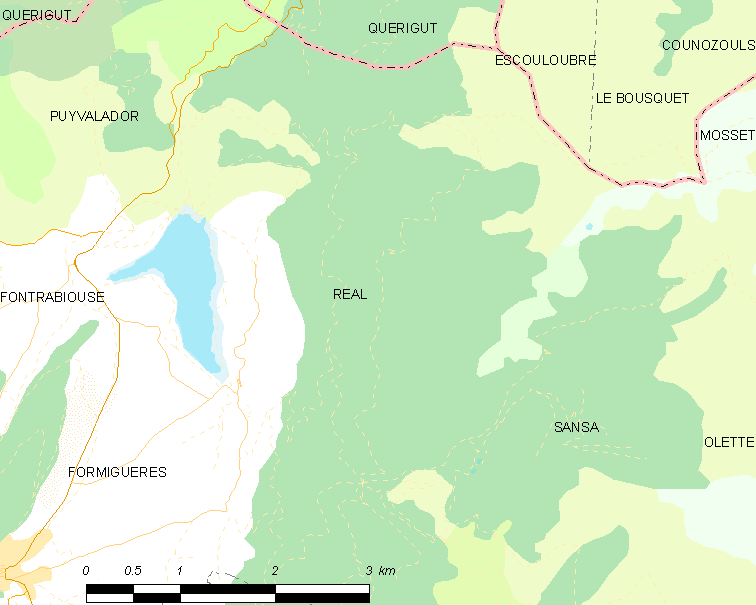
Map of Réal and its surrounding communes

== Population ==
Historical population
Year	Pop.	±% p.a.
1968	71	—
1975	53	−4.09%
1982	44	−2.62%
1990	25	−6.82%
1999	31	+2.42%
2007	42	+3.87%
2012	61	+7.75%
2017	66	+1.59%
2023	81	+3.47%
Source: INSEE

== Sites of interest ==
- The Saint-Romain church, built between the 11th and 17th centuries.
- The Puyvalador lake.

== See also ==
- Communes of the Pyrénées-Orientales department
