= La Llagonne =

La Llagonne La Llaguna
- Commune
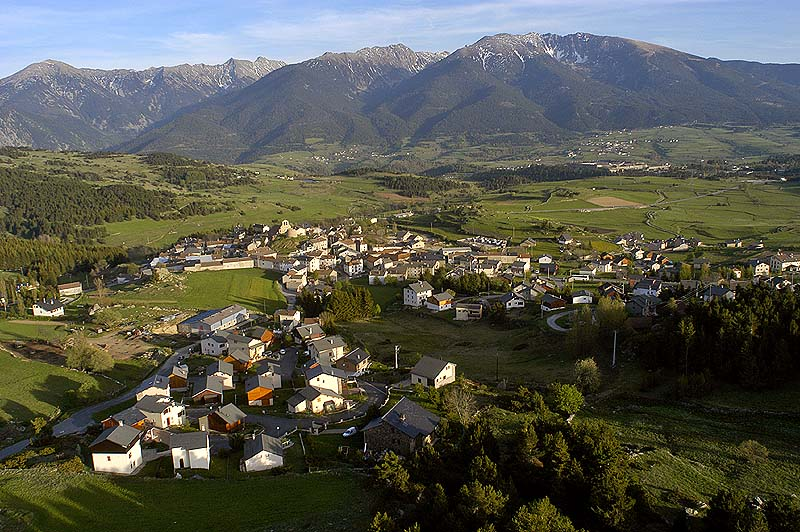
- An aerial view of La Llagonne

- Coat of arms
- Location of La Llagonne
- Location within France Location within Occitanie
- Coordinates: 42°31′38″N 2°07′18″E
- Country: France
- Region: Occitania
- Department: Pyrénées-Orientales
- Arrondissement: Prades
- Canton: Les Pyrénées catalanes
- Intercommunality: Pyrénées Catalanes

Government
  - Mayor (2020–2026): Jean-Pierre Astruch
- Area^{1}: 23.09 km^{2} (8.92 sq mi)
- Elevation: 1,657 m (5,436 ft)
- Highest elevation: 2,196 m (7,205 ft)
- Lowest elevation: 1,546 m (5,072 ft)
- Population (2023): 230
  - Density: 10/km^{2} (26/sq mi)
- Time zone: UTC+01:00 (CET)
  - Summer (DST): UTC+02:00 (CEST)
- INSEE/Postal code: 66098 /66210
- ^{1} French Land Register data, which excludes lakes, ponds, glaciers > 1 km^{2} (0.386 sq mi or 247 acres) and river estuaries.

La Llagonne (French: [la jagɔn]; Catalan: La Llaguna) is a commune in the Pyrénées-Orientales department in southern France.

== Geography ==
La Llagonne is located in the canton of Les Pyrénées catalanes and in the arrondissement of Prades.

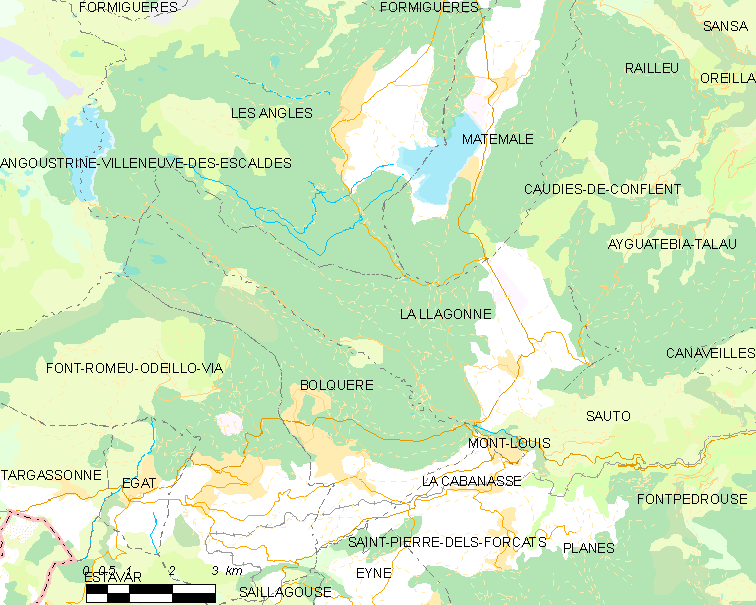
Map of La Llagonne and its surrounding communes

== History ==
First time skiing in the Pyrénées happened on January 29, 1901 at La Llagonne.

== Population ==
Historical population
Year	Pop.	±% p.a.
1968	164	—
1975	138	−2.44%
1982	214	+6.47%
1990	243	+1.60%
1999	263	+0.88%
2007	274	+0.51%
2012	238	−2.78%
2017	219	−1.65%
2023	230	+0.82%
Source: INSEE

== See also ==
- Communes of the Pyrénées-Orientales department
