= Fontrabiouse =

Fontrabiouse Font Rabiosa
- Commune
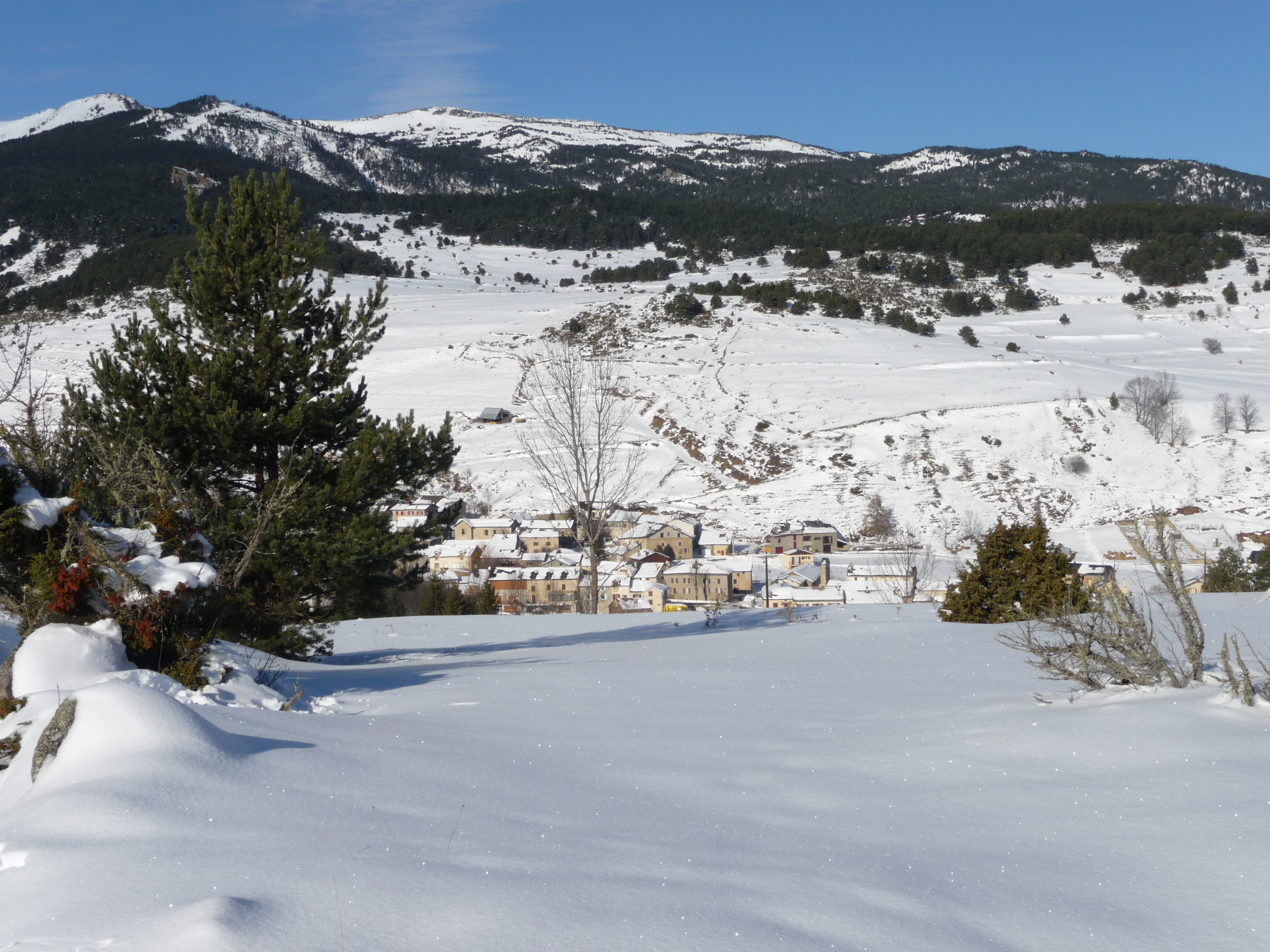
- A general view of Fontrabiouse in the snow
- Location of Fontrabiouse
- Location within France Location within Occitanie
- Coordinates: 42°38′13″N 2°05′48″E
- Country: France
- Region: Occitania
- Department: Pyrénées-Orientales
- Arrondissement: Prades
- Canton: Les Pyrénées catalanes

Government
  - Mayor (2020–2026): Pierre Bataille
- Area^{1}: 15.57 km^{2} (6.01 sq mi)
- Elevation: 1,460 m (4,790 ft)
- Highest elevation: 2,547 m (8,356 ft)
- Lowest elevation: 1,438 m (4,718 ft)
- Population (2023): 144
  - Density: 9.25/km^{2} (24.0/sq mi)
- Time zone: UTC+01:00 (CET)
  - Summer (DST): UTC+02:00 (CEST)
- INSEE/Postal code: 66081 /66210
- ^{1} French Land Register data, which excludes lakes, ponds, glaciers > 1 km^{2} (0.386 sq mi or 247 acres) and river estuaries.

Fontrabiouse (French pronunciation: [fɔ̃ʁabjuz]; Catalan: Font-rabiosa) is a commune in the Pyrénées-Orientales department in southern France.

== Geography ==
Fontrabiouse is located in the canton of Les Pyrénées catalanes and in the arrondissement of Prades.

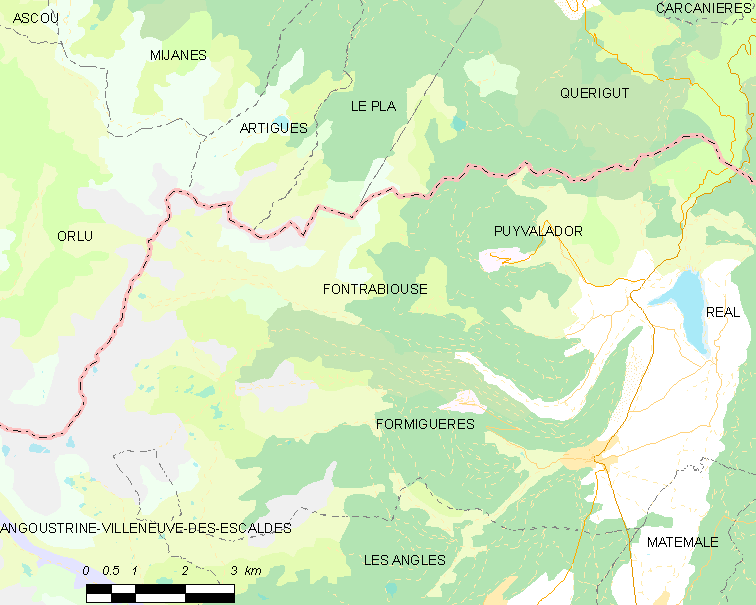
Map of Fontrabiouse and its surrounding communes

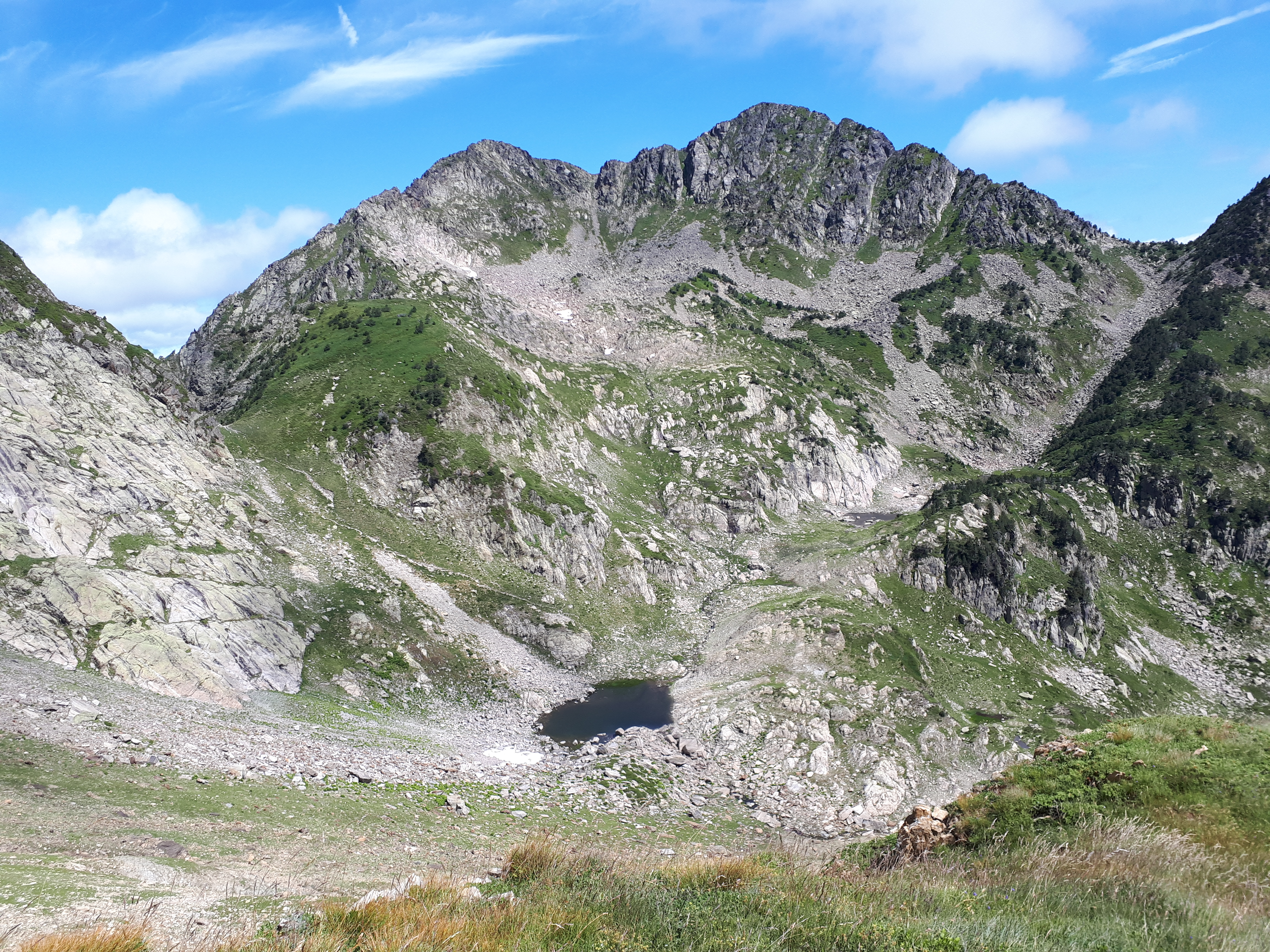
The Pic de Baxouillade, at 2546 metres the highest point in the commune.

== Population ==
Historical population
Year	Pop.	±% p.a.
1968	89	—
1975	96	+1.09%
1982	72	−4.03%
1990	76	+0.68%
1999	91	+2.02%
2007	109	+2.28%
2012	134	+4.22%
2017	127	−1.07%
2023	144	+2.12%
Source: INSEE

== See also ==
- Communes of the Pyrénées-Orientales department
