= Sansa, Pyrénées-Orientales =

Sansa
- Commune
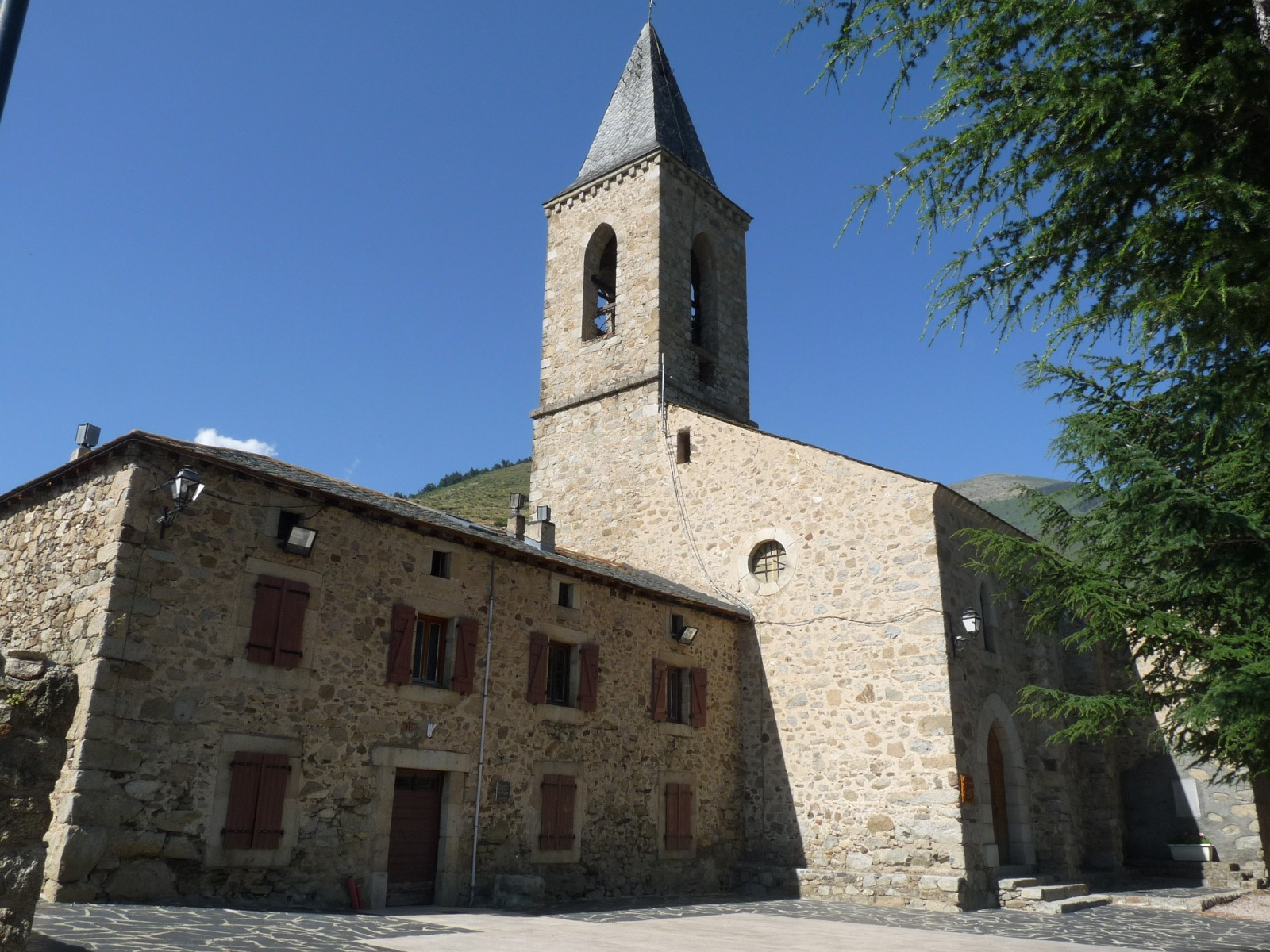
- The town hall and new church, in Sansa
- Location of Sansa
- Location within France Location within Occitanie
- Coordinates: 42°36′11″N 2°10′27″E
- Country: France
- Region: Occitania
- Department: Pyrénées-Orientales
- Arrondissement: Prades
- Canton: Les Pyrénées catalanes

Government
  - Mayor (2020–2026): Antoine Tahoces
- Area^{1}: 22.27 km^{2} (8.60 sq mi)
- Elevation: 1,400 m (4,600 ft)
- Highest elevation: 2,459 m (8,068 ft)
- Lowest elevation: 1,155 m (3,789 ft)
- Population (2023): 31
  - Density: 1.4/km^{2} (3.6/sq mi)
- Time zone: UTC+01:00 (CET)
  - Summer (DST): UTC+02:00 (CEST)
- INSEE/Postal code: 66191 /66360
- ^{1} French Land Register data, which excludes lakes, ponds, glaciers > 1 km^{2} (0.386 sq mi or 247 acres) and river estuaries.

Sansa (French pronunciation: [sɑ̃sa]; Catalan: Censà) is a commune in the Pyrénées-Orientales department in southern France.

== Geography ==
Sansa is located in the canton of Les Pyrénées catalanes and in the arrondissement of Prades.

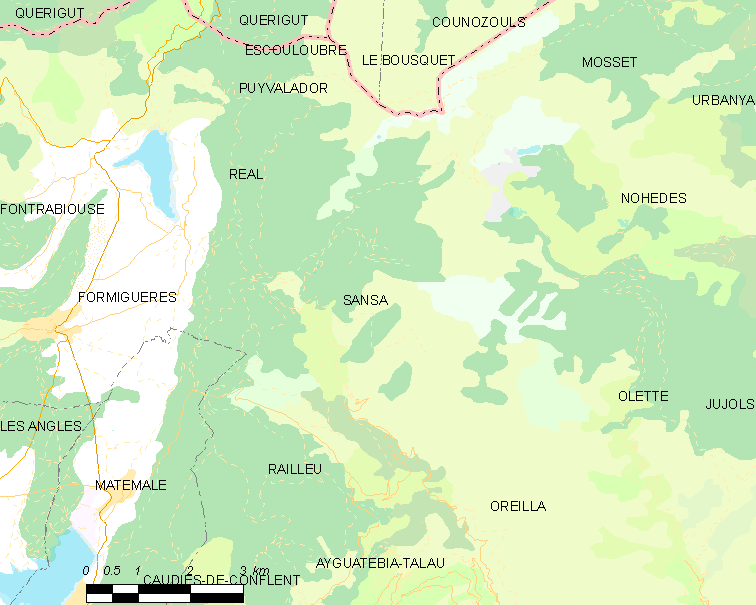
Map of Sansa and its surrounding communes

== Population ==
Historical population
Year	Pop.	±% p.a.
1968	14	—
1975	5	−13.68%
1982	6	+2.64%
1990	7	+1.95%
1999	7	+0.00%
2007	19	+13.29%
2012	29	+8.83%
2017	22	−5.38%
2023	31	+5.88%
Source: INSEE

== See also ==
- Communes of the Pyrénées-Orientales department
