= Les Angles, Pyrénées-Orientales =

Les Angles Els Angles
- Commune
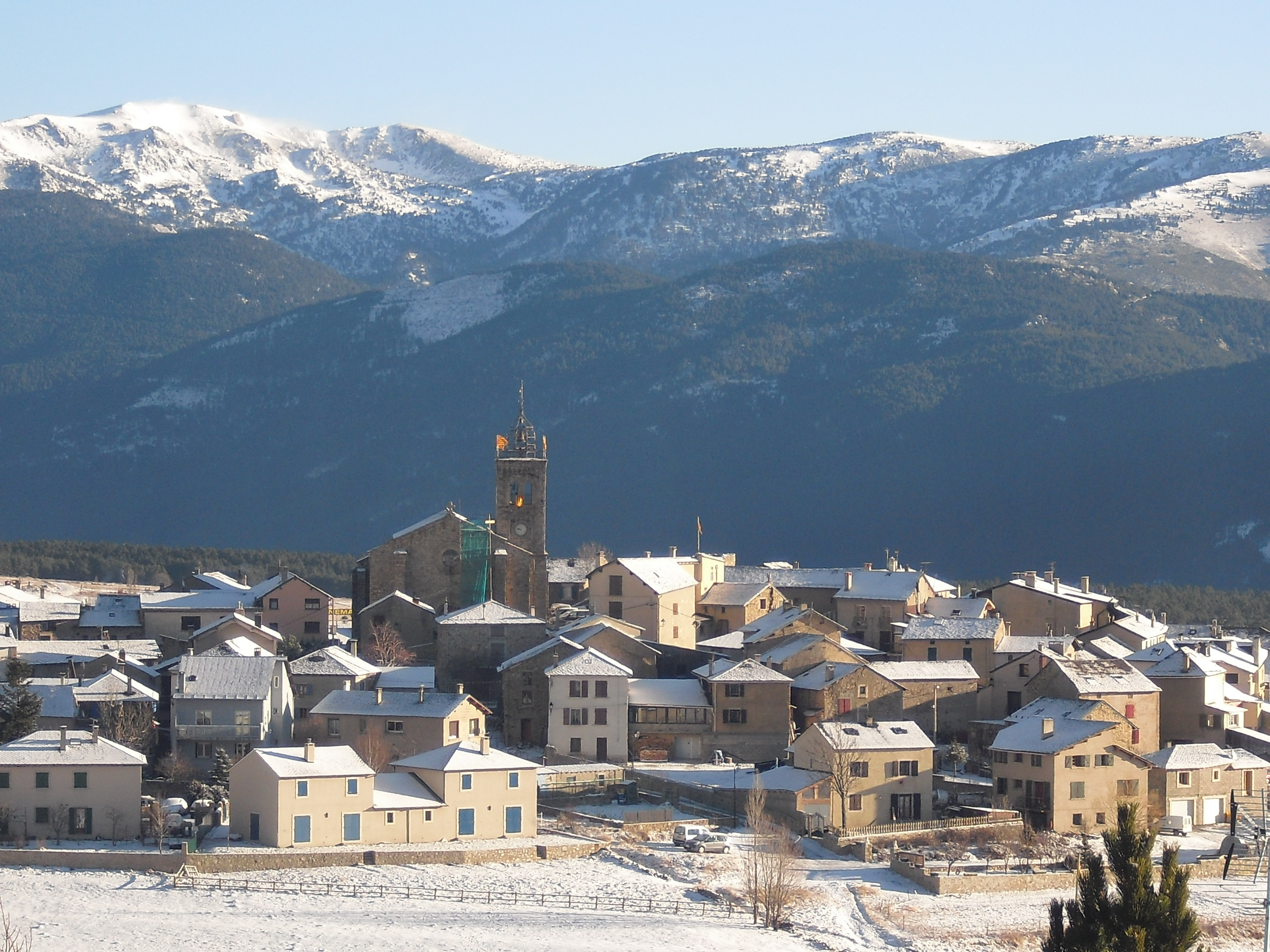
- Les Angles in winter
- Location of Les Angles
- Location within France Location within Occitanie
- Coordinates: 42°34′42″N 2°04′30″E
- Country: France
- Region: Occitania
- Department: Pyrénées-Orientales
- Arrondissement: Prades
- Canton: Les Pyrénées catalanes
- Intercommunality: Pyrénées catalanes

Government
  - Mayor (2020–2026): Michel Poudade
- Area^{1}: 43.20 km^{2} (16.68 sq mi)
- Highest elevation: 2,808 m (9,213 ft)
- Lowest elevation: 1,531 m (5,023 ft)
- Population (2023): 597
  - Density: 13.8/km^{2} (35.8/sq mi)
- Time zone: UTC+01:00 (CET)
  - Summer (DST): UTC+02:00 (CEST)
- INSEE/Postal code: 66004 /66210
- ^{1} French Land Register data, which excludes lakes, ponds, glaciers > 1 km^{2} (0.386 sq mi or 247 acres) and river estuaries.

Les Angles (French pronunciation: [le.z‿ɑ̃ɡl]; Catalan: Els Angles, Catalan pronunciation: [əlz ˈaŋɡləs]) is a commune in the Pyrénées-Orientales department in southern France.

Legend has it that at the beginning of the XIV century, the Black Death wiped out the entire population of the former village of Vallsera. Only two sisters survived, they are believed to have donated all of the land to the commune of Les Angles.

== Geography ==
=== Localisation ===
Les Angles is located in the canton of Les Pyrénées catalanes and in the arrondissement of Prades.

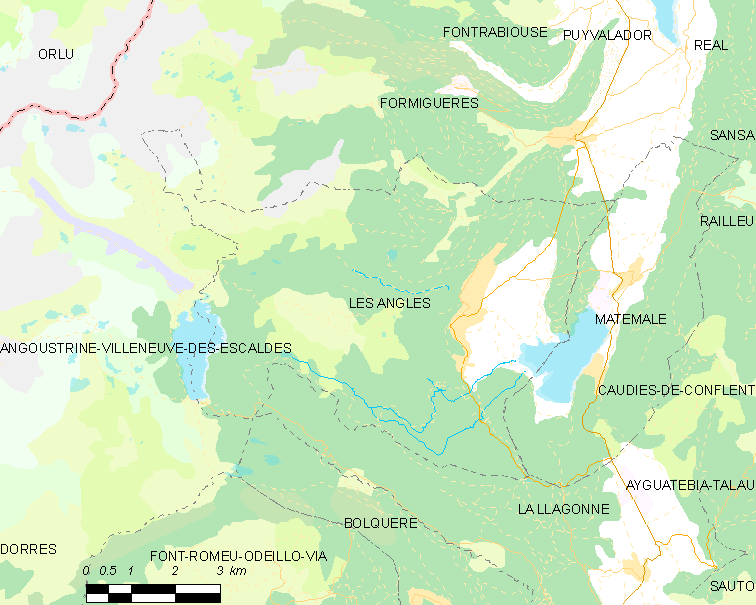
Map of Les Angles and its surrounding communes

== Government and politics ==
=== Mayors ===
Mayor	Term start	Term end
Christian Blanc	2001	2014
Michel Poudade	2014	

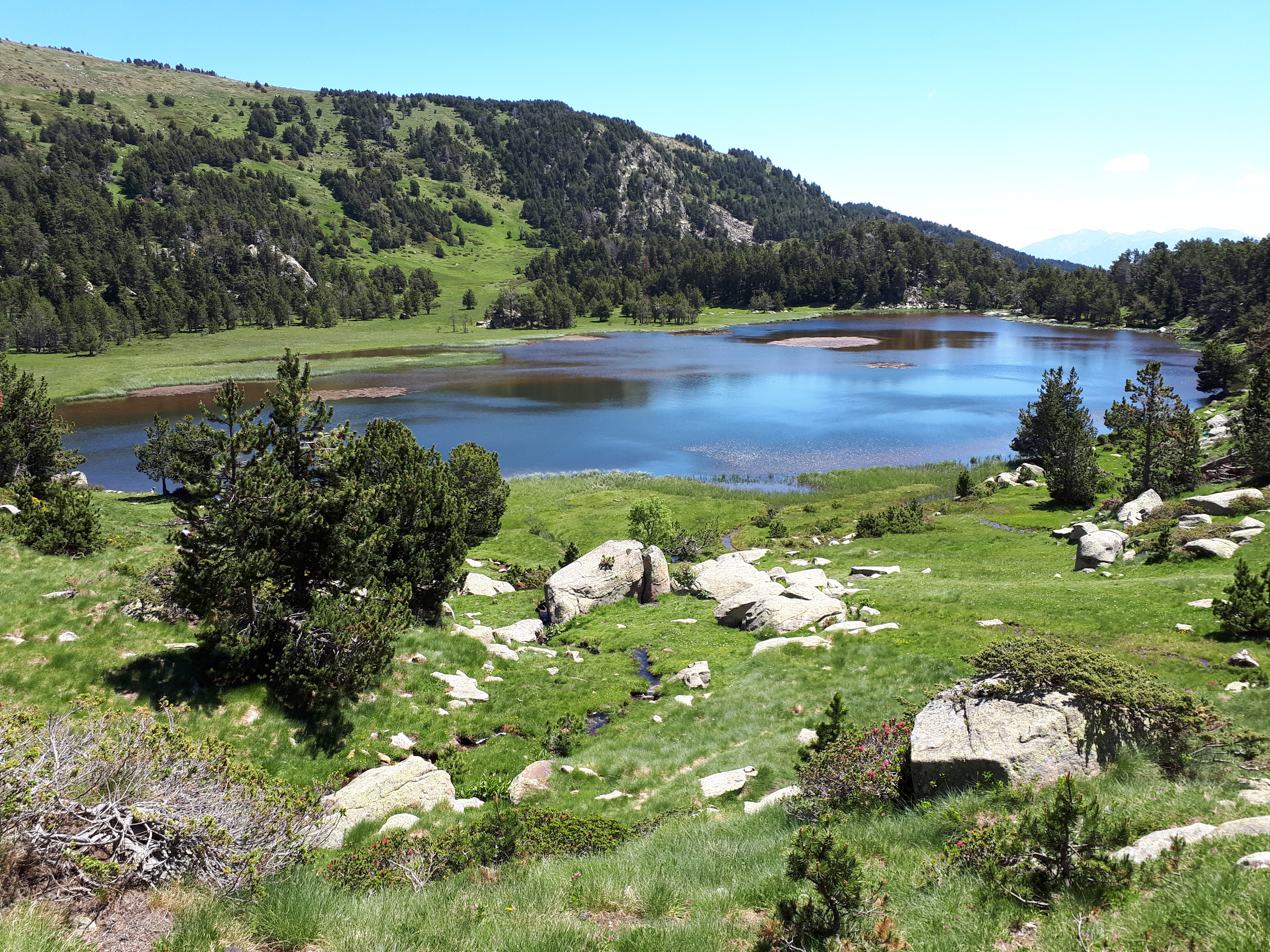
The Lac d'Aude, near the source of the river of the same name, in the commune of Les Angles.

== Population ==
Historical population
Year	Pop.	±% p.a.
1968	277	—
1975	351	+3.44%
1982	475	+4.42%
1990	528	+1.33%
1999	590	+1.24%
2007	565	−0.54%
2012	541	−0.86%
2017	547	+0.22%
2023	597	+1.47%
Source: INSEE

== See also ==
- Communes of the Pyrénées-Orientales department
