= Railleu =

Railleu Ralleu
- Commune
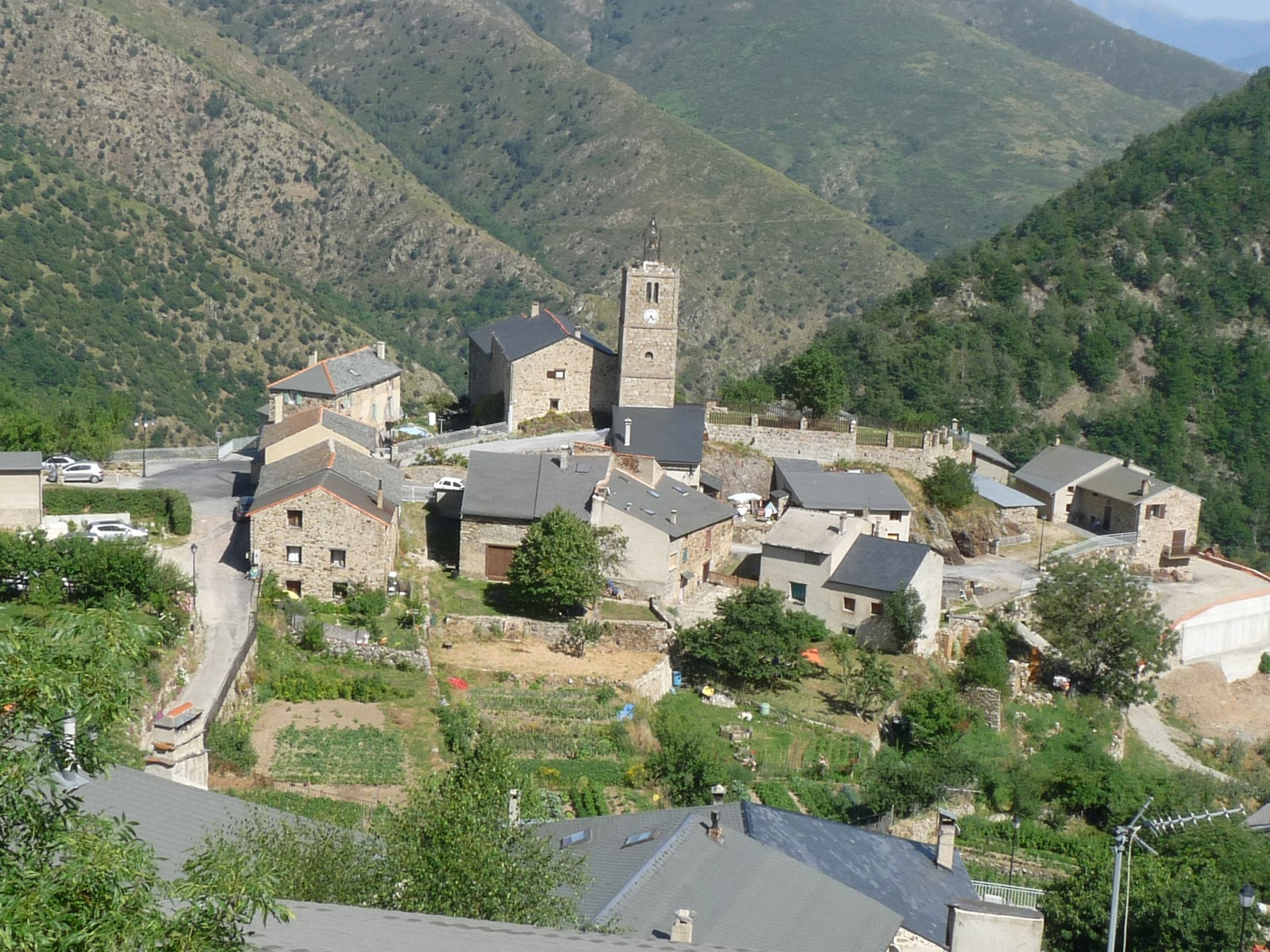
- A view of Railleu and the Garrotxes

- Coat of arms
- Location of Railleu
- Location within France Location within Occitanie
- Coordinates: 42°35′13″N 2°10′59″E
- Country: France
- Region: Occitania
- Department: Pyrénées-Orientales
- Arrondissement: Prades
- Canton: Les Pyrénées catalanes

Government
  - Mayor (2020–2026): Patrice Camps
- Area^{1}: 9.97 km^{2} (3.85 sq mi)
- Elevation: 1,412 m (4,633 ft)
- Highest elevation: 2,080 m (6,820 ft)
- Lowest elevation: 1,150 m (3,770 ft)
- Population (2023): 23
  - Density: 2.3/km^{2} (6.0/sq mi)
- Time zone: UTC+01:00 (CET)
  - Summer (DST): UTC+02:00 (CEST)
- INSEE/Postal code: 66157 /66360
- ^{1} French Land Register data, which excludes lakes, ponds, glaciers > 1 km^{2} (0.386 sq mi or 247 acres) and river estuaries.

Railleu (French pronunciation: [ʁajø]; Catalan: Ralleu) is a commune in the Pyrénées-Orientales department in southern France.

== Geography ==
Railleu is in the canton of Les Pyrénées catalanes and in the arrondissement of Prades.

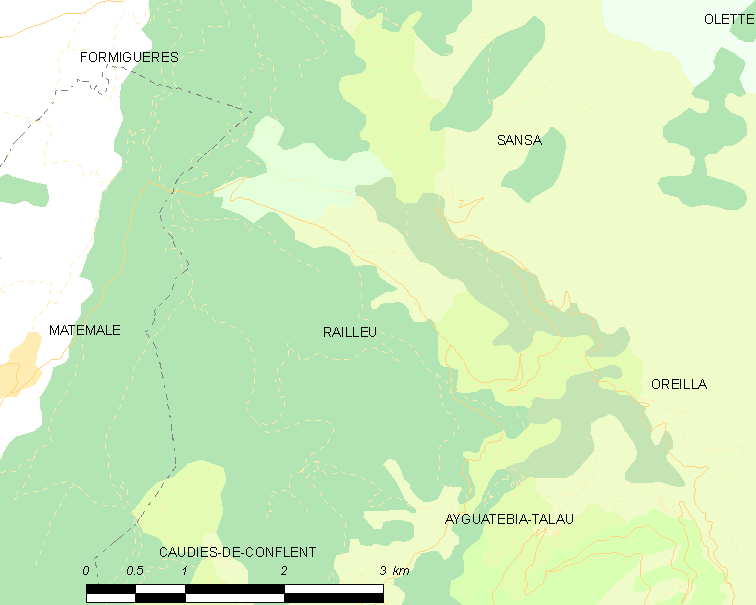
Map of Railleu and its surrounding communes

== Population ==
Historical population
Year	Pop.	±% p.a.
1968	25	—
1975	11	−11.07%
1982	10	−1.35%
1990	11	+1.20%
1999	16	+4.25%
2007	11	−4.58%
2012	25	+17.84%
2017	32	+5.06%
2023	23	−5.36%
Source: INSEE

== See also ==
- Communes of the Pyrénées-Orientales department
