= Dorres =

- Commune
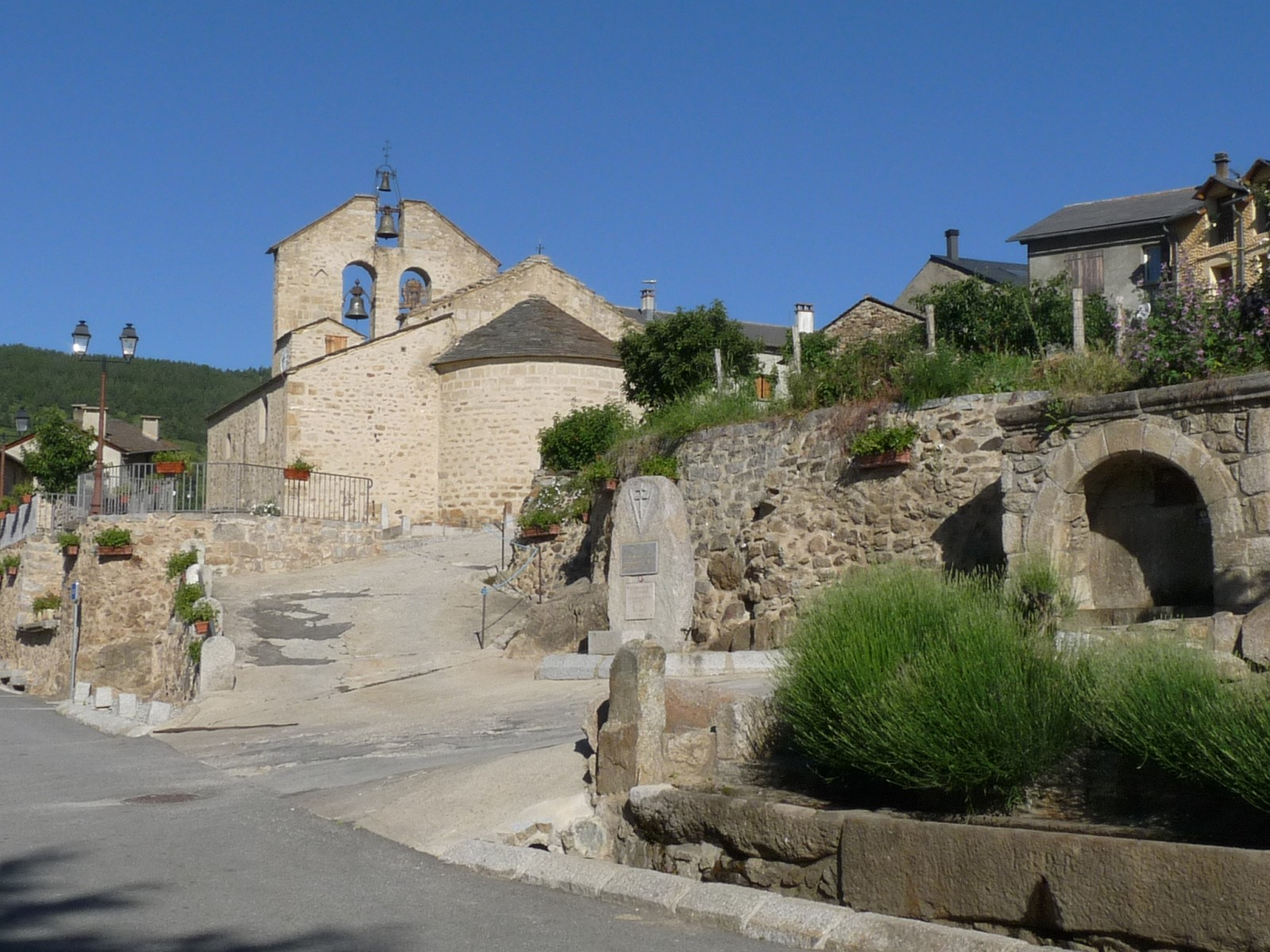
- The centre of the village in 2013

- Coat of arms
- Location of Dorres
- Location within France Location within Occitanie
- Coordinates: 42°29′08″N 1°56′23″E
- Country: France
- Region: Occitania
- Department: Pyrénées-Orientales
- Arrondissement: Prades
- Canton: Les Pyrénées catalanes
- Intercommunality: Pyrénées Cerdagne

Government
  - Mayor (2020–2026): Alain Colomer
- Area^{1}: 24.77 km^{2} (9.56 sq mi)
- Elevation: 1,450 m (4,760 ft)
- Highest elevation: 2,827 m (9,275 ft)
- Lowest elevation: 1,332 m (4,370 ft)
- Population (2023): 182
  - Density: 7.35/km^{2} (19.0/sq mi)
- Time zone: UTC+01:00 (CET)
  - Summer (DST): UTC+02:00 (CEST)
- INSEE/Postal code: 66062 /66760
- ^{1} French Land Register data, which excludes lakes, ponds, glaciers > 1 km^{2} (0.386 sq mi or 247 acres) and river estuaries.

Dorres (French pronunciation: [dɔʁ]; Catalan: Dorres) is a commune in the Pyrénées-Orientales department in southern France.

== Geography ==
=== Localisation ===
Dorres is located in the canton of Les Pyrénées catalanes and in the arrondissement of Prades.

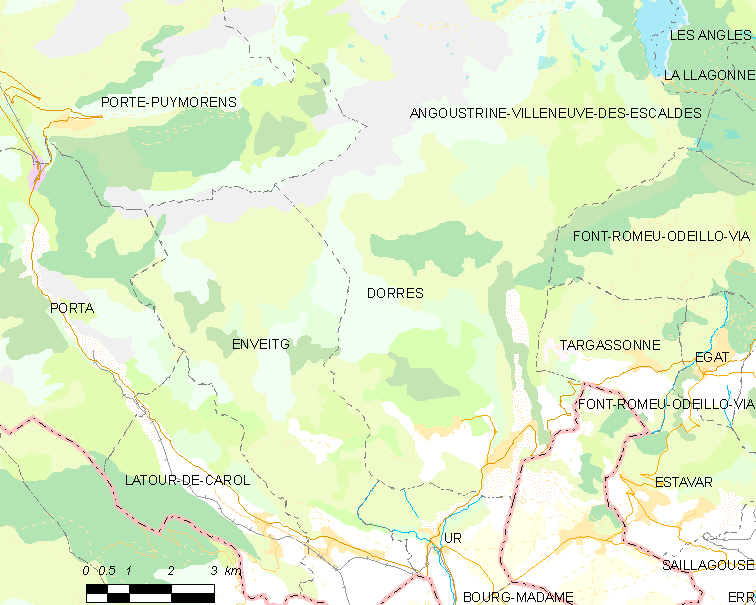
Map of Dorres and its surrounding communes

== History ==
Various tools and evidence of occupation found in the surroundings prove that the territory of Dorres was already occupied in prehistoric times.

At the end of the 9th century, Dorres was a property of Sunifred (who died ca. 890), a son of Sunifred, count of Cerdanya. Having become the abbot of the Abbey of Arles-sur-Tech, Sunifred then gave Dorres to his nephew and godson Radulf, himself the son of Wilfred the Hairy and future bishop of Urgell. Later, in the 12th century, is found the name of Guillem de Edorres, supposed to be the local lord. From the 14th century, Dorres becomes part of the crown estate.

Being mainly mountain territory, Dorres was never much populated and reached its peak of population in 1851, with about 366 people, and it was yet until the end of the 19th century that locals were attacked by wolves.

== Population ==
Historical population
Year	Pop.	±% p.a.
1968	171	—
1975	154	−1.48%
1982	156	+0.18%
1990	192	+2.63%
1999	219	+1.47%
2007	179	−2.49%
2012	162	−1.98%
2017	169	+0.85%
2023	182	+1.24%
Source: INSEE

== Sites of interest ==
- Notre-Dame-de-Belloc chapel.
- Saint John church.
- Magette chapel.
- Hot springs of sulfur water.

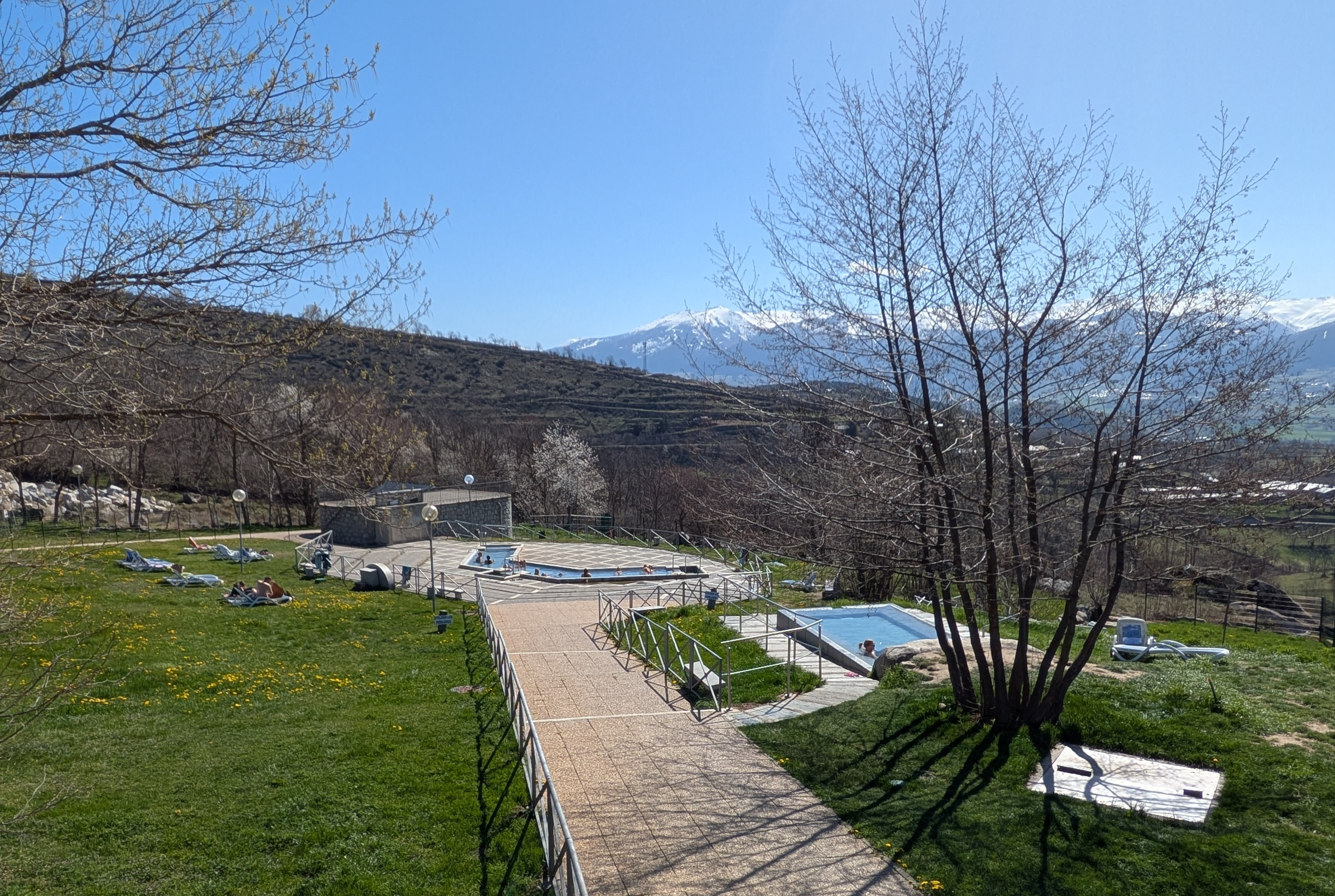
Hot baths at Dorres. Beyond are mountains of Cerdagne and Conflent.

== See also ==
- Communes of the Pyrénées-Orientales department
