= Oreilla =

- Commune
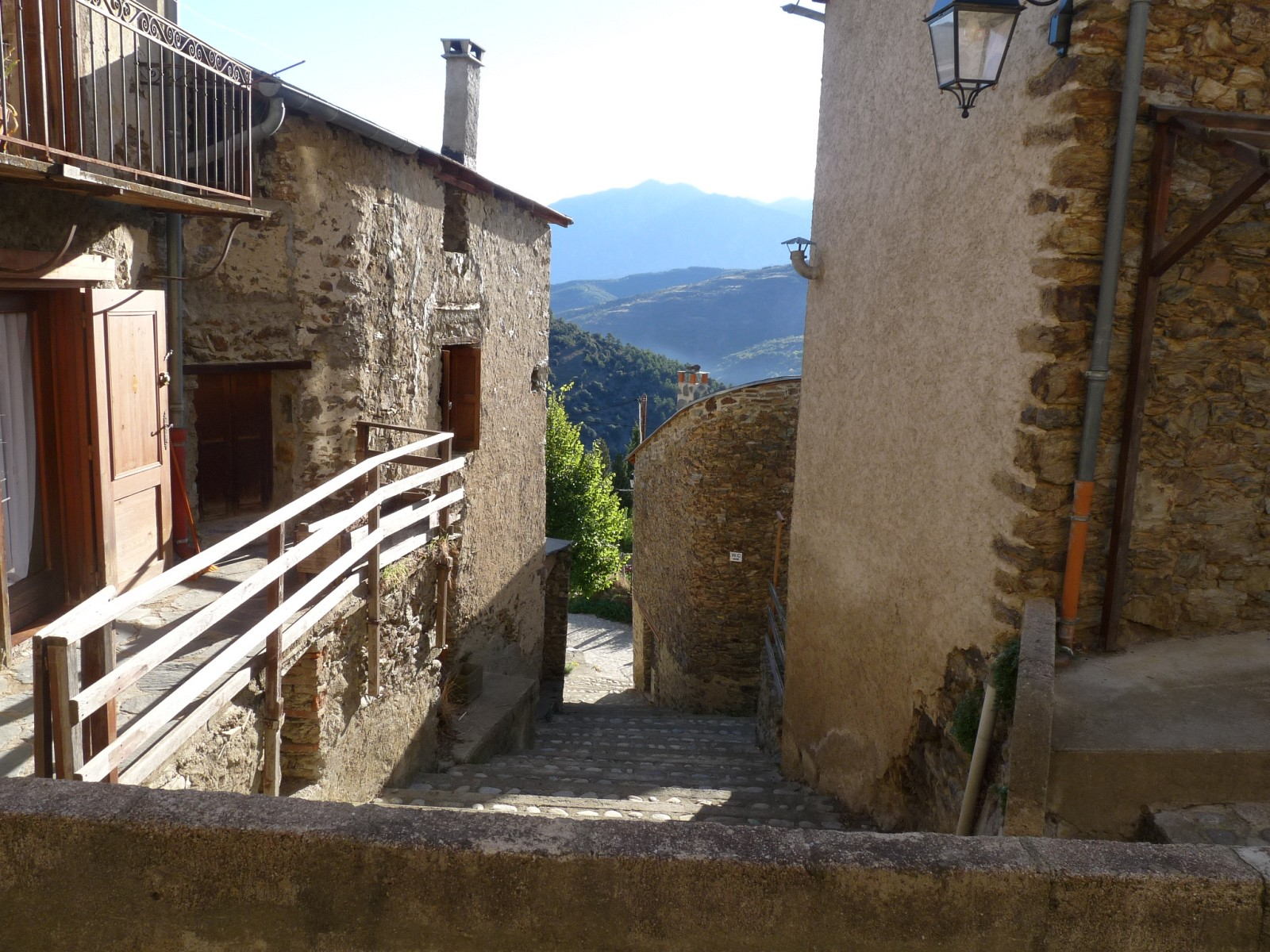
- The upper village of Oreilla

- Coat of arms
- Location of Oreilla
- Location within France Location within Occitanie
- Coordinates: 42°33′37″N 2°15′16″E
- Country: France
- Region: Occitania
- Department: Pyrénées-Orientales
- Arrondissement: Prades
- Canton: Les Pyrénées catalanes

Government
  - Mayor (2020–2026): Éric Rodriguez
- Area^{1}: 16.03 km^{2} (6.19 sq mi)
- Elevation: 873 m (2,864 ft)
- Highest elevation: 2,089 m (6,854 ft)
- Lowest elevation: 620 m (2,030 ft)
- Population (2023): 28
  - Density: 1.7/km^{2} (4.5/sq mi)
- Time zone: UTC+01:00 (CET)
  - Summer (DST): UTC+02:00 (CEST)
- INSEE/Postal code: 66128 /66360
- ^{1} French Land Register data, which excludes lakes, ponds, glaciers > 1 km^{2} (0.386 sq mi or 247 acres) and river estuaries.

Oreilla (French pronunciation: [ɔʁɛja]; Catalan: Orellà) is a commune in the Pyrénées-Orientales department in southern France.

== Geography ==
Oreilla is located in the canton of Les Pyrénées catalanes and in the arrondissement of Prades.

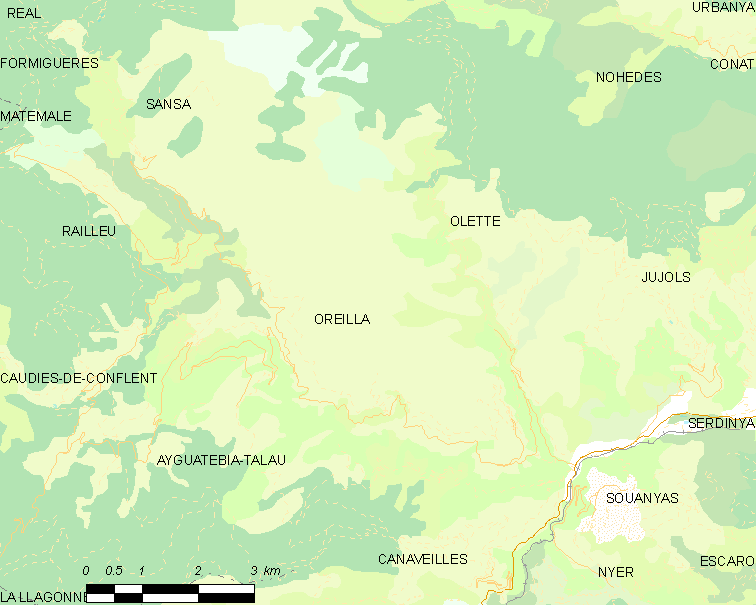
Map of Oreilla and its surrounding communes

== History ==
Oreilla is the commune of France which suffered the highest ratio of losses during the First World War: 20 men were drafted, 18 were killed in action, which represented 13% of the whole population of the village (the national average was 3.53%)

== Population ==
Historical population
| Year | Pop. | ±% p.a. |
|---|---|---|
| 1968 | 39 | — |
| 1975 | 30 | −3.68% |
| 1982 | 25 | −2.57% |
| 1990 | 27 | +0.97% |
| 1999 | 15 | −6.32% |
| 2007 | 15 | +0.00% |
| 2012 | 13 | −2.82% |
| 2017 | 23 | +12.09% |
| 2023 | 28 | +3.33% |
Source: INSEE

== See also ==
- Communes of the Pyrénées-Orientales department
