= Campôme =

Campôme Campome
- Commune
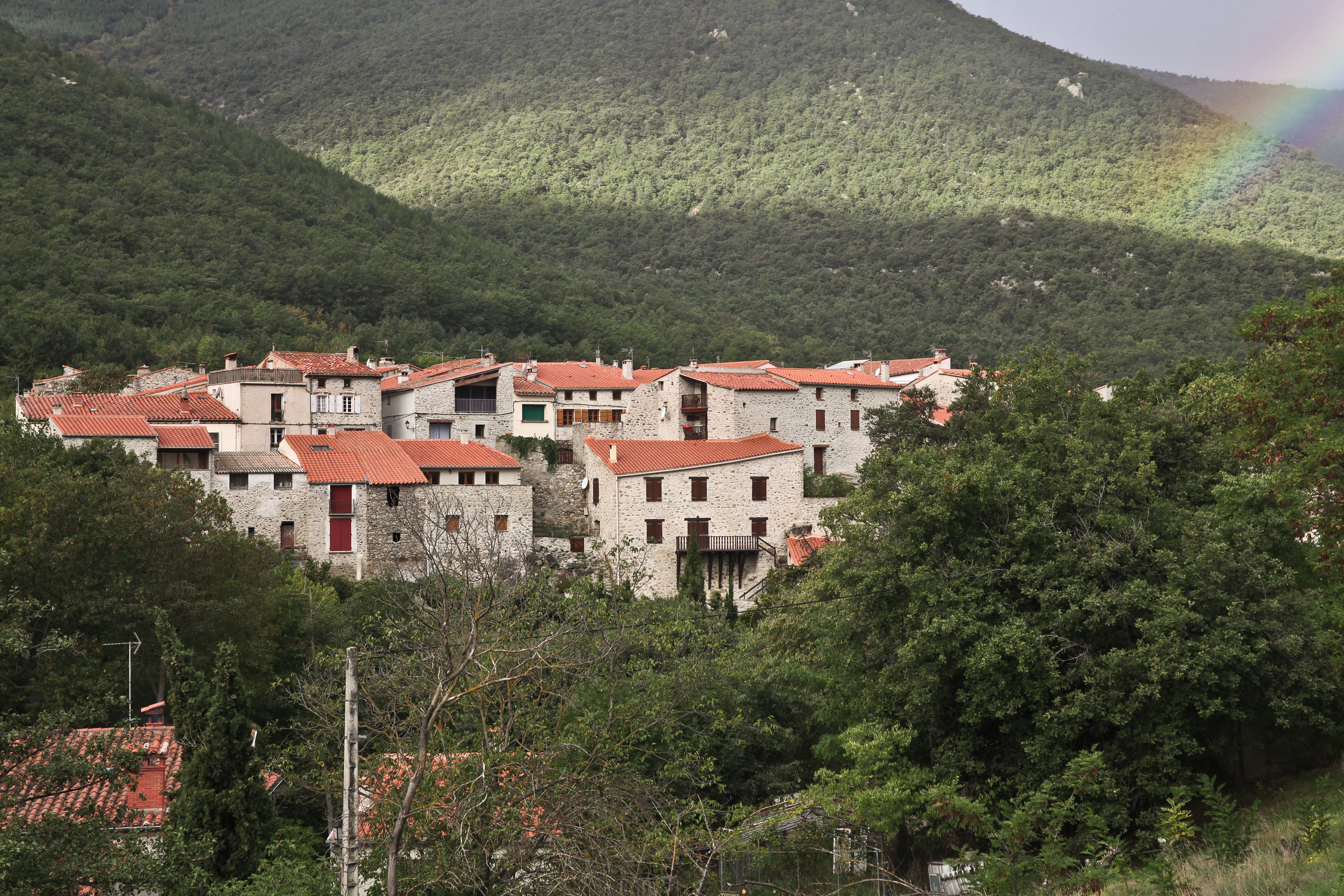
- A general view of Campôme
- Location of Campôme
- Location within France Location within Occitanie
- Coordinates: 42°39′06″N 2°22′37″E
- Country: France
- Region: Occitania
- Department: Pyrénées-Orientales
- Arrondissement: Prades
- Canton: Les Pyrénées catalanes
- Intercommunality: Conflent-Canigó

Government
  - Mayor (2020–2026): Jean-Louis Bosc
- Area^{1}: 5.26 km^{2} (2.03 sq mi)
- Elevation: 550 m (1,800 ft)
- Highest elevation: 1,120 m (3,670 ft)
- Lowest elevation: 357 m (1,171 ft)
- Population (2023): 124
  - Density: 23.6/km^{2} (61.1/sq mi)
- Time zone: UTC+01:00 (CET)
  - Summer (DST): UTC+02:00 (CEST)
- INSEE/Postal code: 66034 /66500
- ^{1} French Land Register data, which excludes lakes, ponds, glaciers > 1 km^{2} (0.386 sq mi or 247 acres) and river estuaries.

Campôme (French pronunciation: [kɑ̃pom]; Catalan: Campome) is a commune in the Pyrénées-Orientales department in southern France.

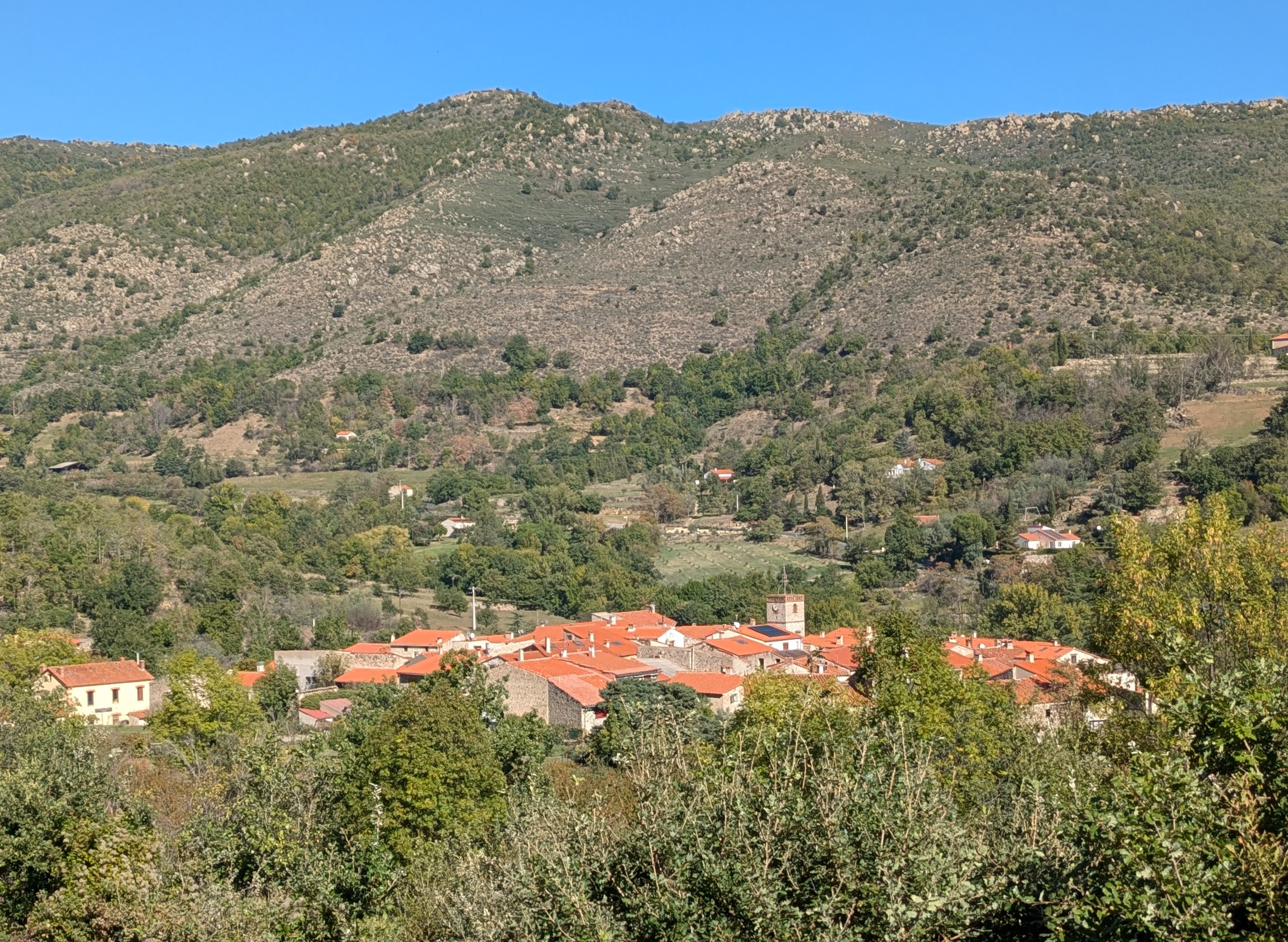
The village is located in a granite region, at the bottom of the Castellane valley, nestling in a green setting.

== Geography ==
=== Localisation ===
Campôme is located in the canton of Les Pyrénées catalanes and in the arrondissement of Prades.

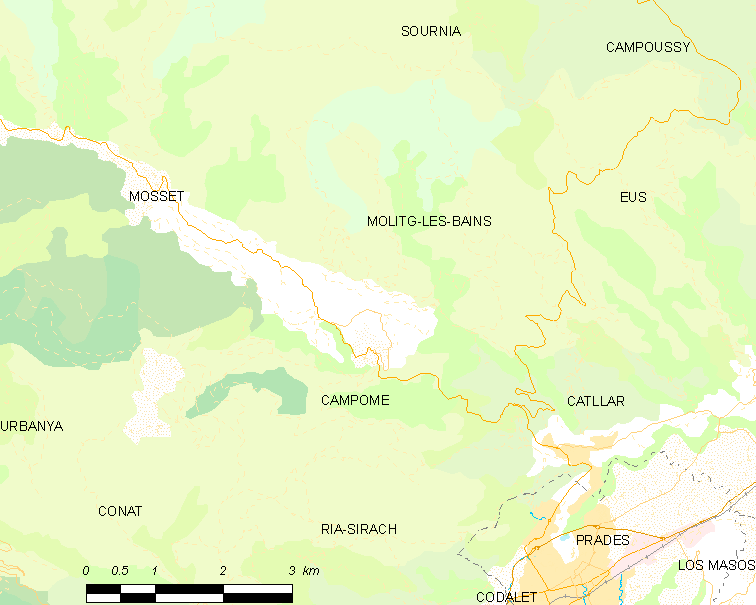
Map of Campôme and its surrounding communes

== Population ==
Historical population
Year	Pop.	±% p.a.
1968	104	—
1975	102	−0.28%
1982	104	+0.28%
1990	121	+1.91%
1999	106	−1.46%
2007	106	+0.00%
2012	113	+1.29%
2017	111	−0.36%
2023	124	+1.86%
Source: INSEE

== See also ==
- Communes of the Pyrénées-Orientales department
