= La Cabanasse =

La Cabanasse La Cabanassa
- Commune
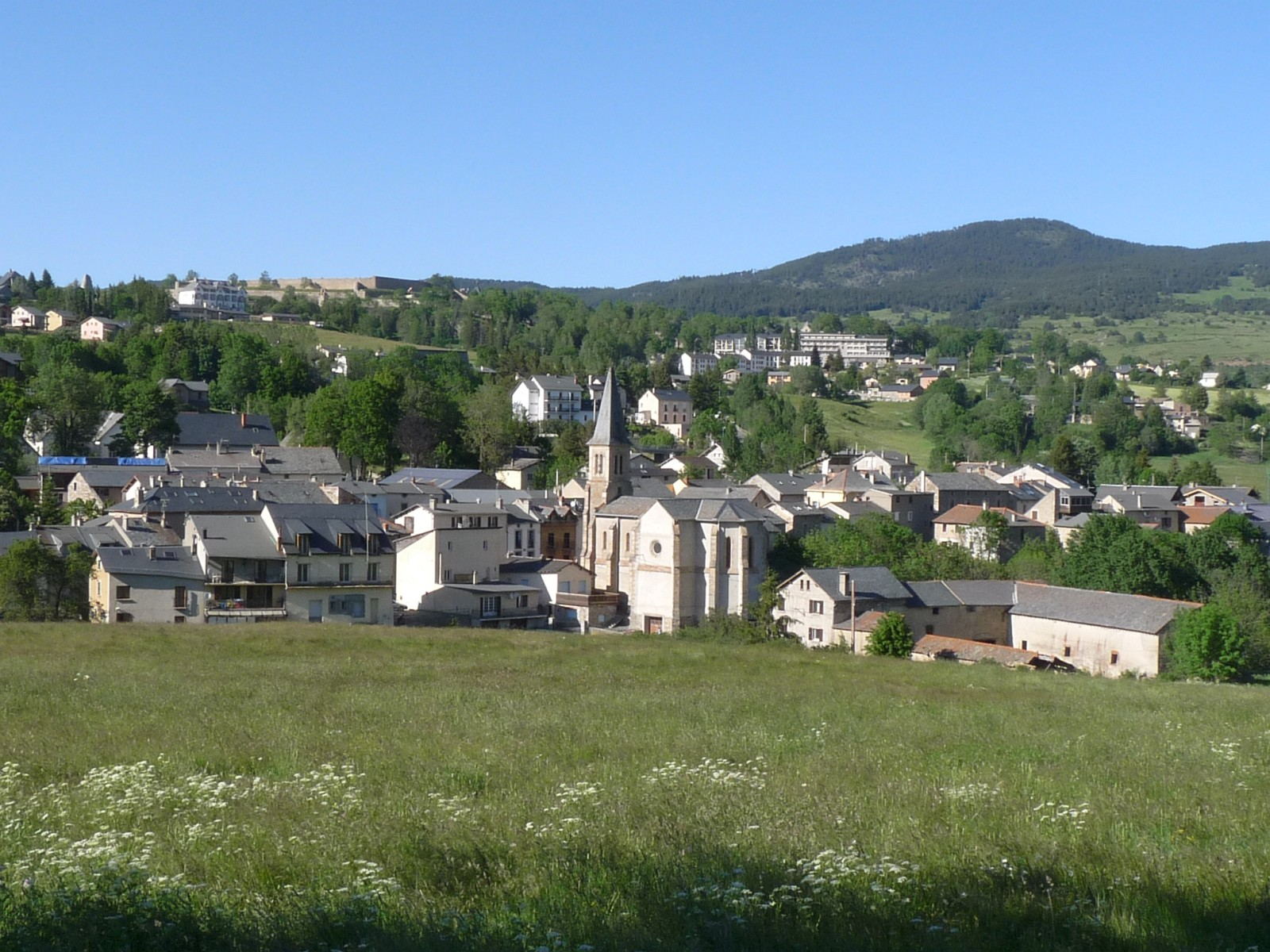
- A general view of La Cabanasse

- Coat of arms
- Location of La Cabanasse
- Location within France Location within Occitanie
- Coordinates: 42°30′08″N 2°06′56″E
- Country: France
- Region: Occitania
- Department: Pyrénées-Orientales
- Arrondissement: Prades
- Canton: Les Pyrénées catalanes

Government
  - Mayor (2025–2026): Serge Polato
- Area^{1}: 3.26 km^{2} (1.26 sq mi)
- Elevation: 1,511 m (4,957 ft)
- Highest elevation: 1,623 m (5,325 ft)
- Lowest elevation: 1,360 m (4,460 ft)
- Population (2023): 713
  - Density: 219/km^{2} (566/sq mi)
- Time zone: UTC+01:00 (CET)
  - Summer (DST): UTC+02:00 (CEST)
- INSEE/Postal code: 66027 /66210
- ^{1} French Land Register data, which excludes lakes, ponds, glaciers > 1 km^{2} (0.386 sq mi or 247 acres) and river estuaries.

La Cabanasse (French pronunciation: [la kabanas]; Catalan: La Cabanassa) is a commune in the Pyrénées-Orientales department in southern France.

== Geography ==
=== Localisation ===
La Cabanasse is located in the canton of Les Pyrénées catalanes and in the arrondissement of Prades.

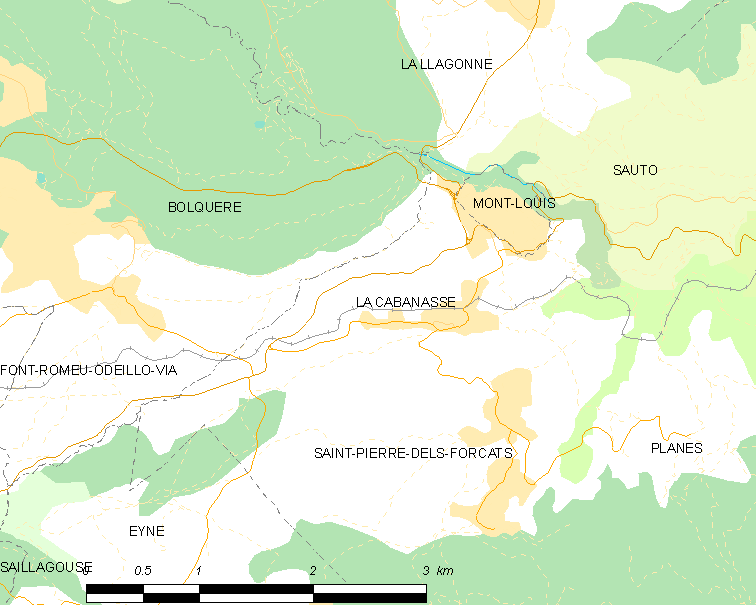
Map of La Cabanasse and its surrounding communes

== Government and politics ==
=== Mayors ===
Mayor	Term start	Term end
Jacqueline Armengou	2001	2014
François Delcasso	2014	

== Population ==
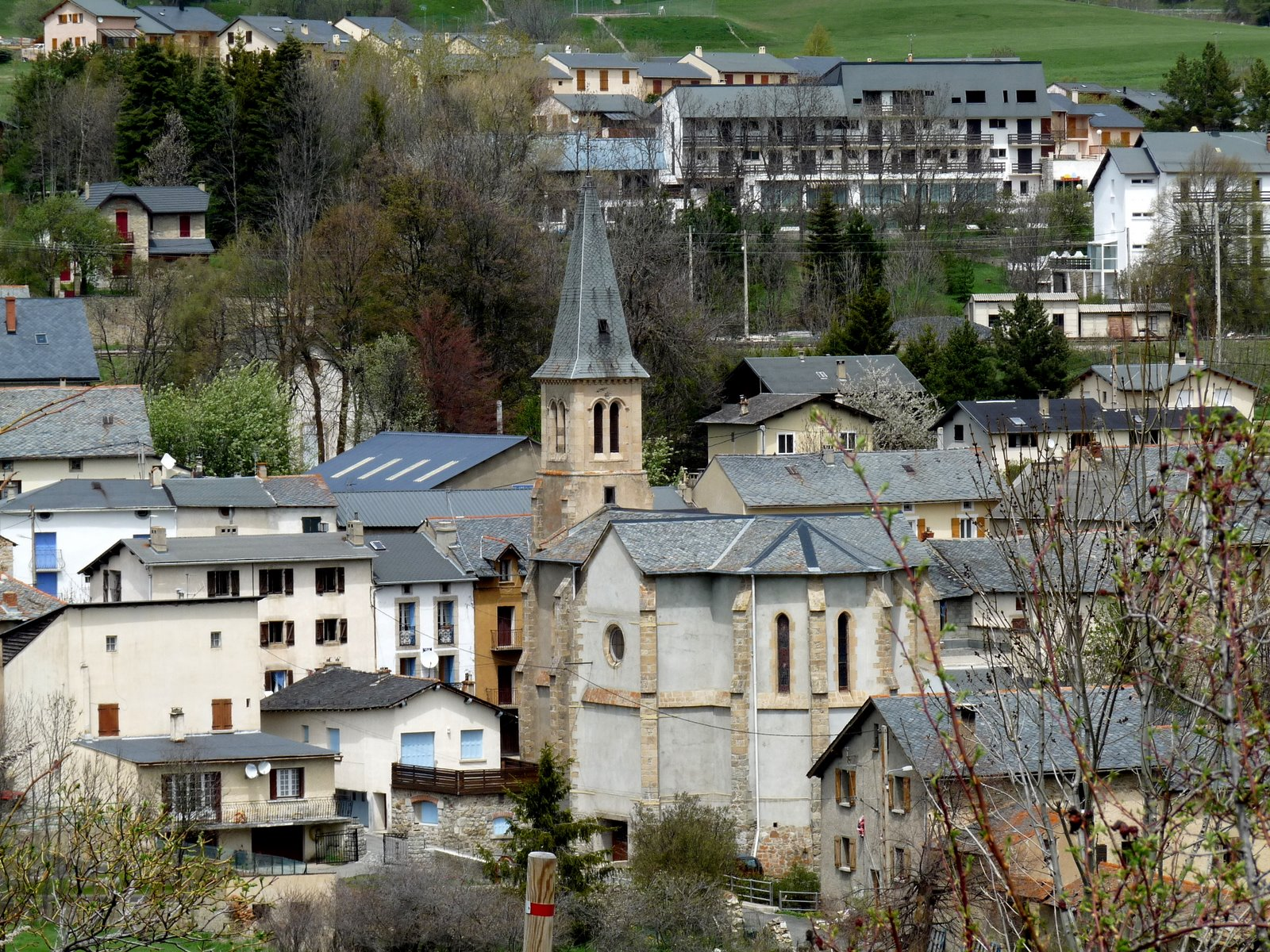
La Cabanasse

Historical population
Year	Pop.	±% p.a.
1968	452	—
1975	589	+3.85%
1982	526	−1.60%
1990	577	+1.16%
1999	622	+0.84%
2007	740	+2.20%
2012	698	−1.16%
2017	669	−0.85%
2023	713	+1.07%
Source: INSEE

== See also ==
- Communes of the Pyrénées-Orientales department
