= Porté-Puymorens =

Porté-Puymorens Portè i Pimorent
- Commune
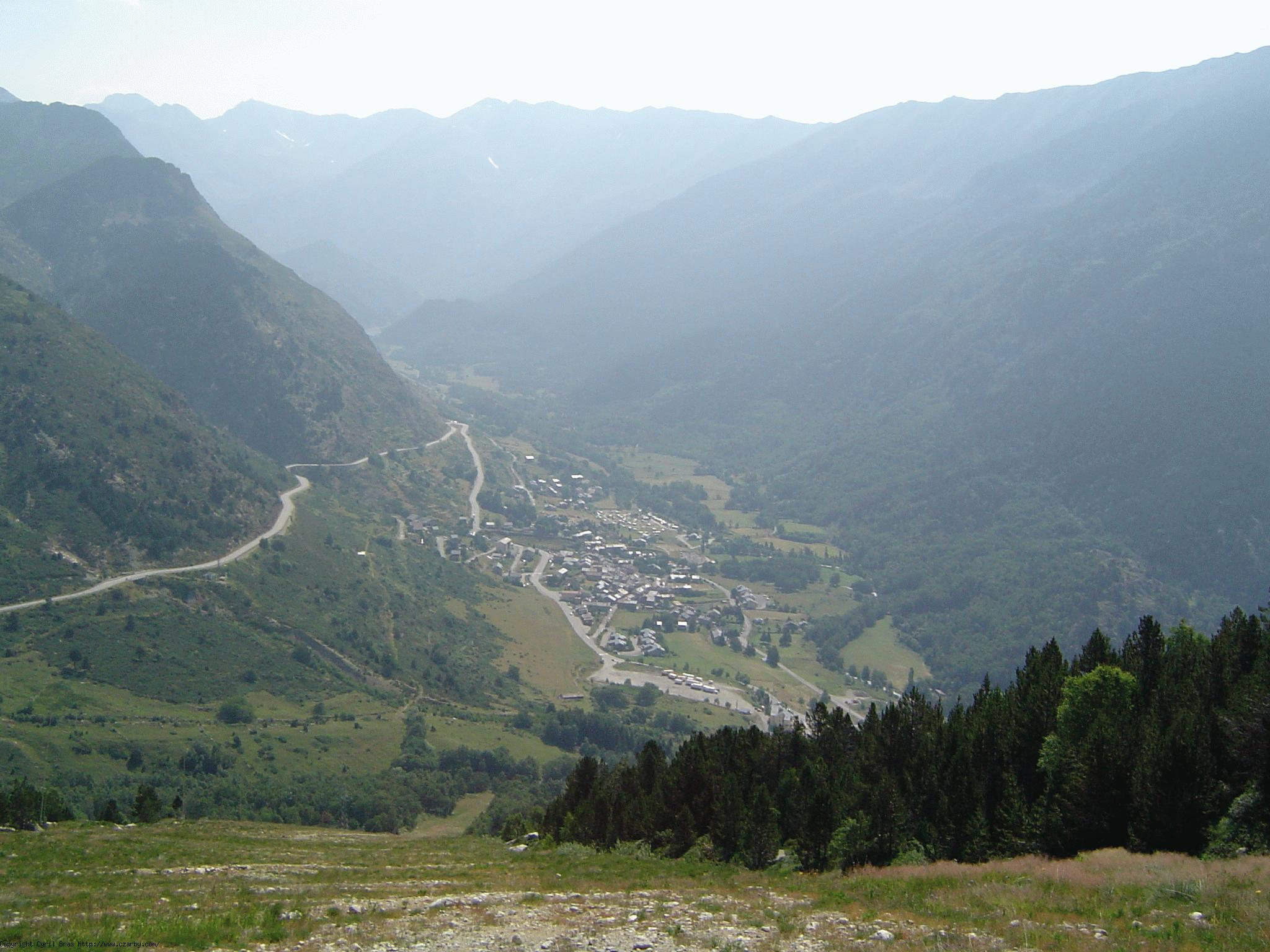
- A view of Porté-Puymorens at the foot of Puig Carlit
- Location of Porté-Puymorens
- Location within France Location within Occitanie
- Coordinates: 42°32′57″N 1°49′57″E
- Country: France
- Region: Occitania
- Department: Pyrénées-Orientales
- Arrondissement: Prades
- Canton: Les Pyrénées catalanes
- Intercommunality: Pyrénées Cerdagne

Government
  - Mayor (2023–2026): Jean-Philippe Augé
- Area^{1}: 49.42 km^{2} (19.08 sq mi)
- Elevation: 1,610 m (5,280 ft)
- Highest elevation: 2,827 m (9,275 ft)
- Lowest elevation: 1,557 m (5,108 ft)
- Population (2023): 100
  - Density: 2.0/km^{2} (5.2/sq mi)
- Time zone: UTC+01:00 (CET)
  - Summer (DST): UTC+02:00 (CEST)
- INSEE/Postal code: 66147 /66760
- ^{1} French Land Register data, which excludes lakes, ponds, glaciers > 1 km^{2} (0.386 sq mi or 247 acres) and river estuaries.

Porté-Puymorens (French pronunciation: [pɔʁte pɥimɔʁɛ̃s]; Catalan: Portè) is a commune in the Pyrénées-Orientales department in southern France.

== Geography ==
Porté-Puymorens is located in the canton of Les Pyrénées catalanes and in the arrondissement of Prades. Porté-Puymorens station has rail connections to Toulouse, Foix and Latour-de-Carol.

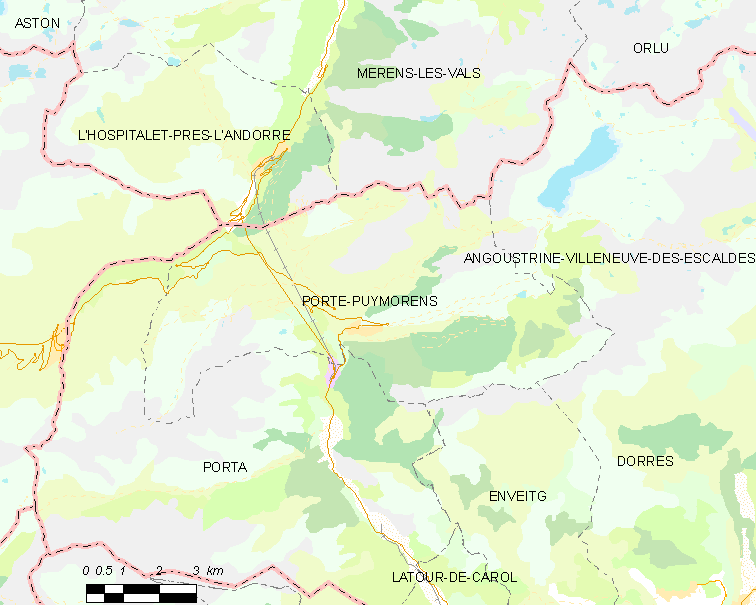
Map of Porté-Puymorens and its surrounding communes

== Population ==
Historical population
Year	Pop.	±% p.a.
1968	108	—
1975	113	+0.65%
1982	119	+0.74%
1990	121	+0.21%
1999	147	+2.19%
2007	124	−2.10%
2012	134	+1.56%
2017	101	−5.50%
2023	100	−0.17%
Source: INSEE

== See also ==
- Communes of the Pyrénées-Orientales department
