= Nahuja =

Nahuja Naüja
- Commune
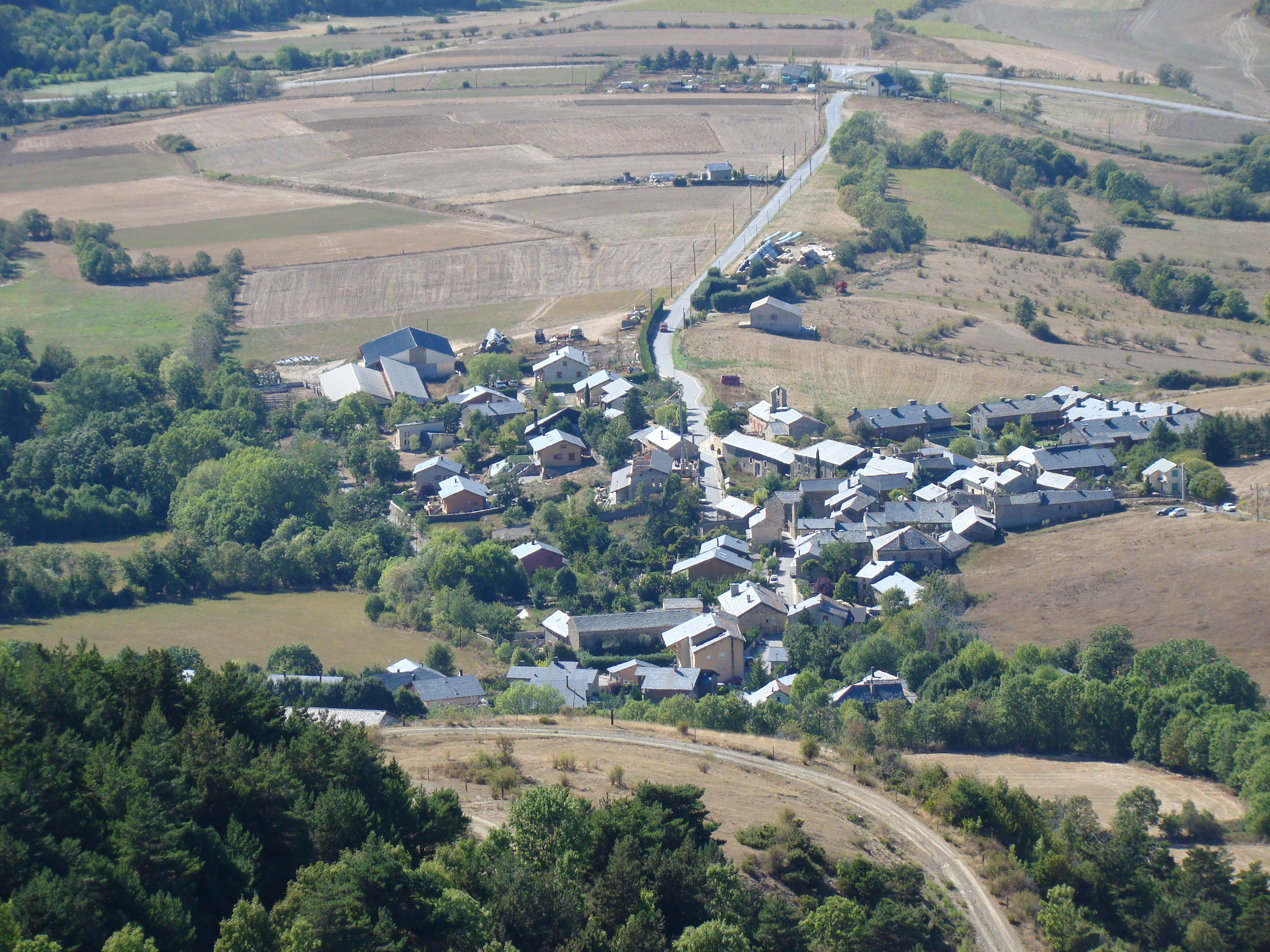
- An aerial view of Nahuja

- Coat of arms
- Location of Nahuja
- Location within France Location within Occitanie
- Coordinates: 42°25′33″N 1°59′45″E
- Country: France
- Region: Occitania
- Department: Pyrénées-Orientales
- Arrondissement: Prades
- Canton: Les Pyrénées catalanes
- Intercommunality: Pyrénées Cerdagne

Government
  - Mayor (2020–2026): Francine Majoral
- Area^{1}: 5.60 km^{2} (2.16 sq mi)
- Elevation: 1,350 m (4,430 ft)
- Highest elevation: 1,888 m (6,194 ft)
- Lowest elevation: 1,196 m (3,924 ft)
- Population (2023): 74
  - Density: 13/km^{2} (34/sq mi)
- Time zone: UTC+01:00 (CET)
  - Summer (DST): UTC+02:00 (CEST)
- INSEE/Postal code: 66120 /66340
- ^{1} French Land Register data, which excludes lakes, ponds, glaciers > 1 km^{2} (0.386 sq mi or 247 acres) and river estuaries.

Nahuja (French pronunciation: [na.yʒa]; Catalan: Naüja) is a small village in the Cerdanya which is part of the Pyrénées-Orientales department in southern France. It is only 8 km far from the Spanish border in Puigcerdà. Its closest neighbour towns are Osséja and Sainte-Léocadie.

== Geography ==
Nahuja is located in the canton of Les Pyrénées catalanes and in the arrondissement of Prades.

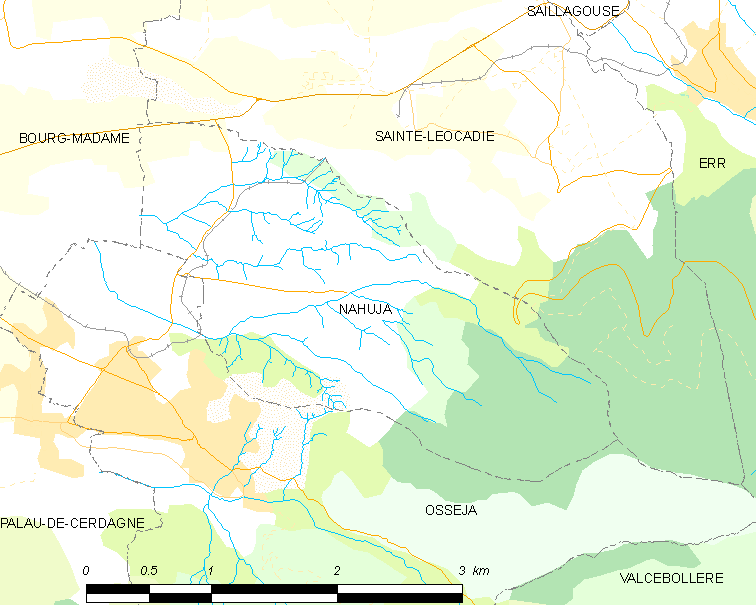
Map of Nahuja and its surrounding communes

== Population ==
Historical population
Year	Pop.	±% p.a.
1968	48	—
1975	37	−3.65%
1982	45	+2.84%
1990	43	−0.57%
1999	63	+4.34%
2007	69	+1.14%
2012	66	−0.89%
2017	76	+2.86%
2023	74	−0.44%
Source: INSEE

== See also ==
- Communes of the Pyrénées-Orientales department
- Hiking around Nahuja
