= Valcebollère =

Valcebollère Vallcebollera
- Commune
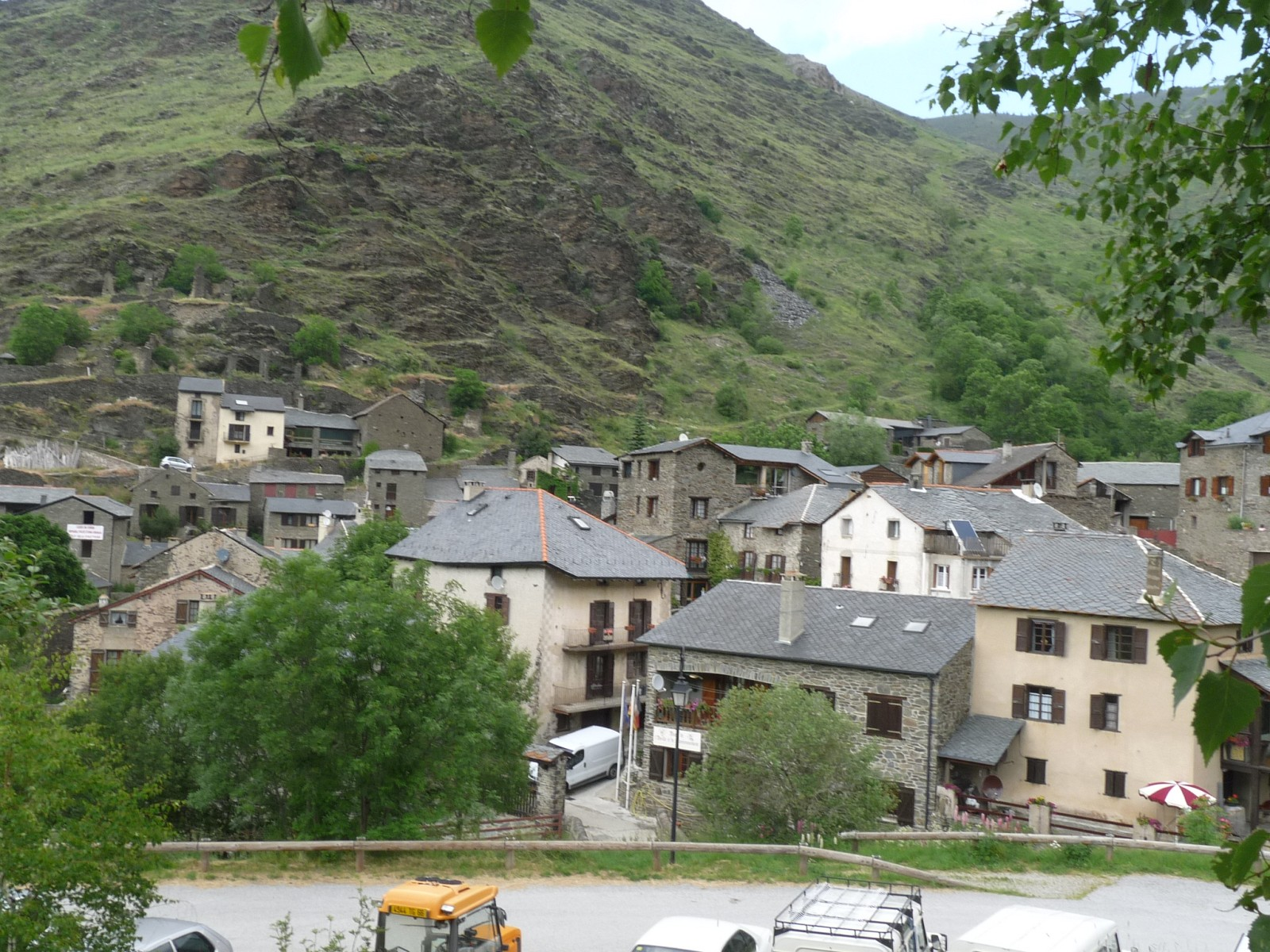
- A general view of Valcebollère
- Location of Valcebollère
- Location within France Location within Occitanie
- Coordinates: 42°23′18″N 2°02′09″E
- Country: France
- Region: Occitania
- Department: Pyrénées-Orientales
- Arrondissement: Prades
- Canton: Les Pyrénées catalanes
- Intercommunality: Pyrénées Cerdagne

Government
  - Mayor (2020–2026): Jean-Claude Ribelaygue
- Area^{1}: 26.03 km^{2} (10.05 sq mi)
- Elevation: 1,247 m (4,091 ft)
- Highest elevation: 2,661 m (8,730 ft)
- Lowest elevation: 1,339 m (4,393 ft)
- Population (2023): 34
  - Density: 1.3/km^{2} (3.4/sq mi)
- Time zone: UTC+01:00 (CET)
  - Summer (DST): UTC+02:00 (CEST)
- INSEE/Postal code: 66220 /66340
- ^{1} French Land Register data, which excludes lakes, ponds, glaciers > 1 km^{2} (0.386 sq mi or 247 acres) and river estuaries.

Valcebollère (French pronunciation: [valsəbɔjɛʁ]; Catalan: Vallcebollera) is a commune in the Pyrénées-Orientales department in southern France.

== Geography ==
Valcebollère is located in the canton of Les Pyrénées catalanes and in the arrondissement of Prades.

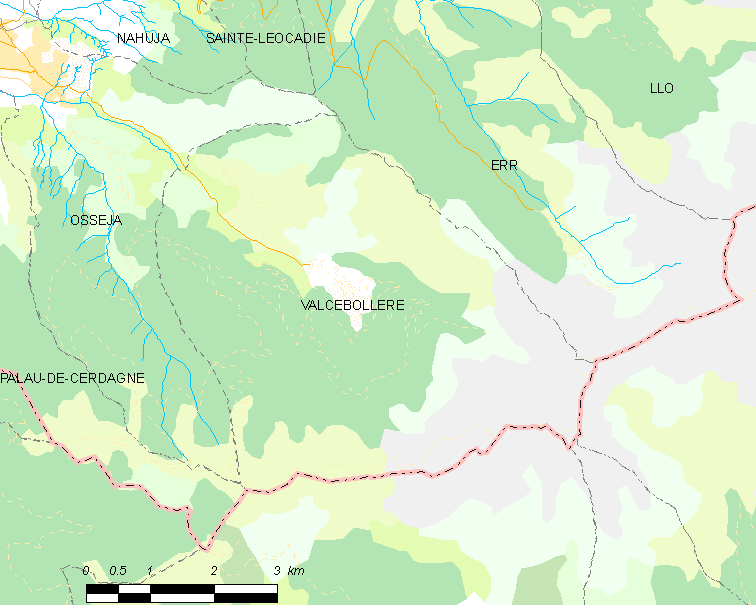
Map of Valcebollère and its surrounding communes

== Population ==
Historical population
Year	Pop.	±% p.a.
1968	26	—
1975	23	−1.74%
1982	25	+1.20%
1990	37	+5.02%
1999	49	+3.17%
2007	39	−2.81%
2012	47	+3.80%
2017	42	−2.22%
2023	34	−3.46%
Source: INSEE

== See also ==
- Communes of the Pyrénées-Orientales department
