= Saint-Pierre-dels-Forcats =

Saint-Pierre-dels-Forcats Sant Pere dels Forcats
- Commune
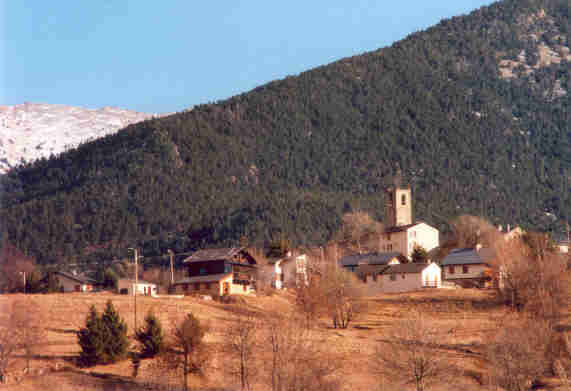
- A view of Saint-Pierre-dels-Forcats, from La Cabanasse

- Coat of arms
- Location of Saint-Pierre-dels-Forcats
- Location within France Location within Occitanie
- Coordinates: 42°29′44″N 2°07′09″E
- Country: France
- Region: Occitania
- Department: Pyrénées-Orientales
- Arrondissement: Prades
- Canton: Les Pyrénées catalanes

Government
  - Mayor (2020–2026): Pierre Blanqué
- Area^{1}: 12.81 km^{2} (4.95 sq mi)
- Elevation: 1,571 m (5,154 ft)
- Highest elevation: 2,750 m (9,020 ft)
- Lowest elevation: 1,320 m (4,330 ft)
- Population (2023): 260
  - Density: 20/km^{2} (53/sq mi)
- Time zone: UTC+01:00 (CET)
  - Summer (DST): UTC+02:00 (CEST)
- INSEE/Postal code: 66188 /66210
- ^{1} French Land Register data, which excludes lakes, ponds, glaciers > 1 km^{2} (0.386 sq mi or 247 acres) and river estuaries.

Saint-Pierre-dels-Forcats (Catalan: Sant Pere dels Forcats) is a commune in the Pyrénées-Orientales department in southern France.

== Geography ==
Saint-Pierre-dels-Forcats is located in the canton of Les Pyrénées catalanes and in the arrondissement of Prades.

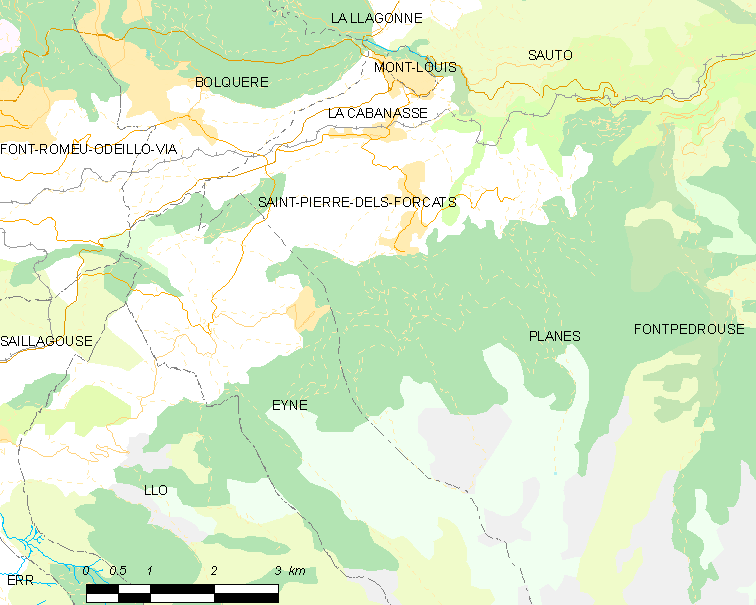
Map of Saint-Pierre-dels-Forcats and its surrounding communes

== Population ==
Historical population
Year	Pop.	±% p.a.
1968	114	—
1975	166	+5.52%
1982	156	−0.88%
1990	185	+2.15%
1999	213	+1.58%
2007	233	+1.13%
2012	264	+2.53%
2017	267	+0.23%
2023	260	−0.44%
Source: INSEE

== See also ==
- Communes of the Pyrénées-Orientales department
