= Formiguères =

- Commune
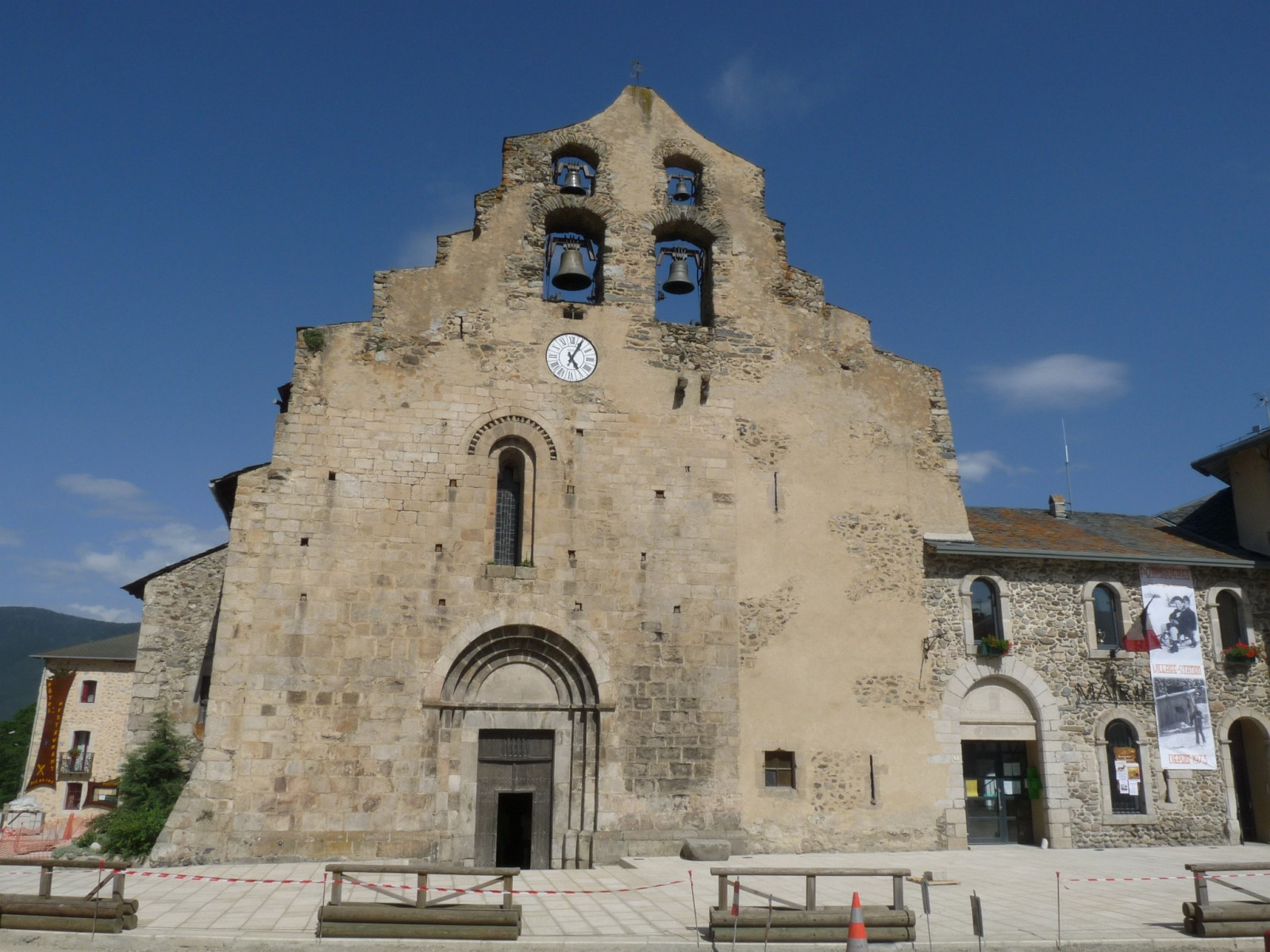
- The church of Sainte-Marie, in Formiguères

- Coat of arms
- Location of Formiguères
- Location within France Location within Occitanie
- Coordinates: 42°36′56″N 2°06′09″E
- Country: France
- Region: Occitania
- Department: Pyrénées-Orientales
- Arrondissement: Prades
- Canton: Les Pyrénées catalanes

Government
  - Mayor (2020–2026): Philippe Petitqueux
- Area^{1}: 46.88 km^{2} (18.10 sq mi)
- Elevation: 1,500 m (4,900 ft)
- Highest elevation: 2,808 m (9,213 ft)
- Lowest elevation: 1,428 m (4,685 ft)
- Population (2023): 494
  - Density: 10.5/km^{2} (27.3/sq mi)
- Time zone: UTC+01:00 (CET)
  - Summer (DST): UTC+02:00 (CEST)
- INSEE/Postal code: 66082 /66210
- ^{1} French Land Register data, which excludes lakes, ponds, glaciers > 1 km^{2} (0.386 sq mi or 247 acres) and river estuaries.

Formiguères (French pronunciation: [fɔʁmiɡɛʁ]; Catalan: Formiguera) is a commune in the Pyrénées-Orientales department in southern France.

Its inhabitants are called Formiguérois.

== Geography ==
Formiguères is located in the canton of Les Pyrénées catalanes and in the arrondissement of Prades.

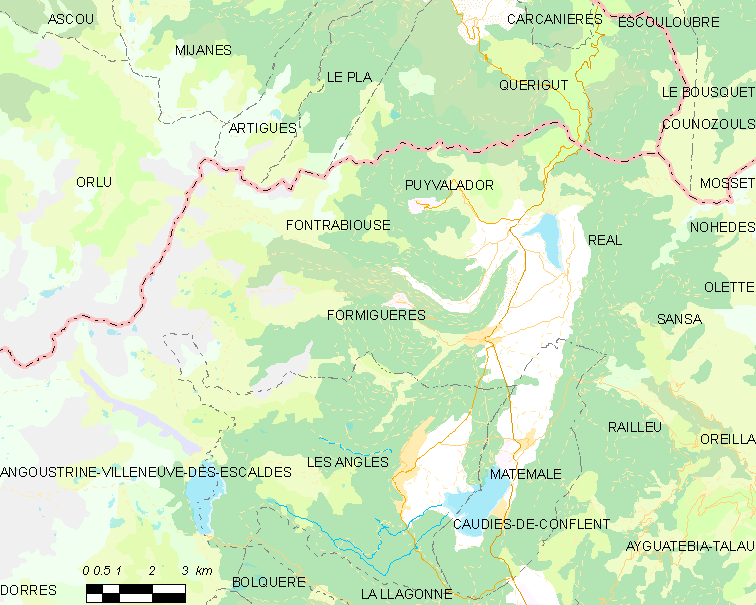
Map of Formiguères and its surrounding communes

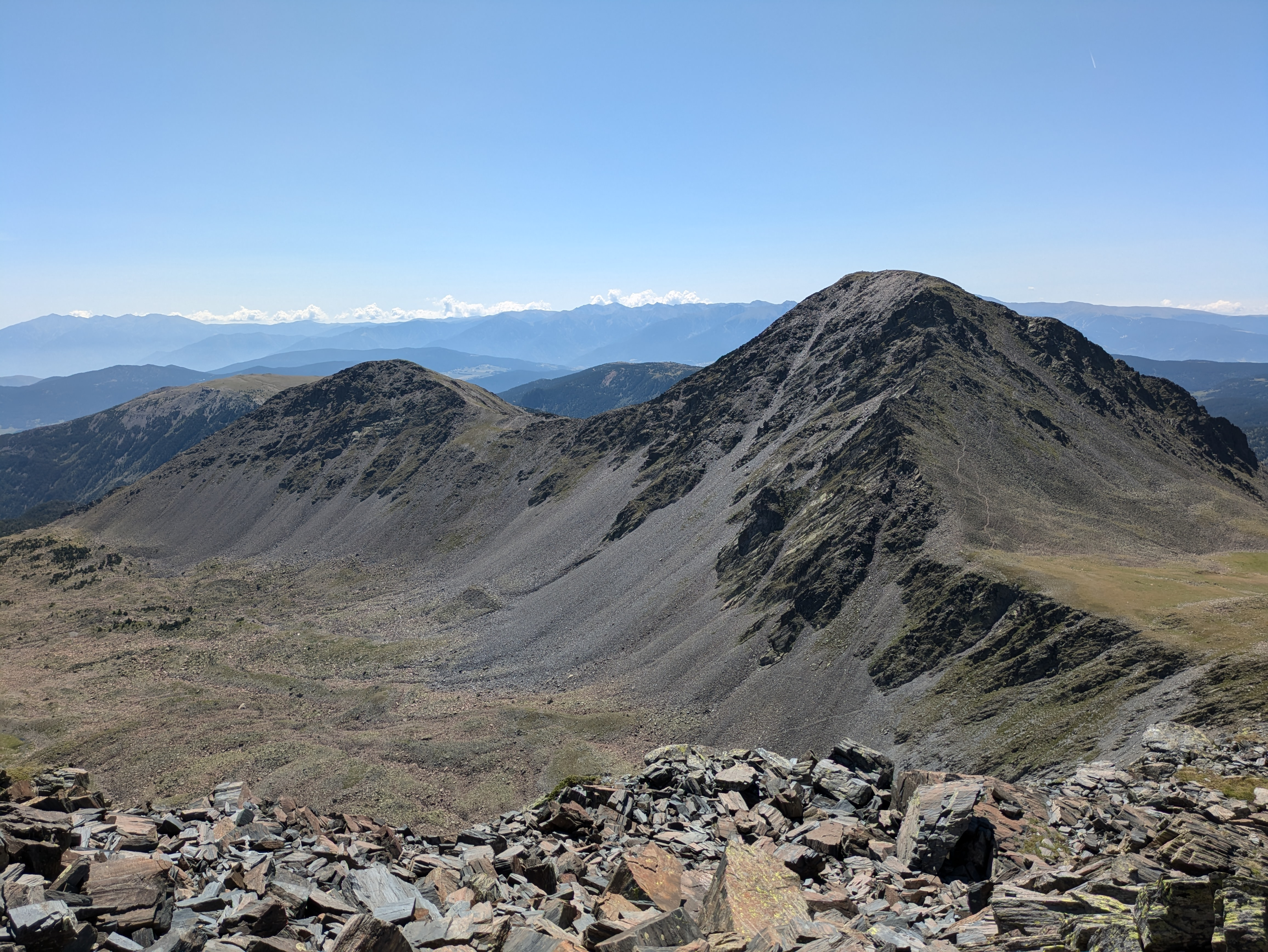
Puig Peric (2810 metres), the highest point in the commune.

== Climate ==
On average, Formiguères experiences 143.4 days per year with a minimum temperature below 0 °C (32.0 °F), 9.1 days per year with a minimum temperature below −10 °C (14.0 °F), 15.5 days per year with a maximum temperature below 0 °C (32.0 °F), and 2.3 days per year with a maximum temperature above 30 °C (86.0 °F). The record high temperature was 35.2 °C (95.4 °F) on 18 August 2012, while the record low temperature was −18.6 °C (−1.5 °F) on 11 March 2010.

Climate data for Formiguères (1991–2020 normals, extremes 2005–present)
Month	Jan	Feb	Mar	Apr	May	Jun	Jul	Aug	Sep	Oct	Nov	Dec	Year
Record high °C (°F)	20.7 (69.3)	18.6 (65.5)	20.9 (69.6)	23.9 (75.0)	29.9 (85.8)	32.6 (90.7)	33.9 (93.0)	35.2 (95.4)	28.5 (83.3)	29.0 (84.2)	22.7 (72.9)	18.6 (65.5)	35.2 (95.4)
Mean daily maximum °C (°F)	5.8 (42.4)	5.8 (42.4)	8.4 (47.1)	11.8 (53.2)	14.9 (58.8)	18.9 (66.0)	22.1 (71.8)	21.9 (71.4)	18.5 (65.3)	15.2 (59.4)	9.2 (48.6)	6.8 (44.2)	13.3 (55.9)
Daily mean °C (°F)	0.9 (33.6)	0.7 (33.3)	3.1 (37.6)	6.2 (43.2)	9.2 (48.6)	12.9 (55.2)	15.4 (59.7)	15.3 (59.5)	12.1 (53.8)	9.3 (48.7)	4.1 (39.4)	1.6 (34.9)	7.6 (45.6)
Mean daily minimum °C (°F)	−4.1 (24.6)	−4.5 (23.9)	−2.2 (28.0)	0.5 (32.9)	3.5 (38.3)	6.8 (44.2)	8.8 (47.8)	8.7 (47.7)	5.7 (42.3)	3.4 (38.1)	−0.9 (30.4)	−3.5 (25.7)	1.9 (35.3)
Record low °C (°F)	−17.9 (−0.2)	−17.0 (1.4)	−18.6 (−1.5)	−10.4 (13.3)	−5.1 (22.8)	−2.3 (27.9)	0.0 (32.0)	−1.2 (29.8)	−4.6 (23.7)	−8.2 (17.2)	−14.2 (6.4)	−15.4 (4.3)	−18.6 (−1.5)
Average precipitation mm (inches)	62.1 (2.44)	40.9 (1.61)	57.6 (2.27)	65.4 (2.57)	72.2 (2.84)	73.9 (2.91)	68.4 (2.69)	64.7 (2.55)	58.3 (2.30)	54.5 (2.15)	78.0 (3.07)	41.3 (1.63)	737.3 (29.03)
Average precipitation days (≥ 1.0 mm)	8.5	6.9	8.9	10.9	9.7	9.7	7.6	6.6	6.6	6.6	7.7	6.0	95.7
Source: Meteociel

== Population ==
Historical population
Year	Pop.	±% p.a.
1968	370	—
1975	313	−2.36%
1982	312	−0.05%
1990	357	+1.70%
1999	434	+2.19%
2007	437	+0.09%
2012	422	−0.70%
2017	479	+2.57%
2023	494	+0.52%
Source: INSEE

== See also ==
- Communes of the Pyrénées-Orientales department
