= Canton of Les Pyrénées catalanes =

Overview and list of communes

Coordinates: 42.62°N 2.42°E

The canton of Les Pyrénées catalanes is an administrative division of the Pyrénées-Orientales department, in Southern France. It was created at the French canton reorganisation which came into effect in March 2015. Its seat is in Prades.

== List of communes ==
It consists of the following 62 communes:

1. Les Angles
2. Angoustrine-Villeneuve-des-Escaldes
3. Ayguatébia-Talau
4. Bolquère
5. Bourg-Madame
6. La Cabanasse
7. Campôme
8. Canaveilles
9. Catllar
10. Caudiès-de-Conflent
11. Clara-Villerach
12. Codalet
13. Conat
14. Dorres
15. Égat
16. Enveitg
17. Err
18. Escaro
19. Estavar
20. Eus
21. Eyne
22. Font-Romeu-Odeillo-Via
23. Fontpédrouse
24. Fontrabiouse
25. Formiguères
26. Jujols
27. Latour-de-Carol
28. La Llagonne
29. Llo
30. Los Masos
31. Matemale
32. Molitg-les-Bains
33. Mont-Louis
34. Mosset
35. Nahuja
36. Nohèdes
37. Nyer
38. Olette
39. Oreilla
40. Osséja
41. Palau-de-Cerdagne
42. Planès
43. Porta
44. Porté-Puymorens
45. Prades
46. Puyvalador
47. Railleu
48. Réal
49. Ria-Sirach
50. Saillagouse
51. Sainte-Léocadie
52. Saint-Pierre-dels-Forcats
53. Sansa
54. Sauto
55. Serdinya
56. Souanyas
57. Targasonne
58. Thuès-Entre-Valls
59. Ur
60. Urbanya
61. Valcebollère
62. Villefranche-de-Conflent
