= Monastery of Saint-André d'Eixalada =

Benedictine monastery in Nyer, France

General information
- Type: Monastery
- Architectural style: Pre-Romanesque art and architecture
- Location: Nyer commune, Pyrénées-Orientales department, Languedoc-Roussillon region., France
- Coordinates: 42°32′02″N 02°15′23″E
- Inaugurated: 840 or 841
- Closed: 878
- Owner: Municipality of Nyer
- Affiliation: Dedicated to Andrew the Apostle

Design and construction
- Awards: Monument historique (1973, church) Monument historique (1975, dovecote, elevations, façade and roof)
- Designations: Belongs to the Benedictines order, adscribed to the Roman Catholic Diocese of Perpignan-Elne

The Monastery of Saint-André d'Eixalada (Catalan: Sant Andreu d'Eixalada) was a Benedictine Christian monastery active in the 9th century in the eastern Pyrenees (now the French department of Pyrénées-Orientales). Founded on the banks of the River Têt no later than 840–841, the site suffered flood devastation in 878.

Founded by members of the same family, the Saint-André d'Eixalada monastery initially experienced a period of stagnation and poverty, until the arrival of new, much wealthier monks in 854. The wealthiest of them, Protasius, was also a dynamic man. Under his impetus, the monastery increased its possessions and influence, notably obtaining a diploma from Charles the Bald, King of the Franks, in 871, making it a royal abbey.

By 878, the abbey was at its peak. Both protégé and ally of the Count of Conflent, Miro the Elder, played a part in his conquest of the County of Roussillon. At the end of the same year, the Saint-André d'Eixalada monastery was destroyed by a flood. Such was the damage that the surviving monks decided to abandon the site and found a new abbey downstream, at Cuxa, on land belonging to Protasius.

== Location ==
The Têt is a river that rises in the Pyrenees at the foot of the Carlit summit, before joining a vast high plateau (the Cerdanya, whose historic capital is Llívia) at Bolquère. As it flows around the citadel of Mont-Louis, it enters a graben that forms a deep valley with numerous canyons. From Prades onwards, the river widens, then crosses the Roussillon plain before flowing into the Mediterranean shortly after Perpignan. The Têt valley, between Cerdanya and Roussillon, is called the Conflent. Haut Conflent is the steep, incised part, Bas Conflent the broad valley that follows.

This region is influenced by the Mediterranean climate of the Roussillon plain, hot and dry in summer, with occasional heavy rains (referred to as "cévenol episodes") in late summer and autumn. Like all the Pyrenees, the Conflent region is home to numerous hot springs that have been used for thermal baths since ancient times, and were venerated by pagan peoples before the arrival of Christianity. Numerous human communities (villages, monasteries) have sprung up near these springs over the millennia.

The Saint-André d'Eixalada monastery was built on the right bank of the Têt, close to hot thermal sources, known as Eixalada springs, at a point where the coastal river has cut a defile (Graus defile). Today, several hot water springs are found near this site, and in the nineteenth and twentieth centuries, there was an active spa about a kilometer upstream: the Thuès-les-Bains spa, now a locality including a specialized nursing home, about two kilometers downstream from the commune of Thuès-Entre-Valls. The site of the vanished monastery lies on the edge of Route Nationale 116, at the end of the Graus defile. Here, the right bank of the Têt belongs to the commune of Nyer, while the left bank is part of the commune of Canaveilles.

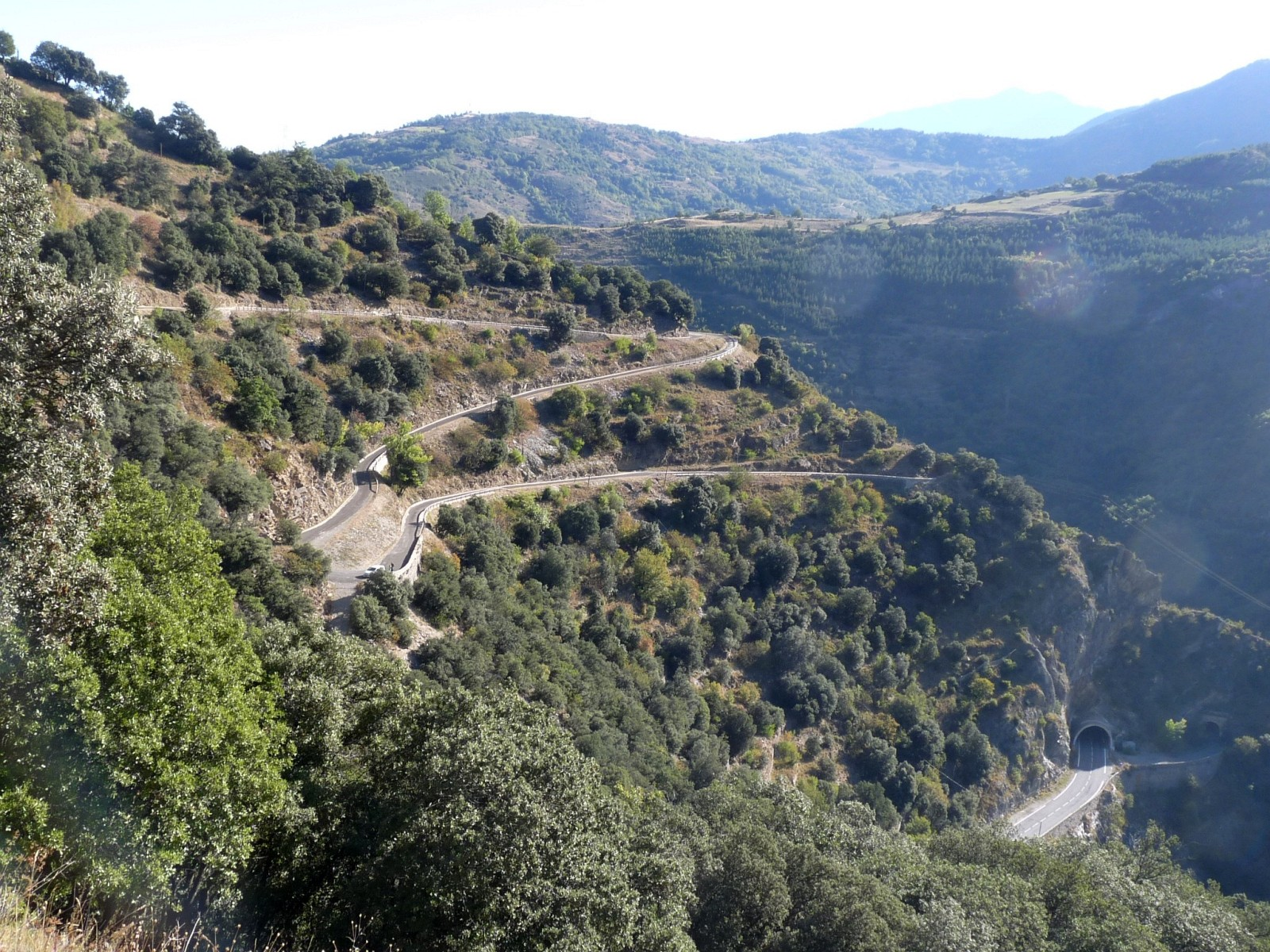
The Défilé des Graus

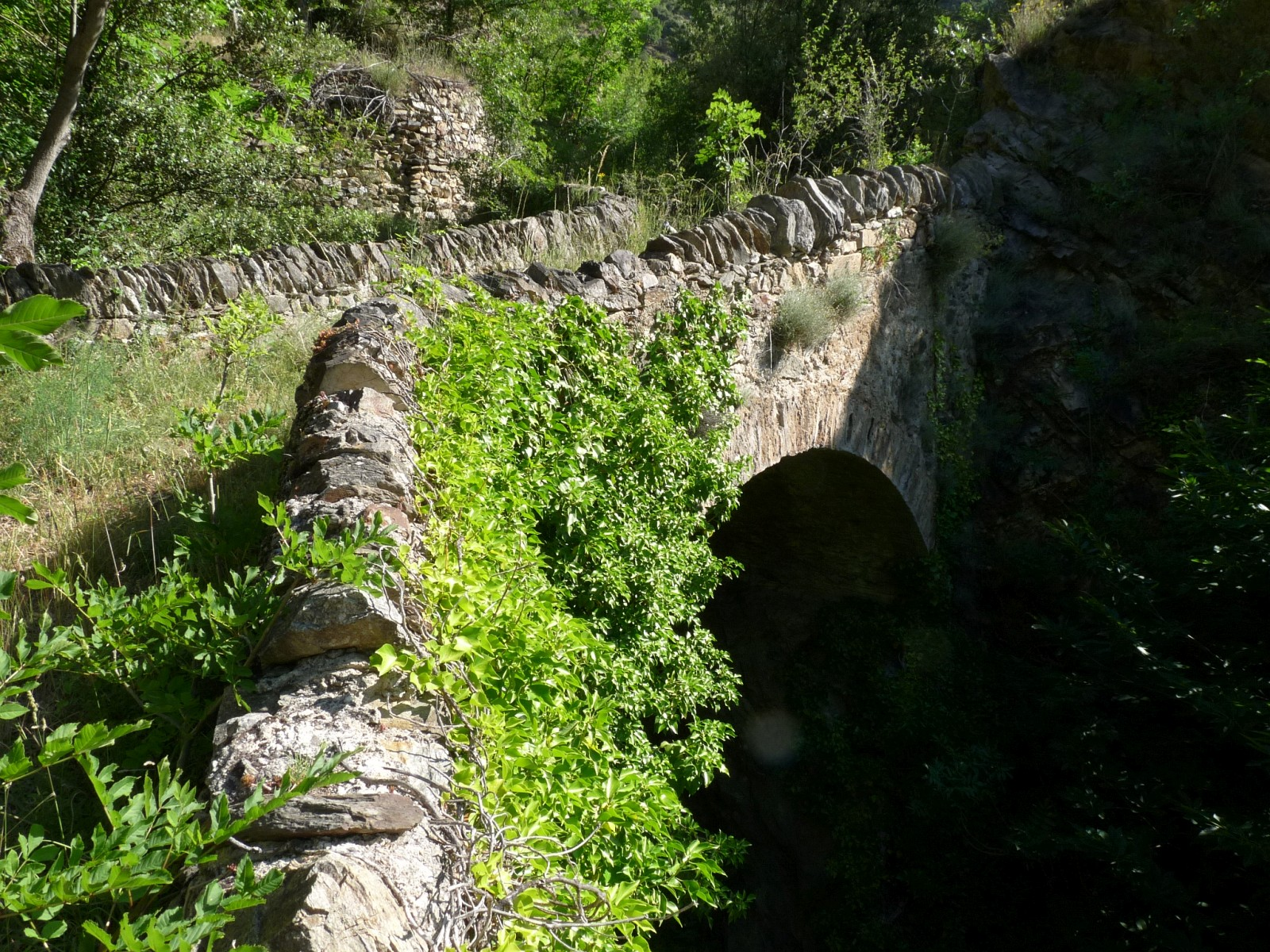
Old access road to Eixalada.

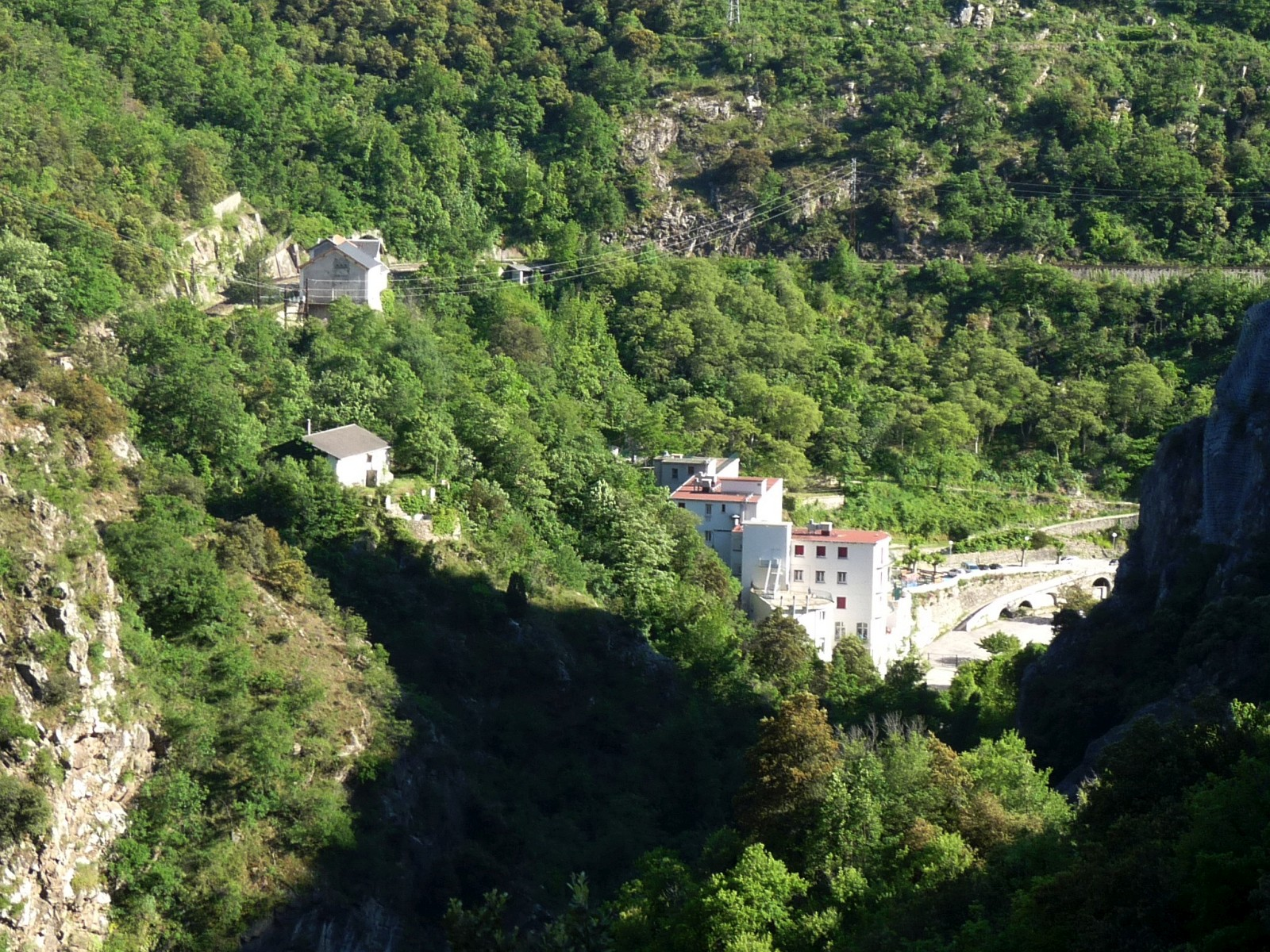
Thuès-les-Bains, nestled in the river Têt valley.

== Toponymy ==
Several explanations have been given for the word Eixalada, sometimes spelt Exalada.

The Catalan word eixalada (from the verb eixalar) means "cut". This toponym, and others like it (Xalada, Lassada), is fairly common in northern Catalonia and refers to steep places.

The most likely origin of the toponym Eixalada is the Latin verb caelare ("to cut") with the prefix ex. Other etymologies have been proposed, based on the topography and characteristics of the place: based on acquis ("waters"), exire ("to go out", the place is at the exit of a defile), scala ("ladder", stepped ascent, which corresponds to the current name of Graus), or laxicare ("to let go"). The presence of thermal springs has also led some authors to associate the name with the verb exhalare ("to exhale").

The monastery is named Saint-André because it is dedicated to Andrew the Apostle, one of Jesus' first disciples.

== History ==
=== Context ===
During the late seventh and early ninth centuries, Charlemagne's troops succeeded in driving back the Saracens (Muslims) south of the Pyrenees. To reinforce the newly conquered territories, Charlemagne founded the Spanish March, a group of counties linked to the emperor. In the Catalan counties to the east of the Pyrenees, numerous monasteries were founded to clear, populate and manage these new territories under Frankish rule, and to propagate and strengthen the Christian faith.

These monasteries grew, when they could, thanks to donations, land purchases, and the privileges granted to them by the Carolingian kings in texts known as diplomas. Seventeen Catalan monasteries received royal diplomas during the ninth century. In many cases, these monasteries had modest and difficult beginnings, and many failed and disappeared.

=== Family foundation ===
The first text to mention Saint-André d'Eixalda dates back to 840 or 841, when a group of fourteen people from the same family donated an inheritance of a farm (vilar) named Paulià, which they had inherited from their grandparents or earlier (the land may have been in the family for over a hundred years). This could be the founding text of the monastery. The names of the donors are mentioned in the document: Erall, Adanasinda, Forídia, Adesinda, Major, Goteleba, Quideberga, Quixilo, Alexandre, Vurili, Tructulf, Vuló as well as the priests Comendat and Argemir. Tructulf is mentioned as a monk, along with another man called Concés. A man named Comendat is later mentioned as abbot, although it's not entirely clear whether this is the same person as the donor. The monastery was probably originally made up of the monks Tructulf and Concés and the priest Comendat.

In its early days, the monastery of Saint Andrew of Eixalada was essentially a family enterprise, living modestly, its only possessions being the Vilar Paulià and some scattered lands. This situation hardly changed until 854.

=== Expansion ===
In July 854, although their motives are unknown (they could have founded their own monastery elsewhere), several much wealthier monks from Urgell moved into the Saint-André d'Eixalada monastery, making substantial donations. These included Protasius (sometimes called Protais in French, or Protasi in Catalan), who held the title of archpriest, along with three priests: Sanctiol (or Sanctiolus), Recesvind (or Recceswindus) and Victor, monk Atila and subdeacon Baro. They agree to abide by the rules of the community, but their gift comes with several limitations. They retain usufruct and become each other's heirs: on the death of one of the newcomers, it is his companions who inherit the property, not the monastery. Should they decide to leave the monastery, they would take their property with them. The monastery would only definitively inherit these gifts, according to this agreement, on the death of the last of these donors.

Donations of land, money, tools and livestock were substantial. The richest donor was Protasius. He obtained the status of conversus, which set him apart from the other occupants of the monastery. He kept in his personal estate a sum of money and a piece of land at Cuxa, further down the valley, as well as great freedom in the use of his possessions.

Protasius' role became central to the monastery's development: right up to the end, he was the one who appeared in all the acquisition texts, whether because the land was purchased with his money, or because his influence played a decisive role. From the time of his arrival, the monastery was under two-headed management: it was run jointly by the incumbent abbot and Protasius, who never held the title of abbot at Eixalada.

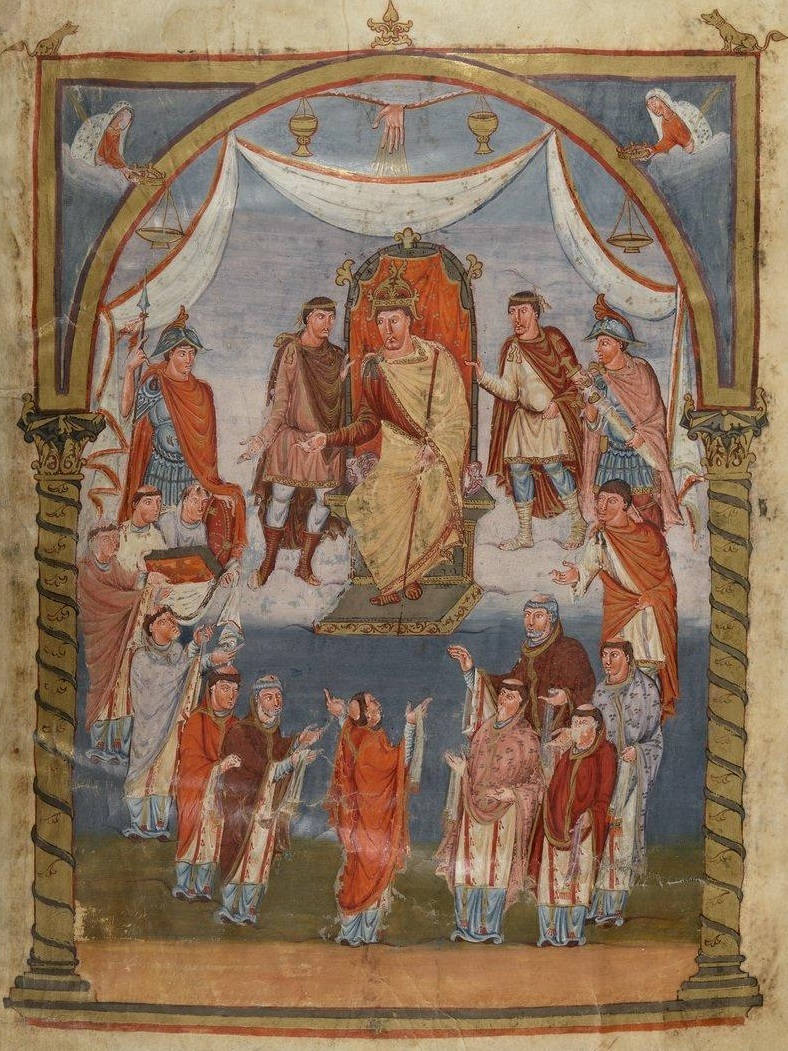
Monks presenting a Bible to Charles II the Bald. First Bible of Charles the Bald, circa 845.

The first text to mention Protasius in the Conflent region dates back to 845, already in Cuxa. Before settling in Eixalada, he acquired several new possessions and gained influence in the region around Cuxa (Taurinya, le Llech and Codalet).

Four months after his arrival, Protasius obtained the donation of the Entrevalls vilar. These lands were fundamental to the monastery's viability: they were adjacent to the community (the text says ubi edificatum est ipsum monasterium: "where this monastery is built"), ensuring its independence.

After 854, the monastery remained undocumented for ten years. During this time, a newcomer never mentioned in previous texts, named Witiza, became abbot of Saint-André.

Protasius founded a church dedicated to Saint Germain on his Cuxa estate, in 866 or earlier, as indicated by a donation text dated that year. Monks reside here.

=== Royal Abbey ===
In 871, the new Count of Conflent, Miro, traveled to Douzy (now in the Ardennes department, on the other side of France) to present himself to the Frankish king Charles the Bald. He obtained a diploma from the king, granting the monastery the title of royal abbey. As a result, the monastery came under the Count's protection, and the management of the monastery, previously in the hands of the abbot and Protasius, was supplemented by a third head in the person of the Count. This text obliged the abbey to follow the Rule of St. Benedict, granted it the free election of its abbot and exempted it from ordinary justice, the payment of cens, and any intervention by the bishop in its internal or religious affairs.

In 874, Baro, one of Protasius' companions from Urgell, became abbot. This probably means that Witiza had died.

In 878, Miron, Count of Conflent, became Count of Roussillon, with the spiritual and logistical support of the monastery, which provided him with both men and the resources of its extensive domain during a conquest that required the use of force.

=== Destruction and aftermath ===
The monastery was destroyed by a flood in 878. According to d'Abadal i de Vinyals, based on dates mentioned in texts, the disaster occurred between 30 August and 13 September. For Pierre Ponsich, who works with flood statistics for the region, the most likely date is October; early September would be an exceptionally early date for this type of episode.

The flood washed away the monastery's buildings and possessions. The church was destroyed, as were the archives. The monks managed to save only the most precious documents, including the royal diploma and cartulary.

After the destruction of Eixalada, Baro was dismissed as a monk in favor of Protasius. It was decided not to rebuild the monastery, but to move it to Cuxa, on Protasius' private land. This brought the community closer to Prades, a rapidly developing town, and to Ria, the birthplace of Count Miron's family. The days of the isolated monastery in the canyons were over, and the abbey took on a growing political role.

In 879, Protasius died. In his will dated 13 September 879, he mentions an abbey of fifty monks accompanied by twenty servants. A later text counts thirty-five monks in the new Cuxa abbey, giving a death toll for the flood of around fifteen monks. The number of other people living in and around the Eixalda monastery is unknown.

After the monastery's destruction, a hamlet remained on the site until the 14th century, when it disappeared. In 1860, the Thuès-les-Bains spa was built.

In 1886, in his epic poem Mount Canigó, the Catalan poet Jacint Verdaguer devoted many verses to the tragedy of Saint-André d'Eixalada and the founding of Saint-Michel de Cuxa.

En Exalada, vora'l camí de Llivia á Prada, monjos ahir teníam temple y monestir, horta florida, vells pergamins que'l cor no oblida, [...] Mes ¡gran desastre! de tot aixó no'n queda rastre; en un moment la revinguda d'un torrent ho ha esborrat y es com si may hagués estat! — Jacint Verdaguer, Canigó, IX.	In Exalade, on the road from Llívia to Prades, the monks, back then owned a temple and monastery, blooming gardens, old parchments that the heart never forgets, [...] But what a disaster! No trace of this remains; in just a moment the might of a stream wiped out everything and it's as if nothing had ever happened! — Jacint Verdaguer, Canigó, IX.

== Possessions ==
Historian Pierre Ponsich has drawn up an inventory of the possessions of the Saint-André d'Eixalada monastery, which have been enriched over time. This inventory is summarized in the following tables.

=== Churches ===
Saint	Village	Current Commune	Date of acquisition or foundation
Saint André	Eixalada	Eyne	840
Saint Sauveur	Llech	Estoher	848
Saint Germain	Cuxa	Codalet	866
Saint Pierre	Eixalada	Canaveilles	871
Saint Thomas	Balaguer	Fontpédrouse	871
Saint Jean	Entresvalls	Thuès-Entre-Valls	871
Saint Vincent	Campllong	Vernet-les-Bains	876

The Saint-Germain de Cuxa church, whose exact location is unknown, was replaced by the Saint-Michel de Cuxa abbey.

According to Lluís Basseda, all that remains of the Saint-Sauveur church are its ruins and a name: Camp de l'Església (Champ de l'Église on the IGN 1:25,000 map), near a ruined farmhouse called Mas Llech.

The churches dedicated to the apostles Peter, Thomas, and John are first mentioned in a diploma issued by Charles the Bald in 871.

Nothing remains of the church of Saint-Thomas, located further up the Têt valley, apart from the name of a place designated Saint-Thomas. Like the monastery, it was built in an area with several thermal springs. Today, a spa called Saint-Thomas-les-Bains is located near the original site.

The church of Saint-Pierre d'Eixalada is also in ruins. The few remains currently visible seem to date from the 11th century.

For d'Abadal, the church of Saint-Jean is impossible to locate. Ponsich places it in Entre-Valls (or Entresvalls), where there is still a church of St. John, perhaps built in the 12th century.

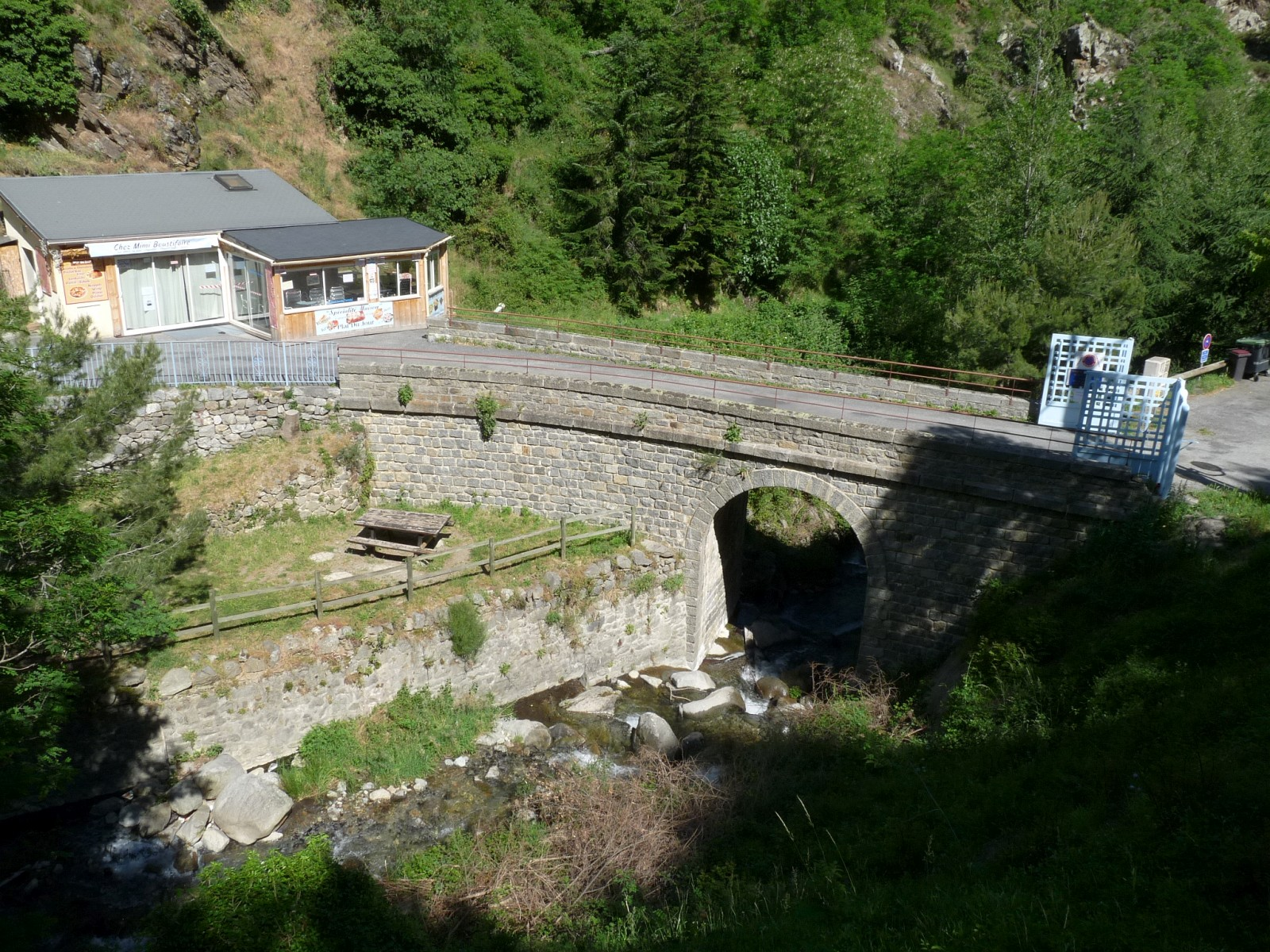
The Saint-Thomas baths in 2014.

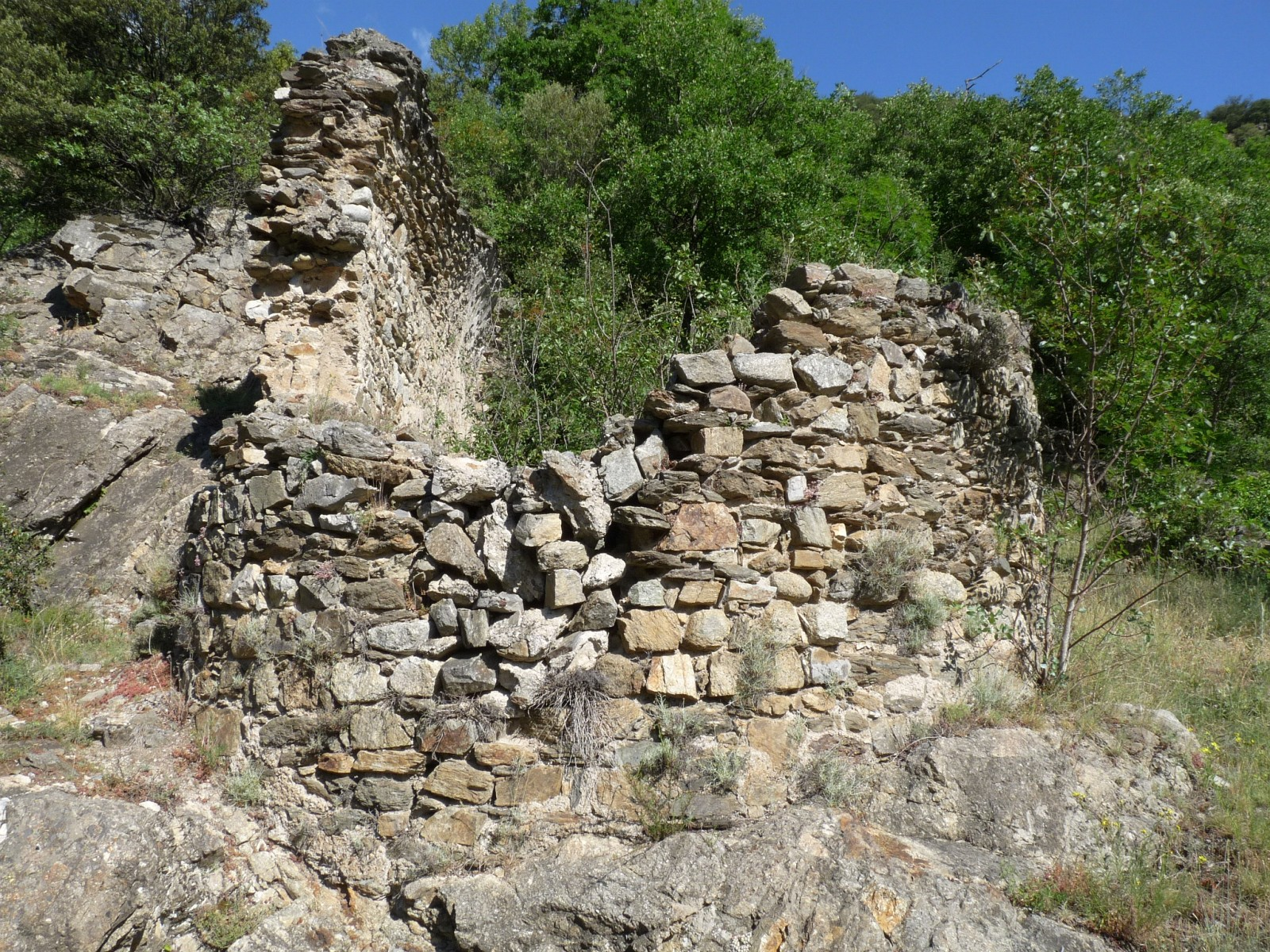
Ruins of Saint-Pierre d'Eixalada church

The church of Saint-Vincent de Campllong has also been reduced to an overgrown ruin, to the extent that the remains of the building are difficult to date.

=== Real estate ===
The first document of 840–841 granted the monastery almost the entire territory of Fuilla, in the middle of the Conflent region. This landholding continued to expand until the catastrophe of 878, with the following acquisitions.

Haut Conflent
Town	Date	Proportion
Eixalada	840 to 846	T
Canaveilles	849 to 879	T
Entrevalls	854 to 879	T
Ocenyes	854 to 879	T
Moncles	864 to 876	T
Tuevol	864 to 876	T
Llar	864 to 878	T
Talau	874 to 878	T
Thuès et Albaret	before 878	T
Balaguer	854–855	P
Sauto	866–876	P
Els Plans	870	P
Marians	874–875	P
Souanyas	874–875	P
Olette	878	P
En	before 878	P

Bas Conflent
Town	Date	Proportion
Cuxa	845–879	T
Taurinya	846–879	T
Codalet	850–879	T
Camplong	876–879	T
Llech	848–879	M
Ria	circa 864	P
Rigarda	circa 864	P
Fillols	870	P
Clara	878	P

Proportion column caption
T: all or almost all the territory of the town

M : most of the area

P : partly

Note

The towns and villages given are historical hamlets, villages or lieux-dits. For example, the village of Souanyas must be distinguished from the present-day French commune of the same name. Here, Souanyas refers to the village, chief town of the commune, which includes the hamlet of Marians.

In addition to holdings around the two abbey sites of Eixalada and Cuxa, the community also acquired land in Cerdanya, Roussillon and Fenouillèdes, all after 854.

== The source problem ==
The monastery's antiquity and history mean that textual sources are rare. Added to this is their unreliability: some have turned out to be forgeries, the tampering having sometimes been carried out by the monks of Saint-André themselves.

Father François Font, in his Histoire de l'abbaye royale de Saint-André d'Exalada (1903), is well aware of these problems. After evoking the legend of the monastery's foundation, he writes:

"When looking for the true date of origin of the Abbey of Saint-André d'Exalada, whose existence goes back such a long way, after having seriously consulted the very varied documents relating to it, initially it seems that impenetrable darkness surrounds it; and one is then led to believe that it might be, as some have said, thanks to this obscurity that rival and jealous ambitions once tried to create fictitious antiquity for it, to trace it back to Pepin and Childeric, even to falsify the charters of Charles the Bald in order to attribute them to Charlemagne – and thus to associate its cradle with the grandeur of the greatest name in Christian Europe. In reality, this is not the case, and it's impossible to think otherwise when authentic documents are at hand, and when one follows in the footsteps of authors who are distinguished as much for their talent as conscientious chroniclers as by their reputation as men of historical integrity – and absolute disinterestedness."

In this work, Font follows other authors in setting the date of the monastery's foundation in 745, during the reign of Childeric III, when Pepin the Short ruled the Frankish kingdom, and places the destructive flood in 779. He draws on a text by Charlemagne known from an 18th-century copy made in Eixalada, as well as a text in Castilian that he himself discovered in the archives of Urgell Cathedral, insisting on the authenticity of these documents.

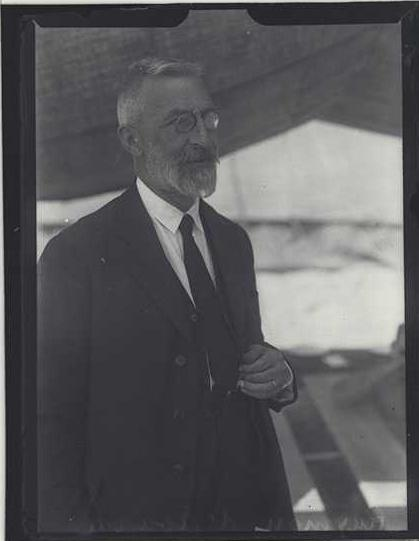
Ramon d'Abadal i de Vinyals

The allegations made by Font and most of his predecessors have not been accepted by contemporary historians. Among early authors, only Pierre de Marca (1594–1662) and Étienne Baluze (1630–1718) managed to avoid being fooled by forgeries. Pierre Ponsich and Ramon d'Abadal i de Vinyals's work in the early 1950s led to the date 840.

In the 15th century, a monk from Cuxa recounts that all but five of the monks at Eixalada were killed by the flood. The 871 diploma given by Charles the Bald dated, in its preamble, presents Protasius and his compatriots from Urgell as having arrived together at Eixalada (including Witiza and later arrivals of Lucà, Guntefred and Leudemir, probably also from Urgell) and as the founders of the monastery.

Some of these falsifications were undoubtedly made to consolidate the monastery's legitimacy over territorial possessions, even though its development did not take place without opposition from the local inhabitants.

== Appendix ==
=== Bibliography ===
==== Ancient works in French ====
- ^{(fr)} Gabriel-Francois de Blay de Gaix, "Étude sur la fondation de l'Abbaye de Saint-Michel-de-Cuxa", Revue d'histoire et archéologie du Roussillon, Perpignan, J. Payret, t. VI, 1905
- ^{(fr)} Jean Capeille, "Protasius", in Dictionnaire de biographies roussillonnaises, Perpignan, 1914
- ^{(fr)} François Font, Histoire de l'abbaye royale de Saint-Martin du Canigou (Diocèse de Perpignan) suivie de la légende et de l'histoire de l'Abbaye de Saint André d'Exalada, Perpignan, C. Latrobe, 1903 (read online archive)

==== Recent publications in French ====
- ^{(fr)} Lluís Basseda, Toponymie historique de Catalunya Nord, t. 1, Prades, Revista Terra Nostra, 1990, 796 p.
- ^{(fr)} Aymat Catafau, "À propos des origines de l'abbaye Sainte-Marie d'Arles-sur-Tech", Bulletin de l'Association Archéologique des Pyrénées-Orientales, no. 15, December 2000.
- ^{(fr)} Mathias Delcor, "Problèmes posés par l'église de Saint-Michel de Cuxa consacrée en 974, et par les églises successives qui l'ont précédé", Les Cahiers des Saint-Michel de Cuxa, no 6, June 1975
- ^{(fr)} Henri Guiter, "Le développement d'un monastère bénédictin à l'époque carolingienne: Saint-André d'Eixalada – Saint-Michel de Cuixà", Bulletin philologique et historique du Comité des travaux historiques et scientifiques, Paris, 1969, pp. 649–658
- ^{(fr)} Géraldine Mallet, Églises romanes oubliées du Roussillon, Montpellier, Les Presses du Languedoc, 2003, 334 p. (ISBN 978-2-85998-244-7)
- ^{(fr)} Pierre Ponsich, "Les origines de Saint-Michel de Cuxa: Saint-André d'Exalada et Saint-Germain de Cuxa", Études roussillonnaises, nos 1–2, 1952, p. 7–19
- ^{(fr)} Pierre Ponsich, "La grande histoire de Saint-Michel de Cuxa au xe siècle", Les Cahiers de Saint-Michel de Cuxa, no. 6, June 1975
- ^{(fr)} Pierre Ponsich, "Saint-André d'Eixalada et la naissance de l'abbaye de Saint-Germain de Cuixa (840–879)", Les Cahiers de Saint-Michel de Cuxa, no 11, 1980, pp. 7–32
- ^{(fr)} Iluís To Figueras, "Fondations monastiques et mémoire familiale en Catalogne (ixe – xie siècle)", in Sauver son âme et se perpétuer: Transmission du patrimoine et mémoire au haut Moyen- ge, Rome, Publications de l'École française de Rome, 2005 (ISBN 978-2-7283-1014-2, read online archive)

==== In Catalan ====
- ^{(ca)} Ramon d'Abadal i de Vinyals, Catalunya carolíngia: els diplomes carolingis a Catalunya, vol. 2, Institut d'Estudis Catalans, 1950, part 1
- ^{(ca)} Ramon d'Abadal i de Vinyals, Com neix i com creix un gran monestir pirinenc abans de l'any mil: Eixalada-Cuixà, Barcelona, Abadia de Montserrat, 1955, 221 p.
- ^{(ca)} "Monestir d'Eixalada" archive, Gran Enciclopèdia Catalana, in enciclopedia.cat, Barcelona, Edicions 62.
- ^{(ca)} "Sant Andreu d'Eixalada", in Catalunya romànica, t. VII: La Cerdanya. El Conflent, Barcelona, Fundació Enciclopèdia Catalana, 1995 (read online archive)

=== Related articles ===
- fr:Liste des églises préromanes des Pyrénées-Orientales
- Abbey of Saint-Michel-de-Cuxa
- Nyer
- Canaveilles
- Têt
- Miro the Elder
