= Pablo Casals Festival =

The Pablo Casals Festival is a music festival in the French Pyrenees created by the cellist and conductor Pablo Casals in 1950.

== History ==
Casals opposed the Francoist regime in Spain which lasted until after his death. As an exile, Prades in the French Pyrenees became his adopted home.

After the Spanish Civil War, he refused to perform in public in protest. Following the Second World War and this long period of silence, he was solicited by music lovers all over the world. He was asked to play again in concert and in particular in 1950 for the bicentenary of the death of Johann Sebastian Bach: in front of his repeated refusal, his friends, and particularly the violinist Alexander Schneider, offered him to come and play at his house in Prades; Pablo Casals accepted. The greatest performers of his time could be found there: (Clara Haskil, Mieczysław Horszowski, Isaac Stern, Marcel Tabuteau, Joseph Szigeti, Rudolf Serkin, Paul Tortelier, etc.) which made it a place of musical fervour Thus was born the Festival de Prades which has continued since that date, seeing the greatest chamber music performers in the world. Pablo Casals still participated at the age of ninety, conducting his oratorio El Pessebre (The Crib), a work written during the war on a poem by his friend Joan Alavedra i Segurañas.

The Festival takes place, among other venues, in one of the jewels of Romanesque Catalonia, the Abbey of Saint-Michel-de-Cuxa, at the feet of the Canigó.

In 1976, at the suggestion of the violinist Fred Muccioli, the Prades Academy of Music was created, which welcomes young musicians and provides master classes for musical instruments and chamber music.

In 2005 the "International Composition Competition of the Pablo Casals Festival of Prades" was created, the winner of which was the German composer Thorsten Encke for his String Quartet (2004). The second edition took place on 14 April 2007 and the prize, with a 15,000 euros reward, was awarded to Hee Yun Kim for Mémoire de Dong-Hak, quintet for flute, clarinet, violin, cello and piano.

== See also ==
- Pablo Casals
- Casals Festival
