= Olette–Canaveilles-les-Bains station =

Railway station in Olette, France

Olette–Canaveilles-les-Bains
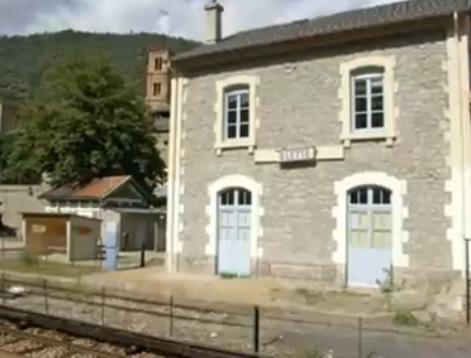
- Olette Station

General information
- Location: Canaveilles, Occitanie, France
- Coordinates: 42.55475°N 2.27197°E
- Line: Ligne de Cerdagne

Other information
- Station code: 87784728

History
- Opened: 1910

Services
Preceding station	TER Occitanie	Following station
Nyer towards Latour-de-Carol	32 (Ligne de Cerdagne)	Joncet towards Villefranche–Vernet-les-Bains
Location

Olette–Canaveilles-les-Bains is a railway station in Canaveilles, Occitanie, southern France. Within TER Occitanie, it is part of line 32 (Latour-de-Carol-Enveitg–Villefranche-Vernet-les-Bains, Train Jaune).
