= Prades, Pyrénées-Orientales =

Subprefecture of Pyrénées-Orientales, Occitanie

Prades Prada de Conflent (Catalan)
- Subprefecture and commune
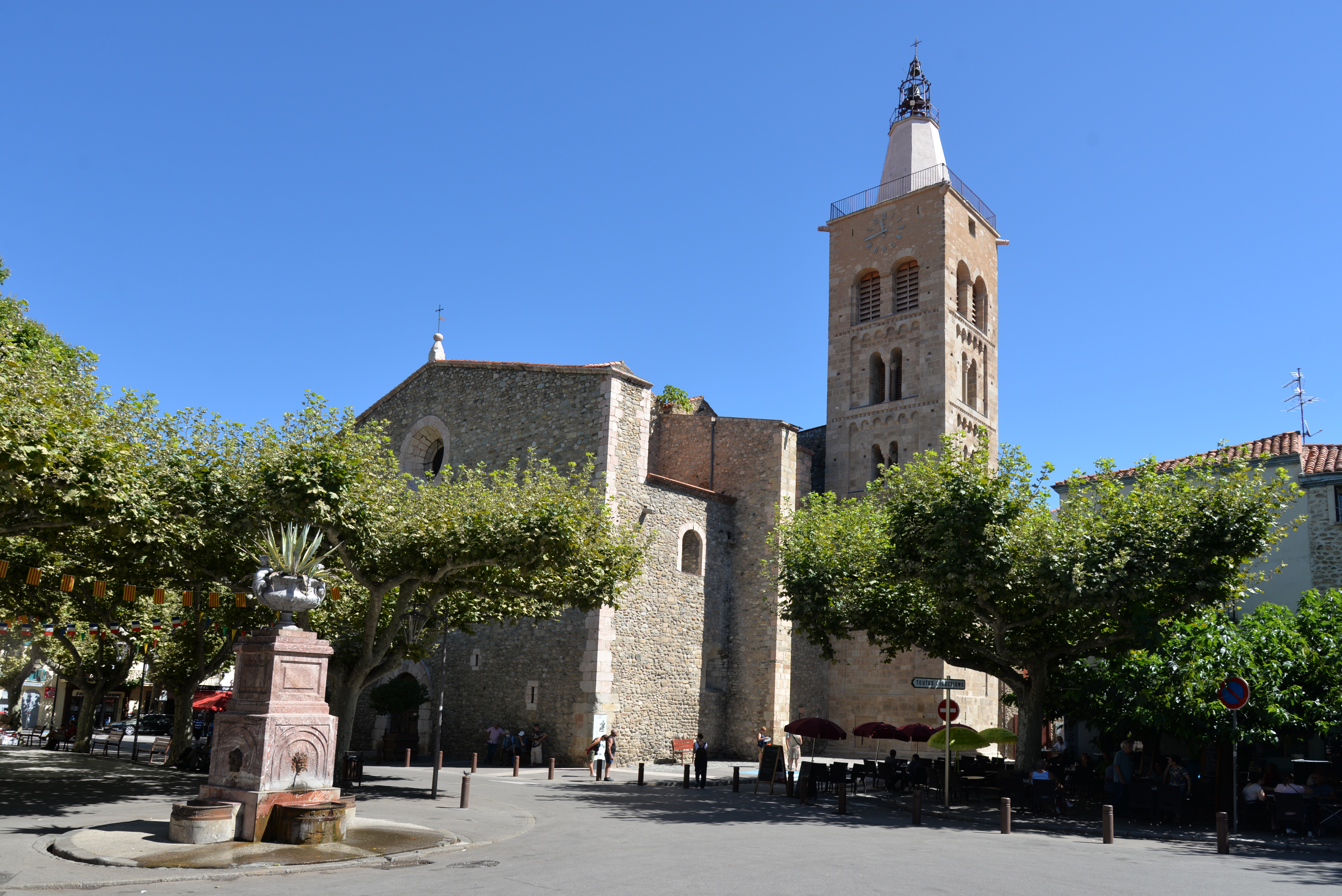
- Église Saint-Pierre

- Coat of arms
- Location of Prades
- Location within France Location within Occitanie
- Coordinates: 42°37′05″N 2°25′22″E
- Country: France
- Region: Occitania
- Department: Pyrénées-Orientales
- Arrondissement: Prades
- Canton: Les Pyrénées catalanes

Government
  - Mayor (2020–2026): Yves Delcor (DVD)
- Area^{1}: 10.87 km^{2} (4.20 sq mi)
- Elevation: 357 m (1,171 ft)
- Highest elevation: 745 m (2,444 ft)
- Lowest elevation: 300 m (980 ft)
- Population (2023): 6,148
  - Density: 565.6/km^{2} (1,465/sq mi)
- Time zone: UTC+01:00 (CET)
  - Summer (DST): UTC+02:00 (CEST)
- INSEE/Postal code: 66149 /66500
- ^{1} French Land Register data, which excludes lakes, ponds, glaciers > 1 km^{2} (0.386 sq mi or 247 acres) and river estuaries.

Prades (French: [pʁad]; Catalan: Prada de Conflent [ˈpɾaðə ðə kuɱˈflen]) is a commune and subprefecture of the Pyrénées-Orientales department in the Occitanie region of Southern France. Prades is the capital of the historical Conflent comarca. Its inhabitants are called Pradéens and Pradéennes in French and Pradencs and Pradenques in Catalan. It is also the hometown of Jean Castex, who served as Prime Minister of France from 2020 to 2022.

== Geography ==
Prades is located in the canton of Les Pyrénées catalanes and in the arrondissement of Prades, in the Pyrenees Mountains next to the Canigó and Têt River. Its nearby towns include Codalet, Eus, Vinça and Villefranche-de-Conflent.

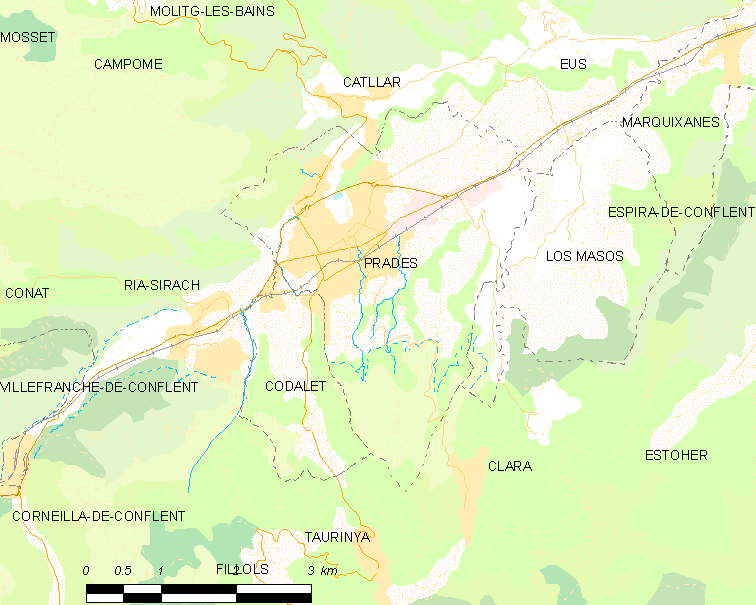
Map of Prades and its surrounding communes

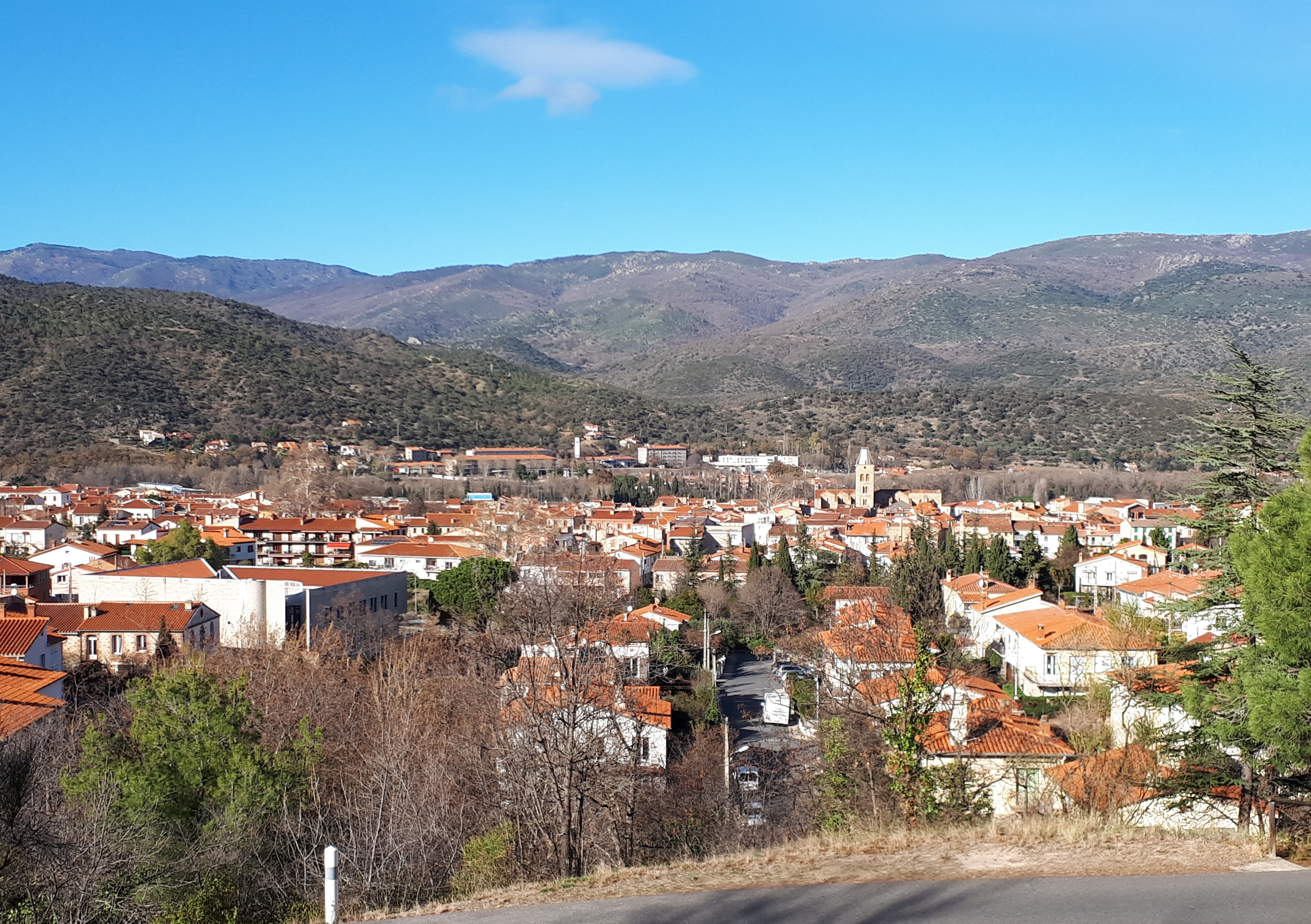
The town of Prades (seen here from the south) is located on a terrace of the River Têt, about 20 metres above the current course of that river. (The Têt follows a course broadly along the line of trees which run from left to right, just beyond the church tower.)

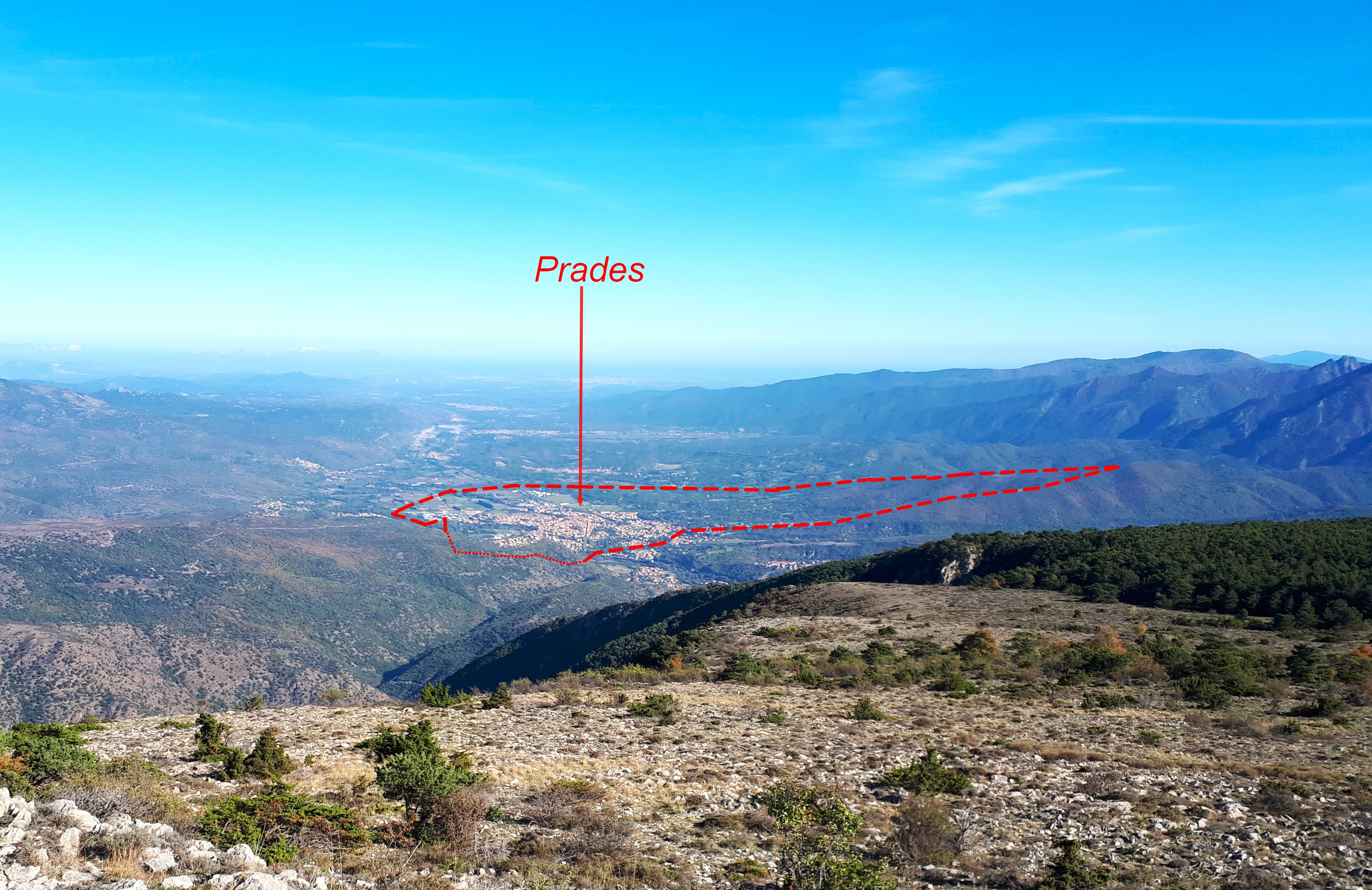
Prades commune, seen from the west. The dashed red line indicates the approximate extent of the commune.

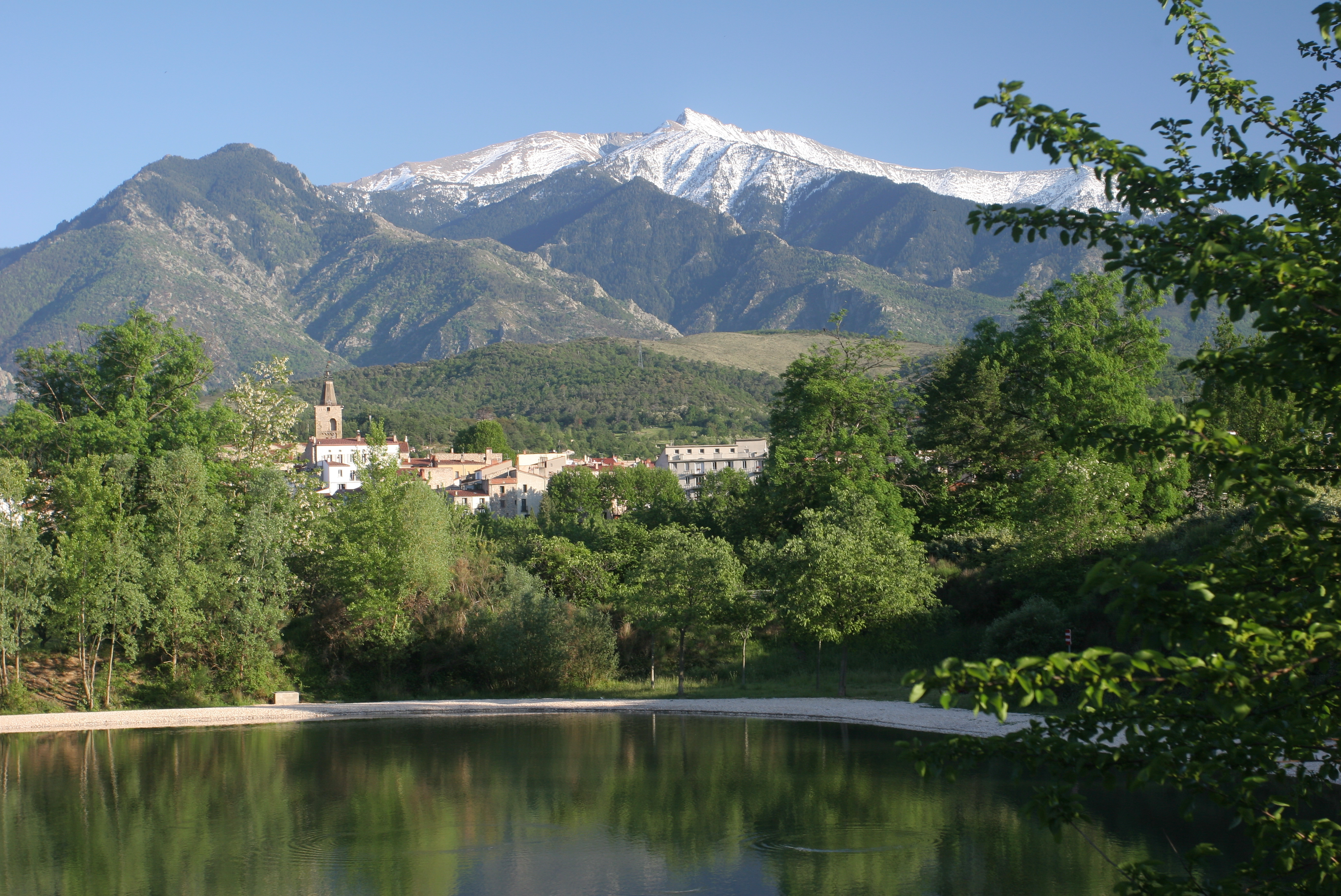
View from Prades southwards towards Canigó mountain (a Neogene horst of pre-Cambrian metasediments and Palaeozoic igneous formations).

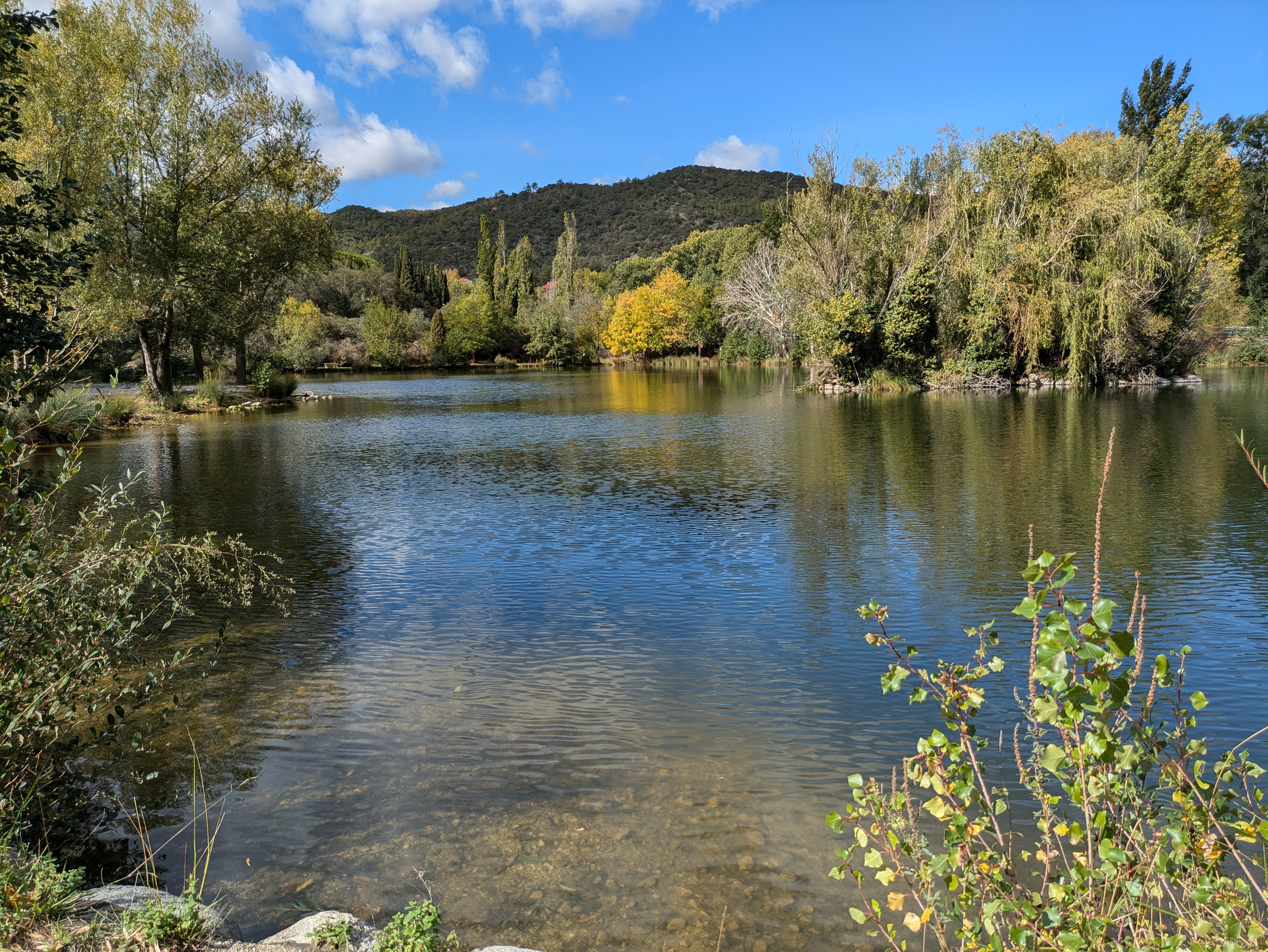
Recreational lake in Prades near the Têt river. The hills beyond, which are to the north of the town, are mostly in lower Palaeozoic schist.

Canigó mountain to the south of Prades, and the hills to the north of the town, are on quite different geological formations. They are separated by the Têt fault (a major normal fault of Neogene age), and by a zone of younger (Miocene and Quaternary) sediments (those sediments in fact covering the greater part of Prades commune). The Têt fault has broadly determined the course of the river Têt along much of its length, including the section of the river through the commune.

== Politics and administration ==
=== Mayors ===
Mayor	Term start	Term end
Jean-François Denis	2001	2008
Jean Castex	2008	2015

=== Twin towns ===
Prades is twinned with:

- Ripoll, Catalonia, Spain
- Lousã, Portugal
- Kitzingen, Germany

== Population and society ==
=== Demography ===
Historical population
Year	Pop.	±% p.a.
1968	5,937	—
1975	6,448	+1.19%
1982	6,100	−0.79%
1990	6,009	−0.19%
1999	5,800	−0.39%
2007	6,356	+1.15%
2012	5,851	−1.64%
2017	6,124	+0.92%
2023	6,148	+0.07%
Source: INSEE

=== Events ===
The Prades Festival, which specialises in chamber music, was begun in 1950, when eminent musicians were invited to play with Casals to commemorate the bicentenary of the death of Johann Sebastian Bach. This followed a decade during which Casals had declined to play in public because of events in Spain. From the first festival, recordings of performances at Prades were released on the Columbia record label.

The festival moved to Perpignan in 1951, but returned to Prades the following year. It was renamed the Pablo Casals Festival in 1982.

Universitat Catalana d'Estiu

Every summer, since 1968, the Universitat Catalana d'Estiu (Catalan Summer University) is held at Prada de Conflent. It is an academic event which usually lasts ten days, open to everybody, where scholars, artists, and other personalities coming from all over the Catalan Countries lecture and discuss about a variety of topics of general interest.

== Notable people ==
- Wilfred the Hairy (died 13 August 897), 9th-century Count of Urgell, Cerdanya, Barcelona, Girona, Besalú and Ausona – born in Prades
- Francés de Corteta, nobleman and poet
- Pierre Nicolas Camille Jacquelin du Val (1828–1862), entomologist – born in Prades
- Thomas Merton (1915–1968), trappist monk – born in Prades

Prades was also the adopted home of cellist Pablo Casals and grammarian Pompeu Fabra during their exile from the Spanish Civil War. A small museum in Prades commemorates Casals.

== See also ==
- Communes of the Pyrénées-Orientales department
