= Ramon d'Abadal i de Vinyals =

Catalan historian, politician and journalist (1888–1970)

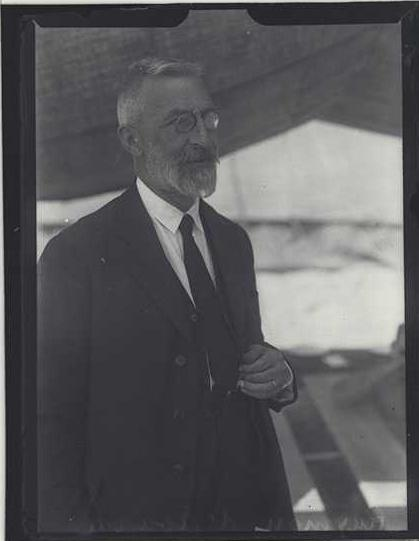
- Born: 1888; Vic
- Died: 1970 (aged 81–82); Barcelona

Academic background
- Education: University of Barcelona

Ramon d'Abadal i de Vinyals (1888–1970) was a Catalan historian, politician, and journalist.

== Life ==
Abadal i de Vinyals was born in Vic. He graduated in law at the University of Barcelona in 1910. He also completed studies in history in both Barcelona and in several French centers. Towards 1909-10 he was affiliated with Joventut Nacionalista, the youth wing of la Lliga Regionalista (the Regionalist League).

Shortly thereafter his political career began, which included terms as the provincial member of parliament for Vic (1917 and 1921).

In the Commonwealth of Catalonia, he worked at numerous commissions – including that of the Biblioteca de Catalunya (Library of Catalonia) - and he was a vice-president of the Board of Education.

He was a promoter of Accio Catalana, which he left when the Republic was founded, returning to la Lliga. He was the director of the newspaper La Publicitat when it was ‘catalanized’ (1922), and also the effective director of La Veu de Catalunya (1933–36).

He was also one of the founders of the newspaper L'Instant (The Instant) (1935).

In 1936, he moved to Italy, and in 1939 he returned to Catalonia, dedicating himself to the study of history, with special attention to the period of the Catalan counts and its antecedents.

He died in 1970 in Barcelona.

== Work ==
Aside from his early work in the history of law (in 1913 he co-edited with Ferran Valls i Taberner the Usatges de Barcelona (the Usages of Barcelona), notable are some of his main historical works subsequent to 1939: L’abat Oliba, bisbe de Vic, i la seva època (The Abbot Oliba, bishop of Vic, and his Times (1948); Com neix i com creix un gran monestir pirinenc abans de l'any mil: Eixalada-Cuixà ( a 1955 book with research on the Monastery of Saint-André d'Eixalada); Els primers comtes catalans (The first Catalan Counts (1958); Els precedents antics a la historia de Catalunya (The ancient foundations of Catalonia’s history, 1967); Dels visigots als catalans (from the Visigoths to the Catalans, 1969, 1970); and, especially, the many volumes of Catalunya carolingia (Carolingian Catalonia, 1926–52, 1955, 1971).
