= Canigó =

Mountain in the Pyrenees of southern France

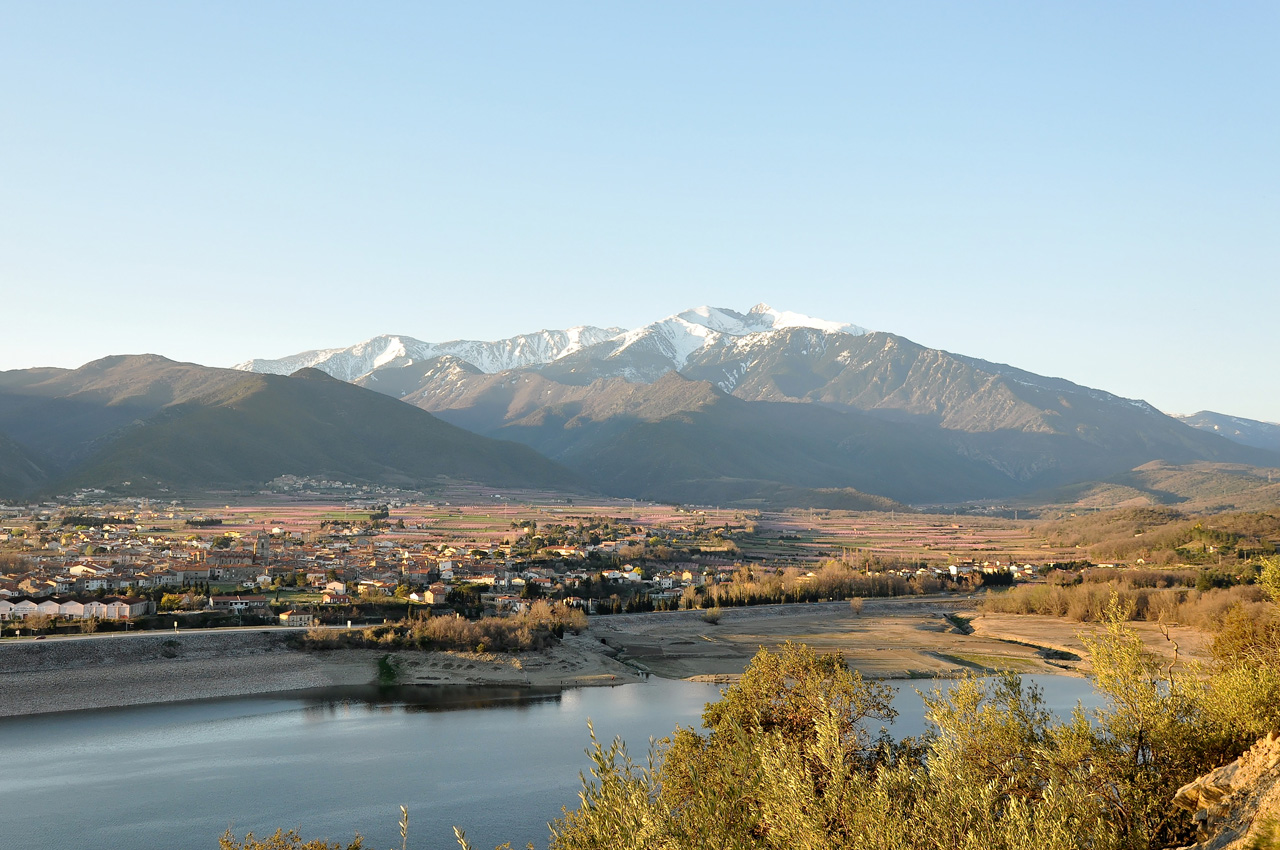
- Canigó, 2009

Highest point
- Elevation: 2,784.70 m (9,136.2 ft)
- Prominence: 550 m (1,800 ft)
- Listing: Mountains of France
- Coordinates: 42°31′08″N 02°27′24″E

Geography
- Location within Pyrenees
- Location: Pyrénées-Orientales, France
- Parent range: Pyrenees

Climbing
- First ascent: According to tradition, in 1285 by Peter III of Aragon
- Easiest route: hike

The Canigó (Catalan: Canigó [kəniˈɣo], locally [kəniˈɣu]; French: Canigou [kaniɡu]; Latin: mons Canigosus or Canigonis) is a mountain located in the Pyrenees of southern France.

The Canigó is located less than 50 kilometres (31 mi) from the sea and has an elevation of 2,784.70 metres (9,136.2 ft). Due to its sharp flanks and its dramatic location near the coast, until the 18th century the Canigó was believed to be the highest mountain in the Pyrenees.

Being in Northern Catalonia and visible in Southern Catalonia, the mountain has a historical symbolical significance for Catalan people.

== Geography ==
The Canigó is located in Pyrénées-Orientales, south of Prades and north of Prats-de-Mollo-la-Preste. Its summit lies on the border between two communes: Vernet-les-Bains and Taurinya (although the territories of two other communes - Casteil and Valmanya - approach quite closely to the summit). Its location makes it visible from the plains of Roussillon and from Conflent in France, and as well from Empordà in Spain.

Twice a year, in early February and at the end of October, with good weather, the Canigó can be seen at sunset from as far as Marseille, 250 km (160 mi) away, by refraction of light. This phenomenon was observed in 1808 by baron Franz Xaver von Zach from the Notre-Dame de la Garde basilica in Marseille. All year long, it can also be seen, with good weather, from Agde, Port-Camargue and the Montagne Noire.

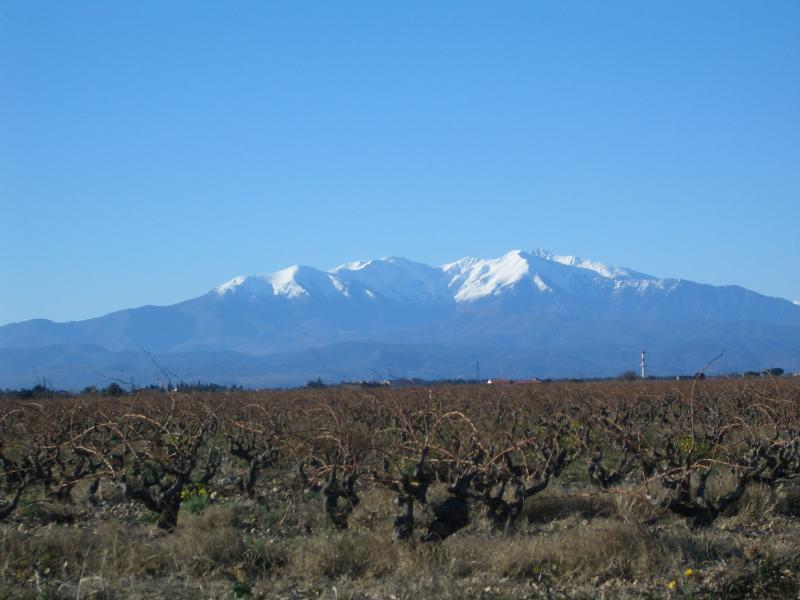
Canigó, 2004

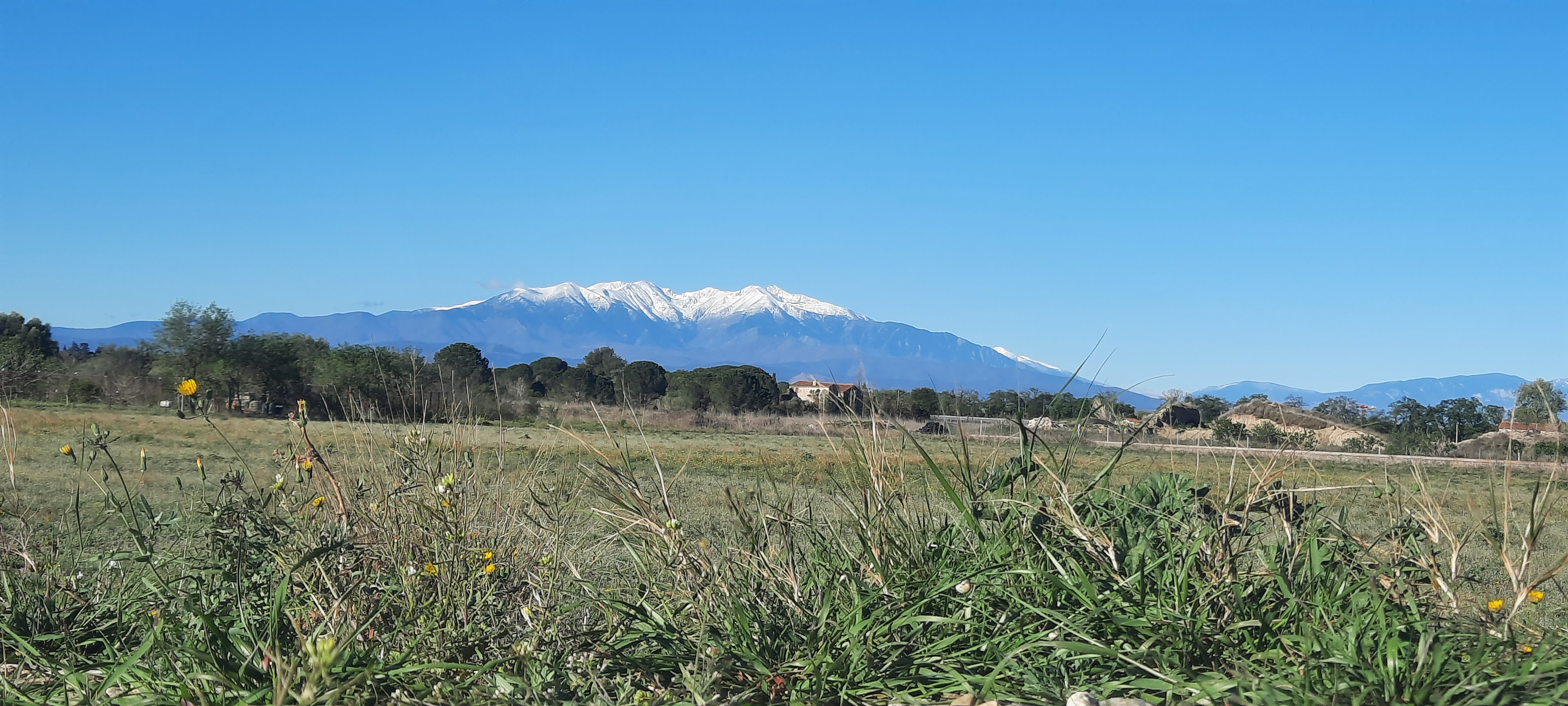
Canigó from Bompas, Perpignan, 1 April 2024

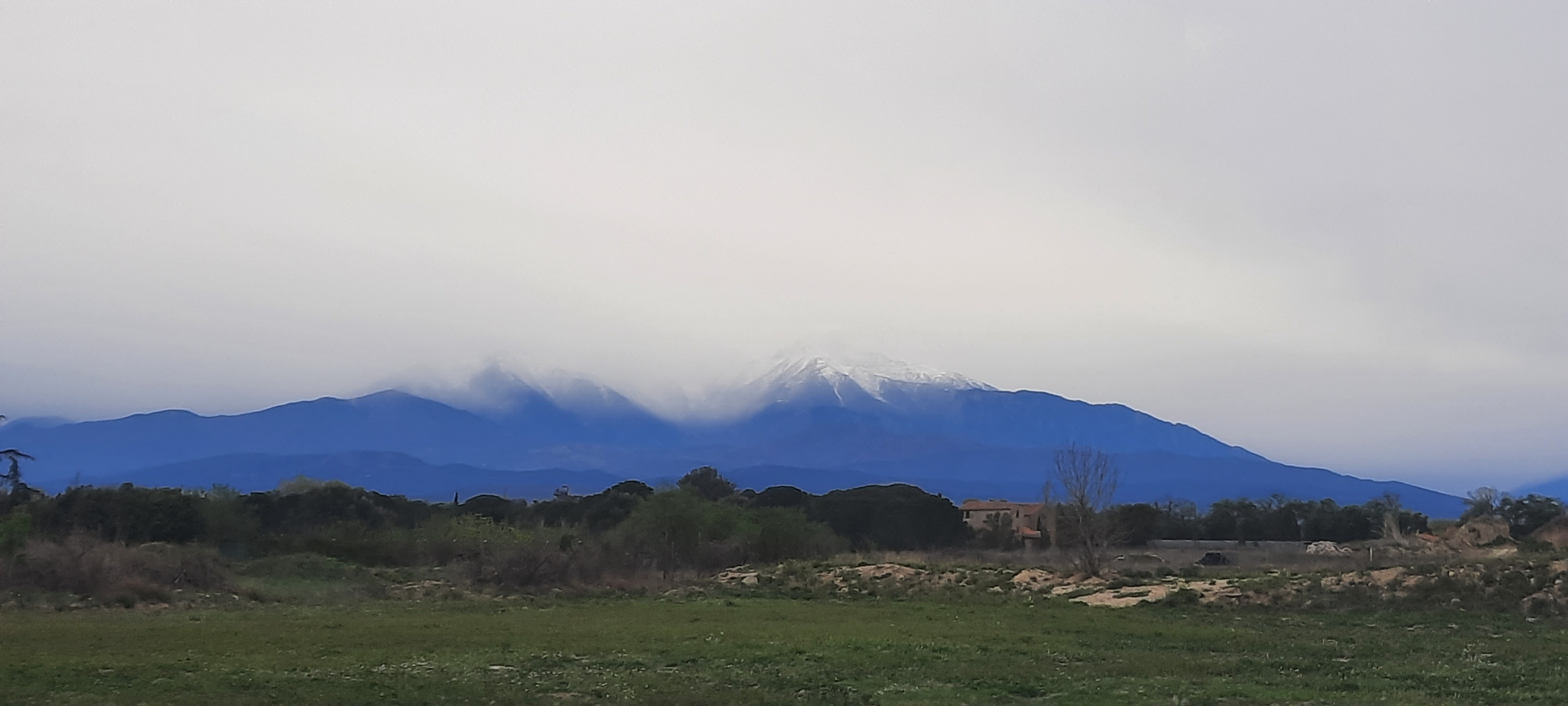
Canigó from Bompas, Perpignan 31 March 2024

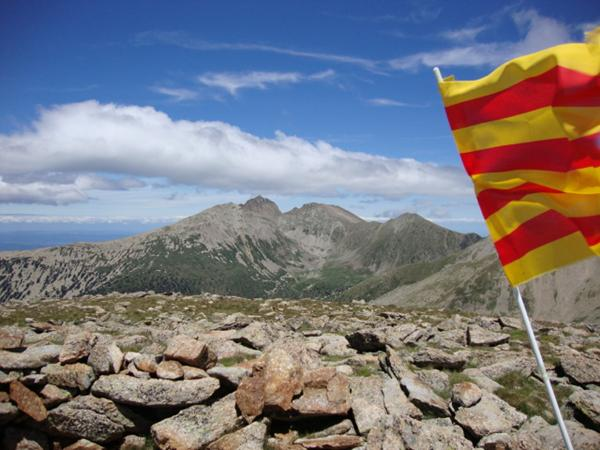
View from the Pic dels Set Homes

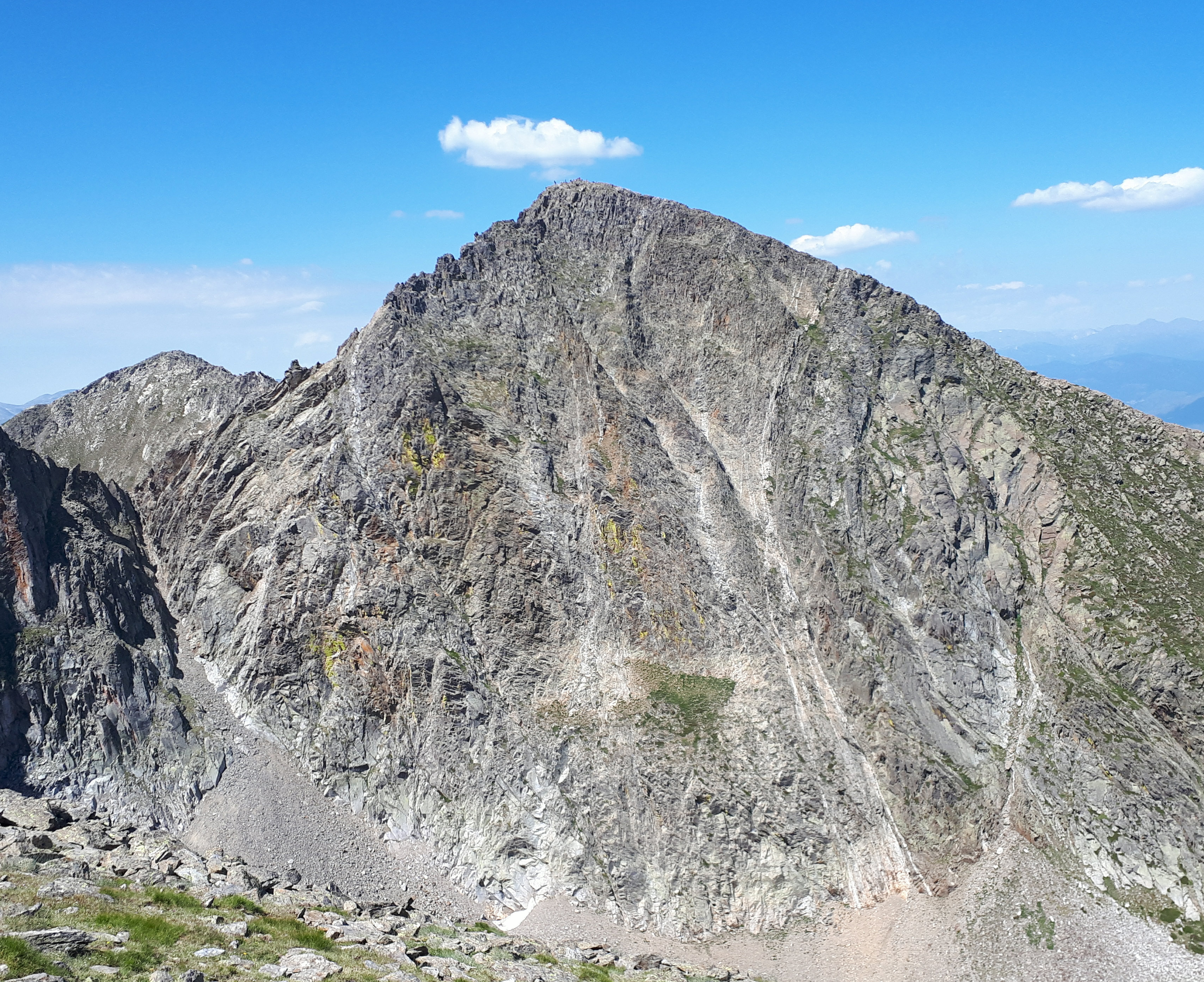
The east face of the Pic du Canigó

The Canigó massif is good example of a geological horst (a raised block bounded by normal faults). Its steep north-west, fault-bounded face is especially striking.

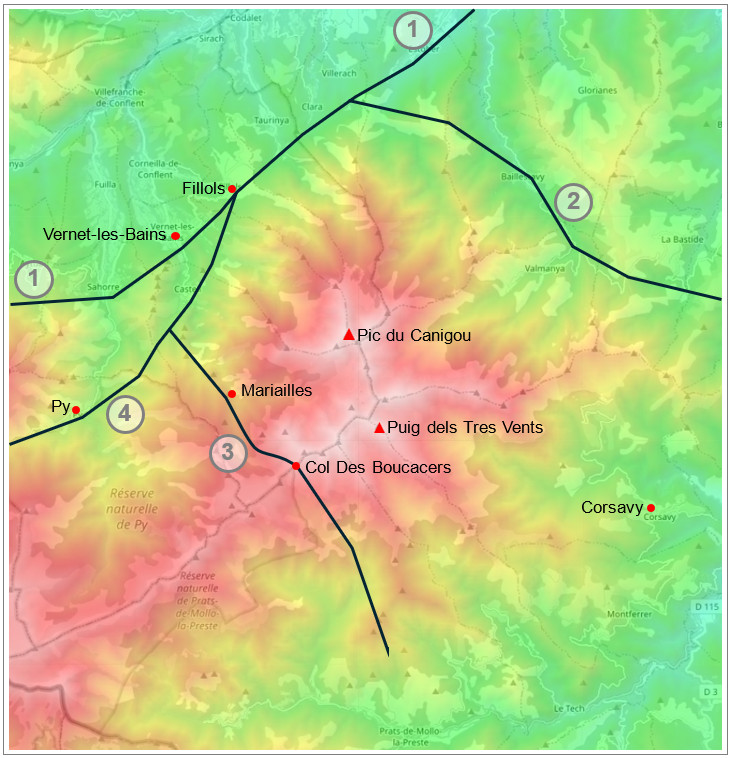
Normal faults around the Canigó massif. 1 - Têt; 2 - Aspres; 3 - Mariailles; 4 - Fillols-Py.

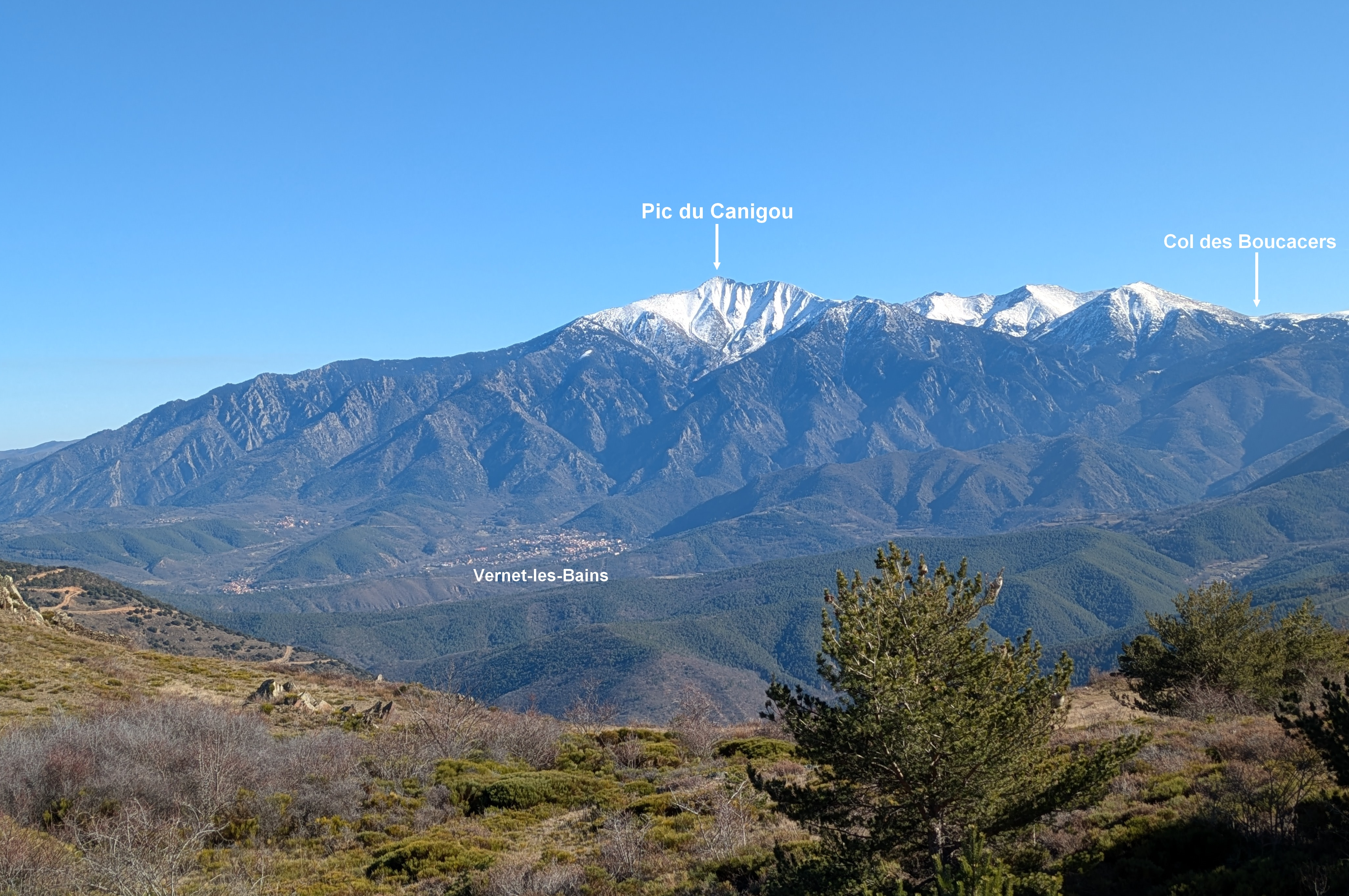
The Canigó massif seen from the north-west.

== Trekking and sightseeing ==
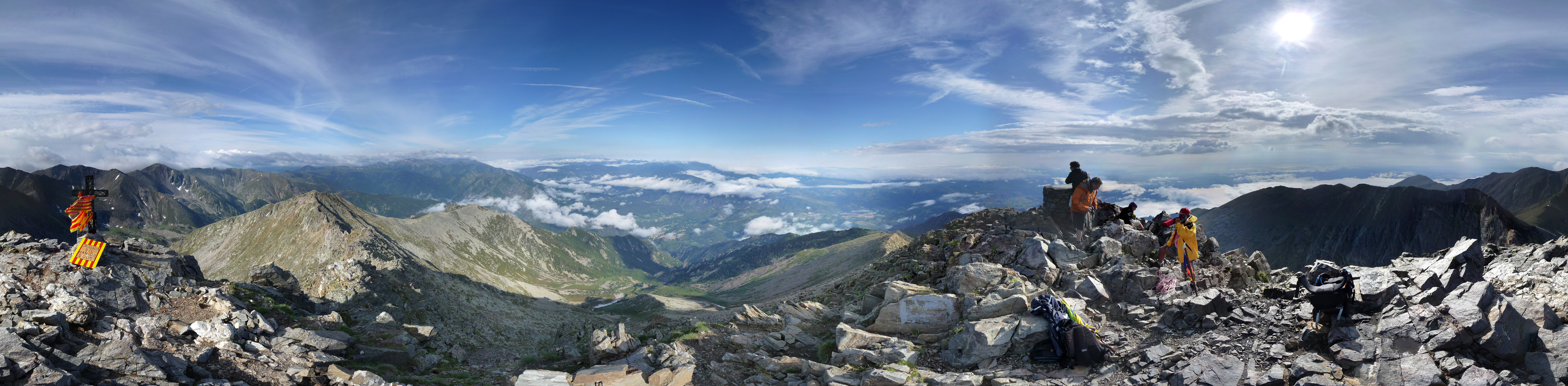
View from the summit

Jeep tracks on the north side of the massif lead to the Chalet des Cortalets (at 2150 m) which is a popular outpost with walkers.

There are two ancient monasteries at the foot of the mountain, Martin-du-Canigou and Saint-Michel-de-Cuxa.

== Canigó Flame ==
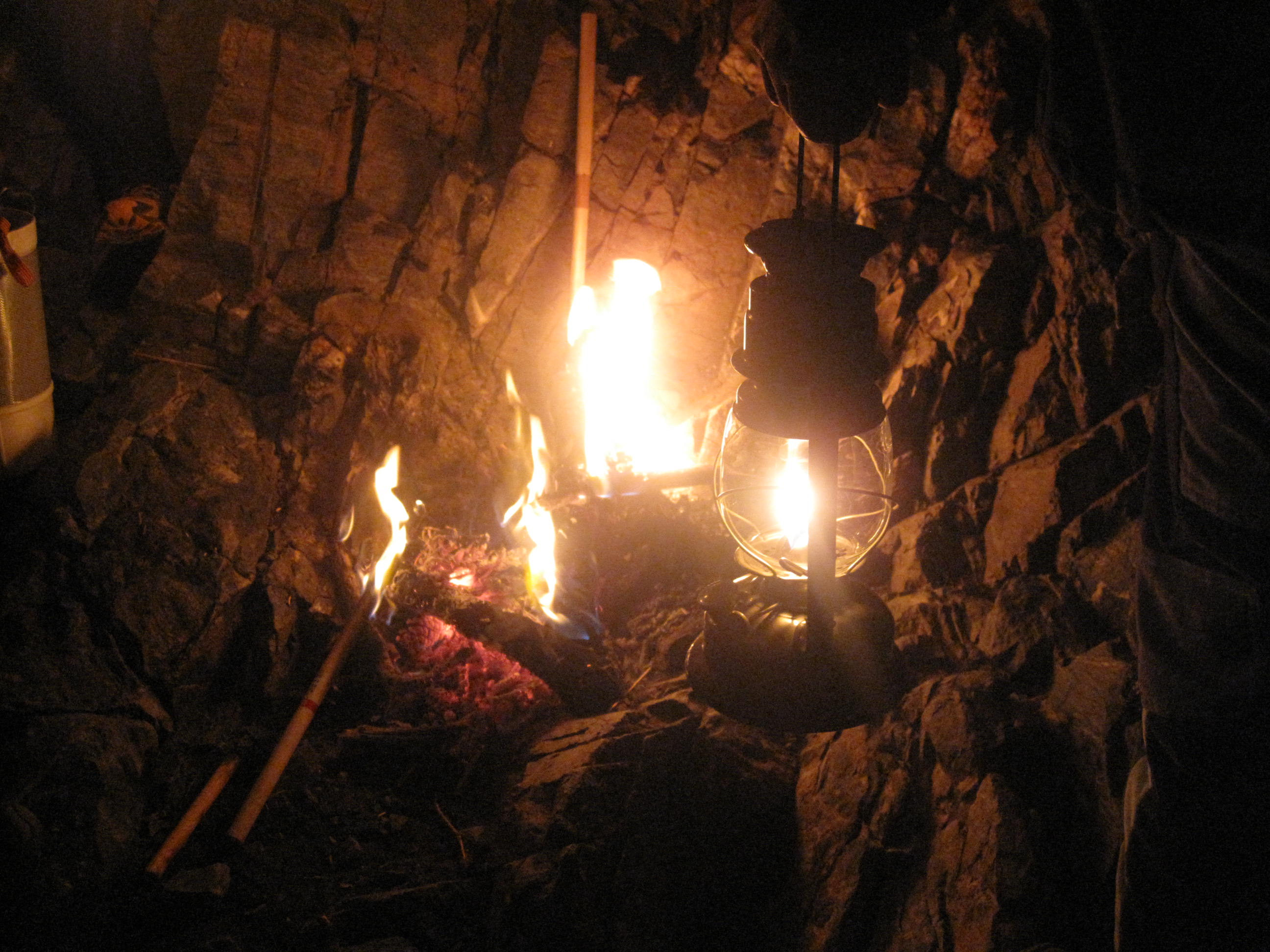
The Flame being lit at the top of Canigó

The mountain has symbolical significance for Catalan people. On its summit stands a cross that is often decorated with the Catalan flag. Every year on 23 June, the night before St. John's day (nit de Sant Joan), there is a ceremony called Flama del Canigó. French Catalans carry a flaming torch from Perpignan to the cross and the Catalonian flag on top of the mountain, and people light bonfires throughout the area.

== Literature ==
The Canigó inspired the epic poem "Canigó" by Catalan poet Jacint Verdaguer i Santaló. In these verses Verdaguer compares the snowy mountain to a Magnolia flower (pages 27–28):

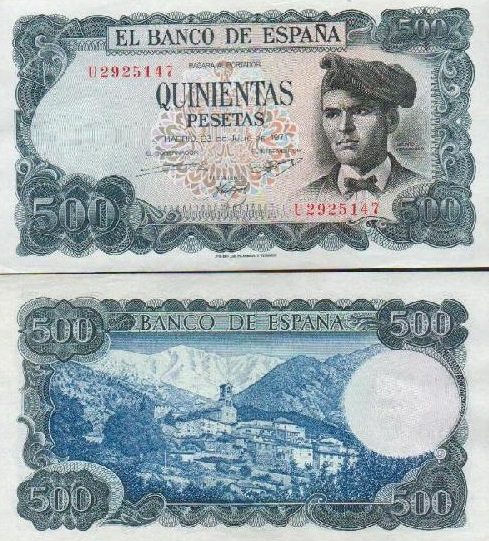
This Spanish banknote of 1971 had a portrait of Verdaguer on one side, and a picture of Canigó, from Vernet-les-Bains (in France), on the other.

Lo Canigó és una magnòlia immensa
que en un rebrot del Pirineu se bada;
per abelles té fades que la volten,
per papallons los cisnes i les àligues.
Formen son càlzer escarides serres
que plateja l'hivern i l'estiu daura,
grandiós beire on beu olors l'estrella,
los aires rellentor, los núvols aigua.
Les boscúries de pins són sos bardissos,
los Estanyols ses gotes de rosada,
i és son pistil aqueix palau aurífic,
somni d'aloja que del cel davalla.

Translation:

The Canigó is an immense magnolia
that blooms in an offshoot of the Pyrenees;
its bees are the fairies that surround it,
and its butterflies the swans and the eagles.
Its cup are jagged mountain chains,
colored in silver by the winter and in gold by the summer,
huge cup where the star drinks fragrances,
the airs freshness and the clouds water.
The pine forests are its hedges
and the ponds its dew drops,
and its pistil is that golden palace,
seen by the nymph in her dreams descending from heaven.

While he was staying in Vernet-les-Bains in 1911, Kipling wrote about Canigou. In a letter to the Club Alpin, he praised it as a "magician among mountains".

Kipling also wrote a light-hearted short story entitled Why Snow Falls at Vernet. It makes fun of the English habit of always talking about the weather.

== See also ==
- Prieuré de Serrabone
- St-Martin-du-Canigou monastery
- Vernet-les-Bains
