= Abbey of Saint-Michel-de-Cuxa =

Abbey in Pyrénées-Orientales, France

Coordinates: 42°35′42″N 02°25′00″E

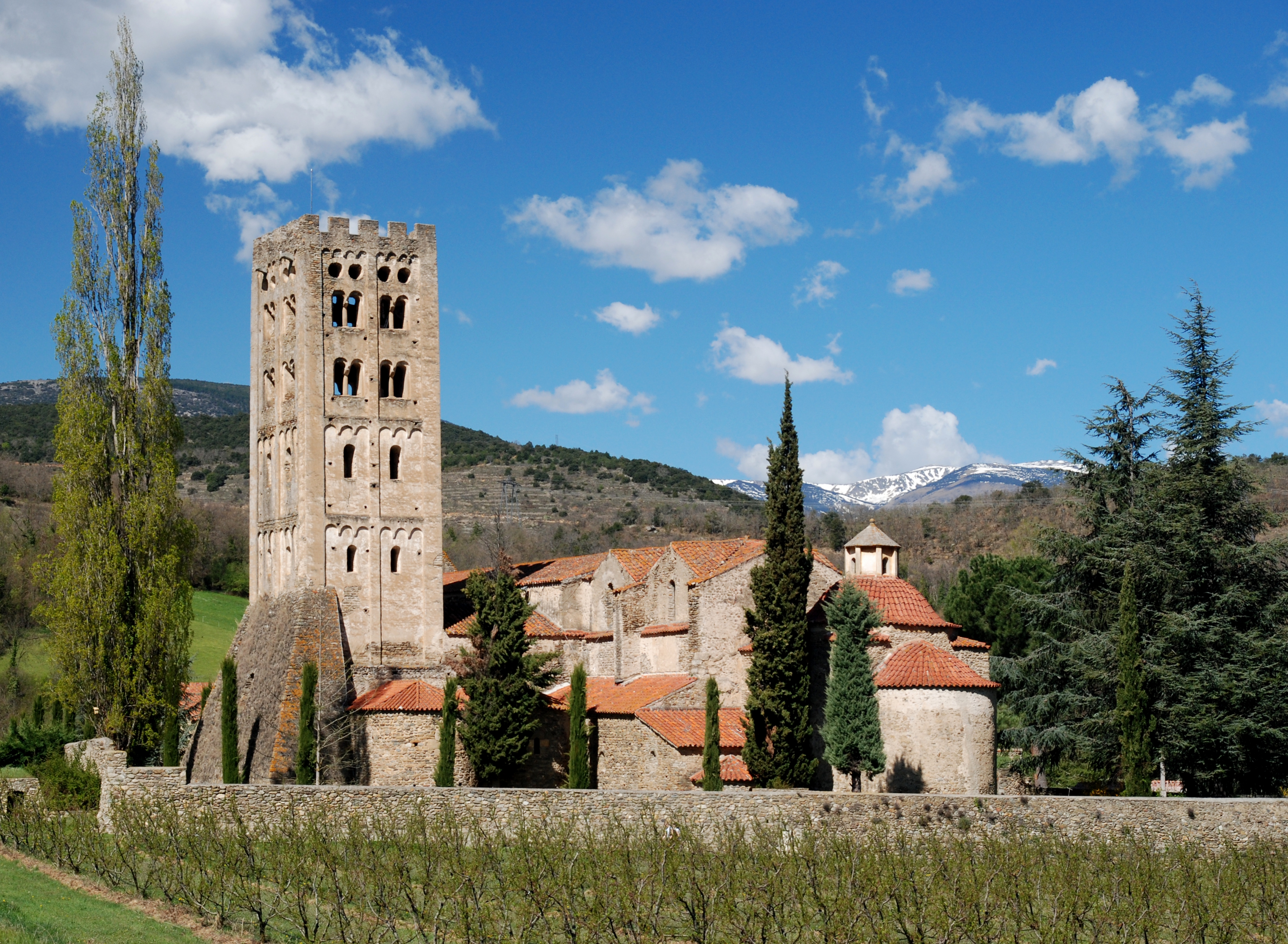
Abbey of Saint-Michel-de-Cuxa

The abbey of Saint-Michel-de-Cuxa (Catalan: Sant Miquel de Cuixà) is a Benedictine abbey located in the territory of the commune of Codalet, in the Pyrénées-Orientales département, in southwestern France. It was founded initially in 840, and then refounded at its present site in 878, after a flood destroyed the original buildings. It was an important cultural centre in the regency of Abbot Oliba.

Parts of what was once building material from the 12th century abbey now partially make up The Cloisters museum in New York City.

== Foundation and apogee of the abbey ==
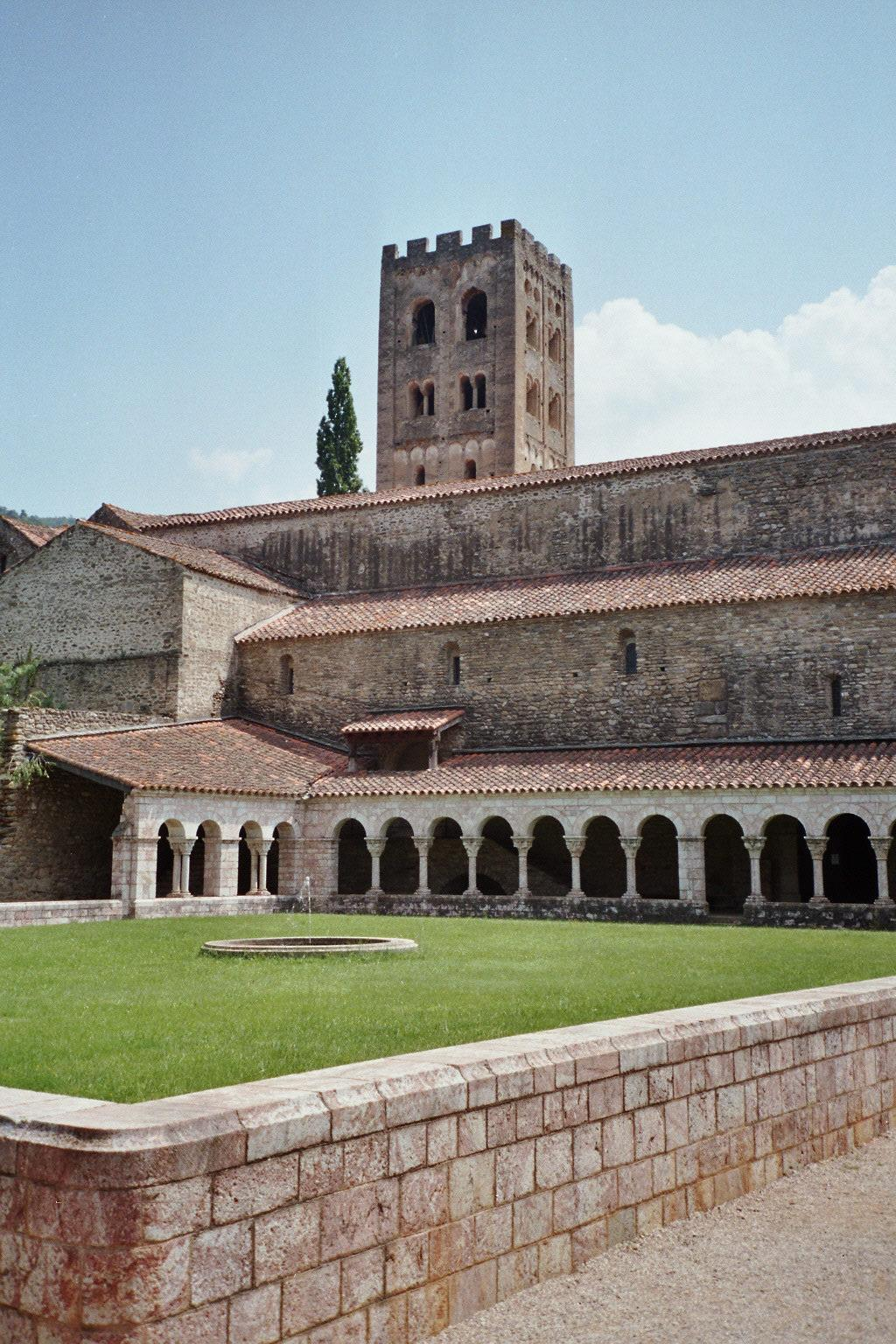
Cloister

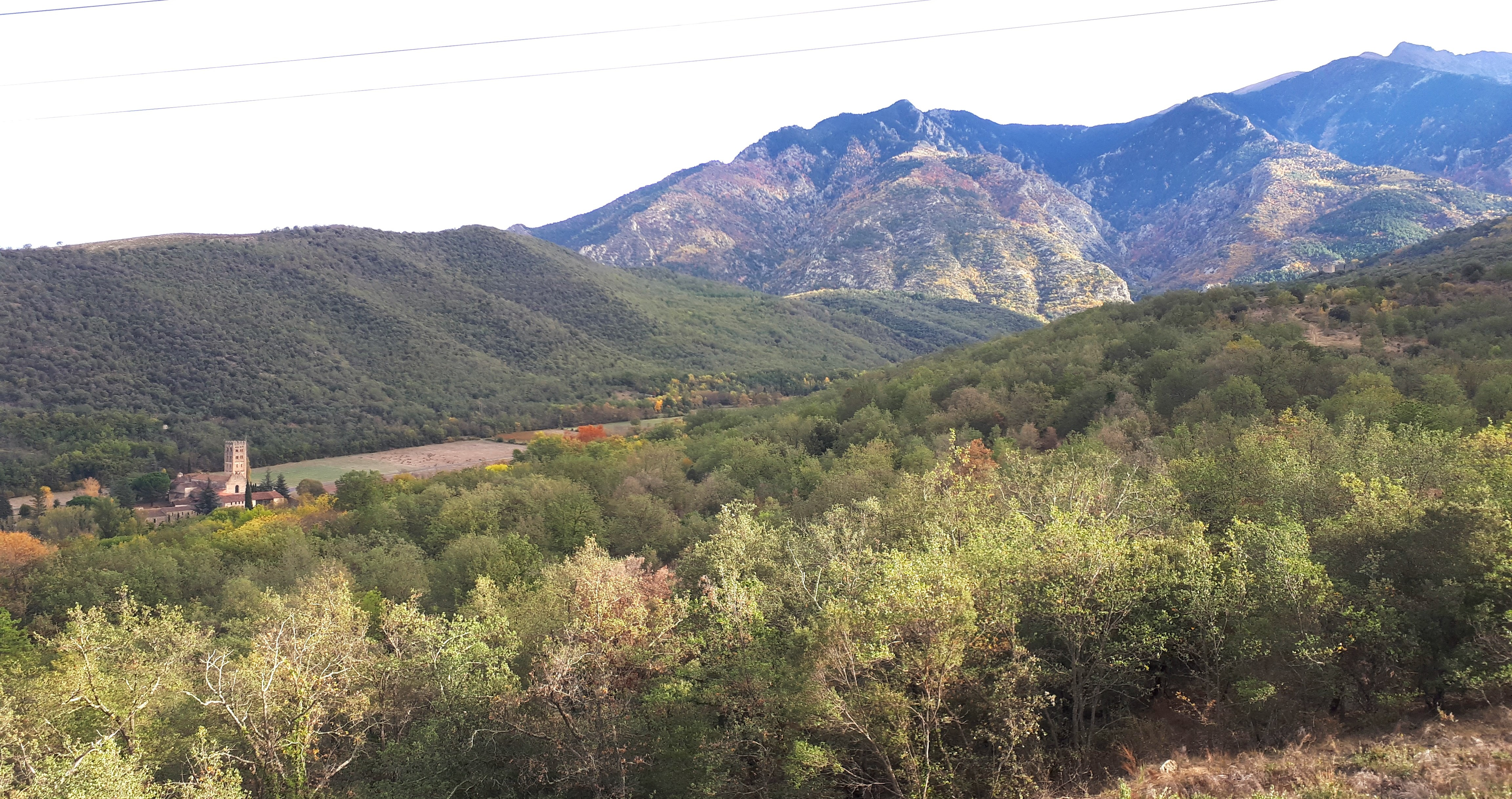
The abbey is situated at the foot of the northern side of the Canigó massif.

The origins of Cuixà abbey lie at Sant Andreu d'Eixalada, an abbey founded by the Benedictines in about 840, and located at the head of the Tet valley. In the autumn of 878, the river broke its banks, flooding and destroying the monastery (located near the river-bed) and causing a likely death toll of at least 12. The remainder of the monks were forced to seek shelter in the surrounding countryside. The community then transferred to its present site at Cuixà, a minor cenobitic community dedicated to Saint Germanus, led by Father Protais.

In June 879, Protasius and Miro the Elder, count of Conflent and Roussillon, signed the founding treaty of the new monastery, whereby Cuixà extended its properties with those contributed by Eixalada and Protasius was named abbot.

The abbey continued under the protection of the count of Cerdanya and Conflent. The territory then came under the domain of the family of Wilfred I, count of Barcelona in 870. In about 940, under the initiative of Sunifred II of Cerdanya, a new church dedicated to Saint Michael was built. In 956 the building was refurbished and made more sumptuous; the main altar was consecrated on 30 September 974 by Garí, a monk from Cluny who led five southern monasteries.

When the Doge of Venice, Pietro I Orseolo, accepted Romuald's advice to become a monk, he abdicated and fled in the night to Saint-Michel-de-Cuxa accompanied by Romuald and his companion, Marinus, who established a hermitage nearby.

Cesare Borgia probably never came to the abbey, although he was named by his father abbot of Saint-Michel-de-Cuxa in 1494, one among many other revenue-earning titles, which he kept until 1498.

The abbey was initially part of the territory of the County of Barcelona, then of the Kingdom of Majorca and the Principality of Catalonia within the Crown of Aragon. After the dynastic union of the Crown of Aragon and the Crown of Castile, all of the lands contained therein became part of Habsburg Spain. During the Reapers' War or Catalan Revolt against Philip IV of Spain, the Catalan Republic (1641) asked for the protection of the King of France Louis XIII, who became Count of Barcelona. At the end of the Thirty Years' War, Philip IV of Spain and Louis XIII of France signed the 1659 Treaty of the Pyrenees whereby Northern Catalonia was annexed to the Kingdom of France, while the rest of Catalonia came back under Spanish rule. The abbey was nationalized along with other ecclesiastical properties during the French Revolution of 1789, and subsequently sold, with the clergy evicted. Subsequently, the buildings fell into disrepair.

Some sculpture from the abbey found its way into a collection of George Grey Barnard (1863–1938), a prominent American sculptor, and an avid collector and dealer of medieval art. In 1914, Barnard opened his "Cloisters" exhibit on Fort Washington Avenue, New York, along with sculpture from a number of medieval sites. The Cloisters was rebuilt and expanded by John D. Rockefeller Jr. in 1938 at Fort Tryon Park, Upper Manhattan and is now a significant Medieval museum within the Metropolitan Museum of Art. The centerpiece and namesake of the museum is a cloister built using fragments of the 12th century cloister of Saint-Michel-de-Cuxa.

The Cuxa abbey was refounded in 1919 and subsequently restored under the Cistercians, an order which originated as an offshoot of the Benedictines. The abbey was transferred back to the Benedictines in 1965.

== Music festival ==
The abbey is one of the venues used by the Pablo Casals Festival, which was founded in 1950. Pablo Casals was filmed in the abbey in 1954 as he performed Bach's Suite No. 1 in G Major.

== See also ==
- French Romanesque architecture
