= Canaveilles =

Canaveilles Canavelles
- Commune
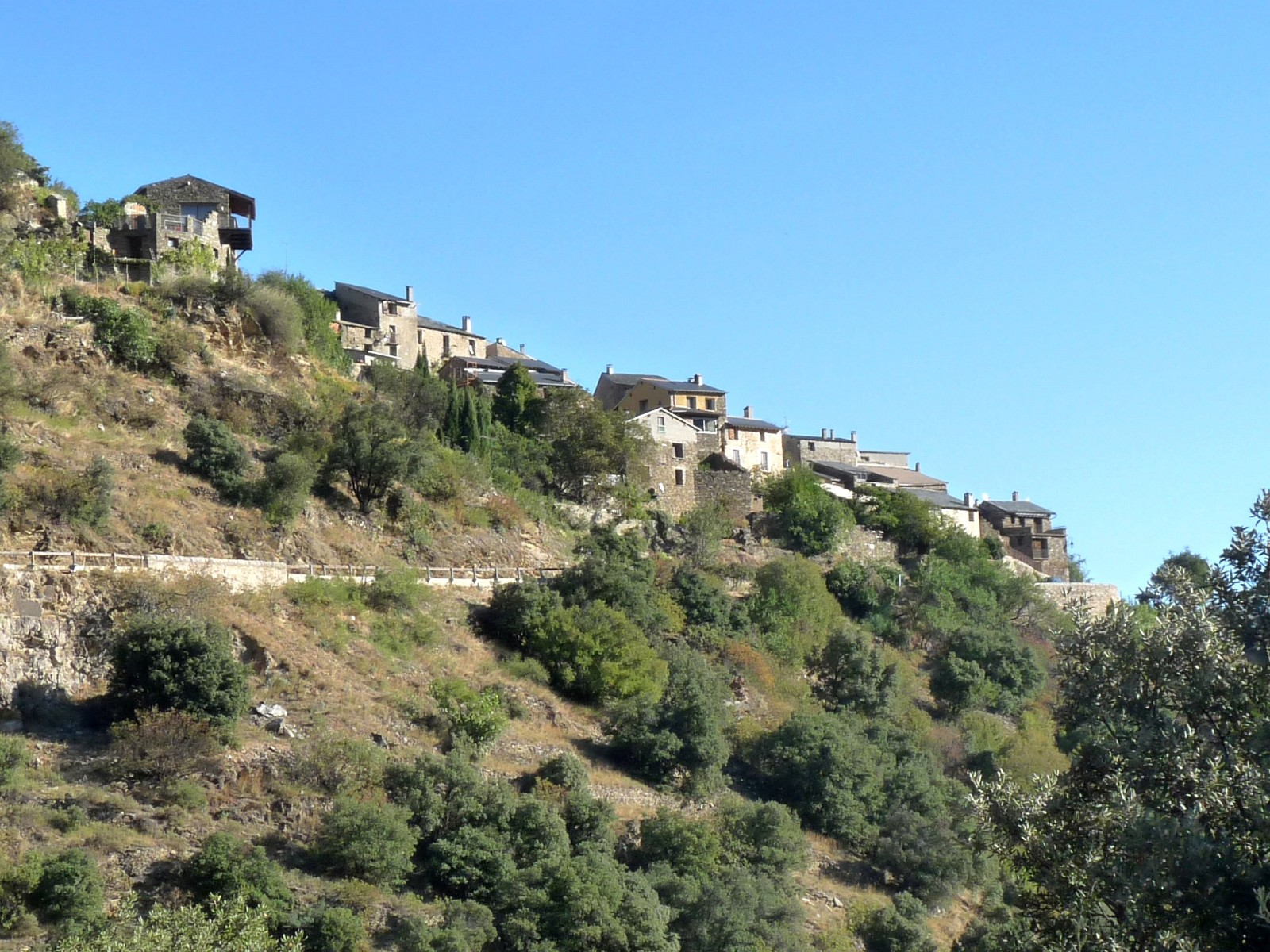
- A general view of Canaveilles
- Location of Canaveilles
- Location within France Location within Occitanie
- Coordinates: 42°32′13″N 2°15′02″E
- Country: France
- Region: Occitania
- Department: Pyrénées-Orientales
- Arrondissement: Prades
- Canton: Les Pyrénées catalanes
- Intercommunality: Conflent-Canigó

Government
  - Mayor (2020–2026): Sébastien Nens
- Area^{1}: 10.95 km^{2} (4.23 sq mi)
- Elevation: 932 m (3,058 ft)
- Highest elevation: 1,984 m (6,509 ft)
- Lowest elevation: 657 m (2,156 ft)
- Population (2023): 53
  - Density: 4.8/km^{2} (13/sq mi)
- Time zone: UTC+01:00 (CET)
  - Summer (DST): UTC+02:00 (CEST)
- INSEE/Postal code: 66036 /66360
- ^{1} French Land Register data, which excludes lakes, ponds, glaciers > 1 km^{2} (0.386 sq mi or 247 acres) and river estuaries.

Canaveilles (French pronunciation: [kanavɛj]; Catalan: Canavelles) is a commune in the Pyrénées-Orientales department in southern France.

== Geography ==
Canaveilles is located in the canton of Les Pyrénées catalanes and in the arrondissement of Prades. Olette-Canaveilles-les-Bains station has rail connections to Villefranche-de-Conflent and Latour-de-Carol.

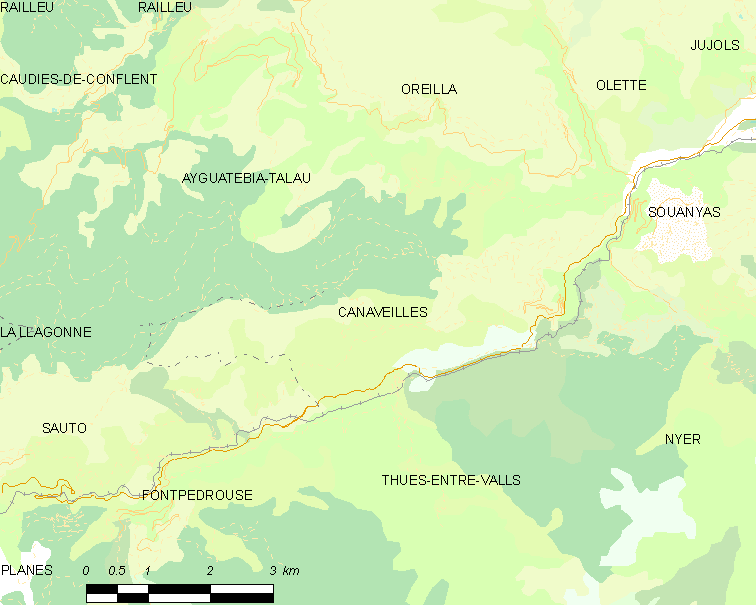
Map of Canaveilles and its surrounding communes

== Population ==
Historical population
Year	Pop.	±% p.a.
1968	27	—
1975	40	+5.78%
1982	50	+3.24%
1990	73	+4.84%
1999	58	−2.52%
2007	49	−2.09%
2012	48	−0.41%
2017	26	−11.54%
2023	53	+12.60%
Source: INSEE

== See also ==
- Communes of the Pyrénées-Orientales department
