= Souanyas =

Souanyas Soanyes
- Commune
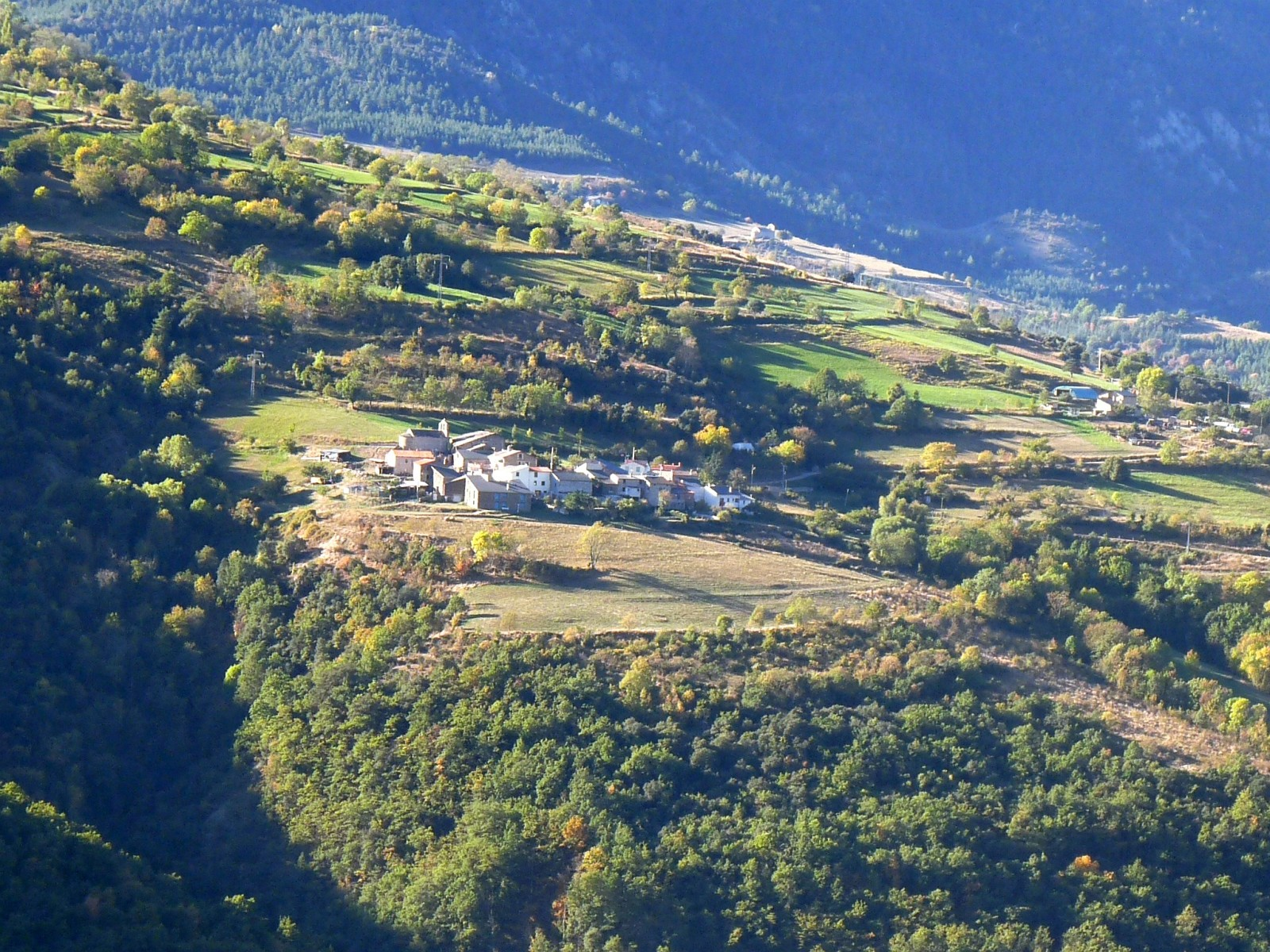
- A general view of Souanyas
- Location of Souanyas
- Location within France Location within Occitanie
- Coordinates: 42°33′02″N 2°16′47″E
- Country: France
- Region: Occitania
- Department: Pyrénées-Orientales
- Arrondissement: Prades
- Canton: Les Pyrénées catalanes

Government
  - Mayor (2020–2026): Guy Bobe
- Area^{1}: 4.81 km^{2} (1.86 sq mi)
- Elevation: 810 m (2,660 ft)
- Highest elevation: 1,103 m (3,619 ft)
- Lowest elevation: 580 m (1,900 ft)
- Population (2023): 29
  - Density: 6.0/km^{2} (16/sq mi)
- Time zone: UTC+01:00 (CET)
  - Summer (DST): UTC+02:00 (CEST)
- INSEE/Postal code: 66197 /66360
- ^{1} French Land Register data, which excludes lakes, ponds, glaciers > 1 km^{2} (0.386 sq mi or 247 acres) and river estuaries.

Souanyas (French pronunciation: [swaɲas]; Catalan: Soanyes) is a commune in the Pyrénées-Orientales department in southern France.

== Geography ==
Souanyas is located in the canton of Les Pyrénées catalanes and in the arrondissement of Prades.

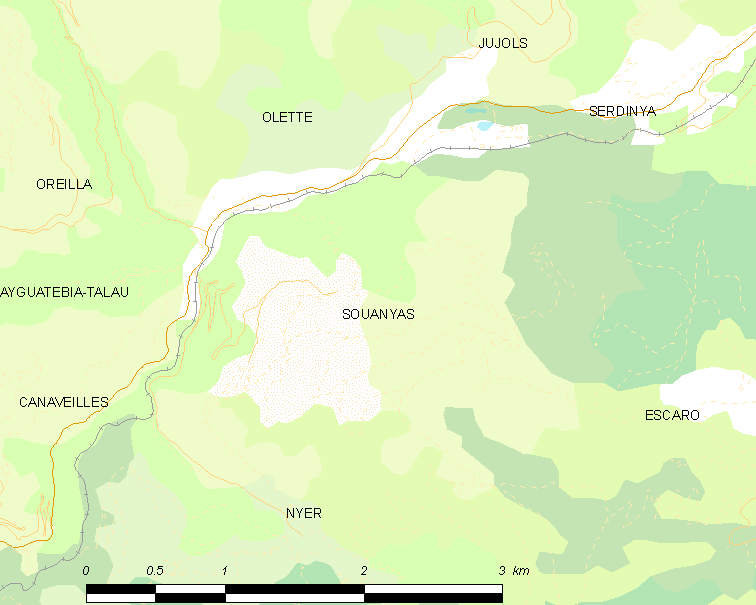
Map of Souanyas and its surrounding communes

== Population ==
Historical population
Year	Pop.	±% p.a.
1968	63	—
1975	47	−4.10%
1982	41	−1.93%
1990	45	+1.17%
1999	27	−5.52%
2007	36	+3.66%
2012	44	+4.10%
2017	37	−3.41%
2023	29	−3.98%
Source: INSEE

== See also ==
- Communes of the Pyrénées-Orientales department
