= Taurinya =

Taurinya Taurinyà
- Commune
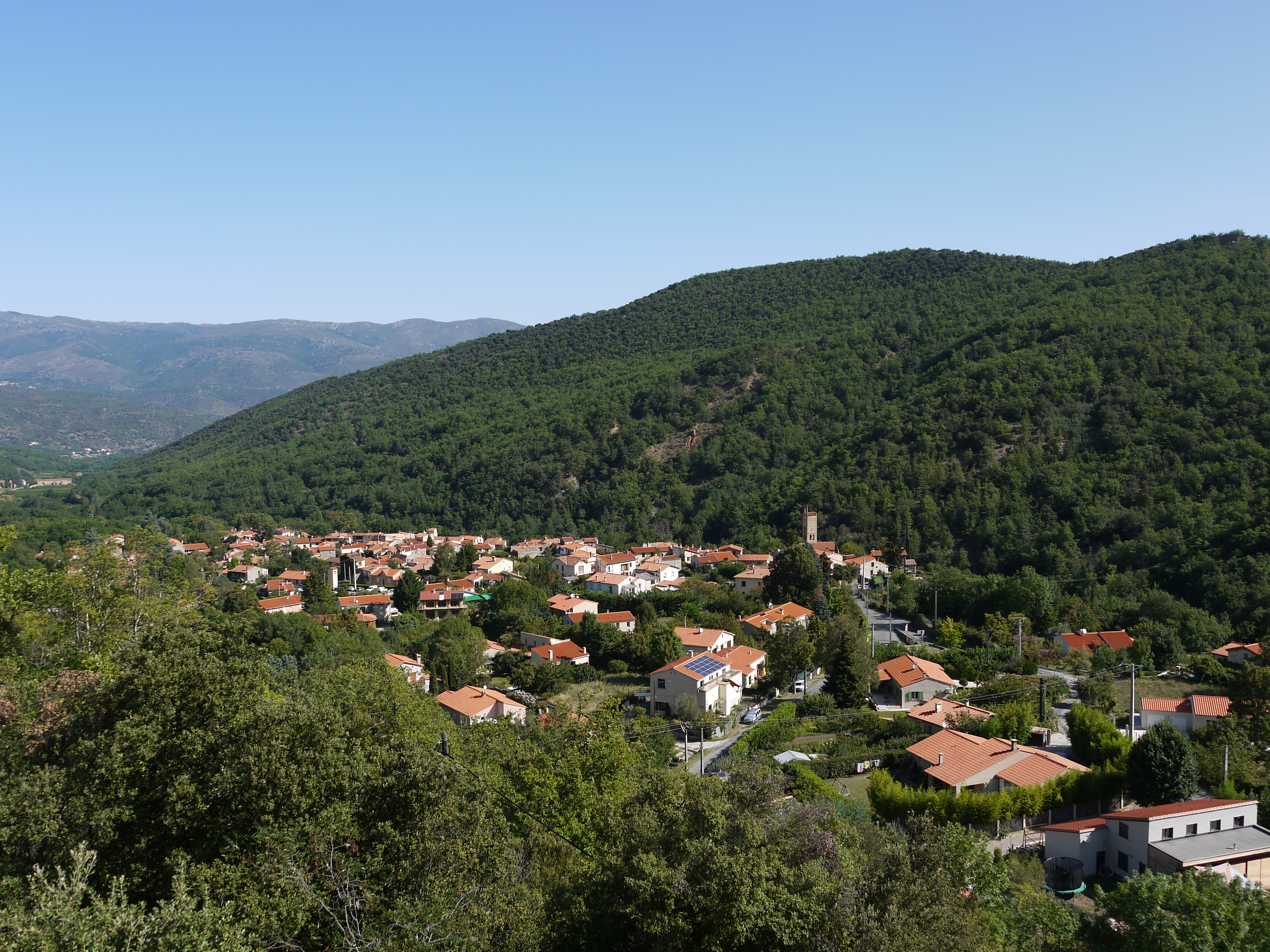
- A general view of Taurinya

- Coat of arms
- Location of Taurinya
- Location within France Location within Occitanie
- Coordinates: 42°34′52″N 2°25′38″E
- Country: France
- Region: Occitania
- Department: Pyrénées-Orientales
- Arrondissement: Prades
- Canton: Le Canigou

Government
  - Mayor (2020–2026): Alain Estela
- Area^{1}: 14.50 km^{2} (5.60 sq mi)
- Elevation: 584 m (1,916 ft)
- Highest elevation: 2,784 m (9,134 ft)
- Lowest elevation: 478 m (1,568 ft)
- Population (2023): 328
  - Density: 22.6/km^{2} (58.6/sq mi)
- Time zone: UTC+01:00 (CET)
  - Summer (DST): UTC+02:00 (CEST)
- INSEE/Postal code: 66204 /66500
- ^{1} French Land Register data, which excludes lakes, ponds, glaciers > 1 km^{2} (0.386 sq mi or 247 acres) and river estuaries.

Taurinya (French pronunciation: [toʁiɲa]; Catalan: Taurinyà) is a commune in the Pyrénées-Orientales department in southern France.

== Geography ==
Taurinya is located in the canton of Le Canigou and in the arrondissement of Prades.

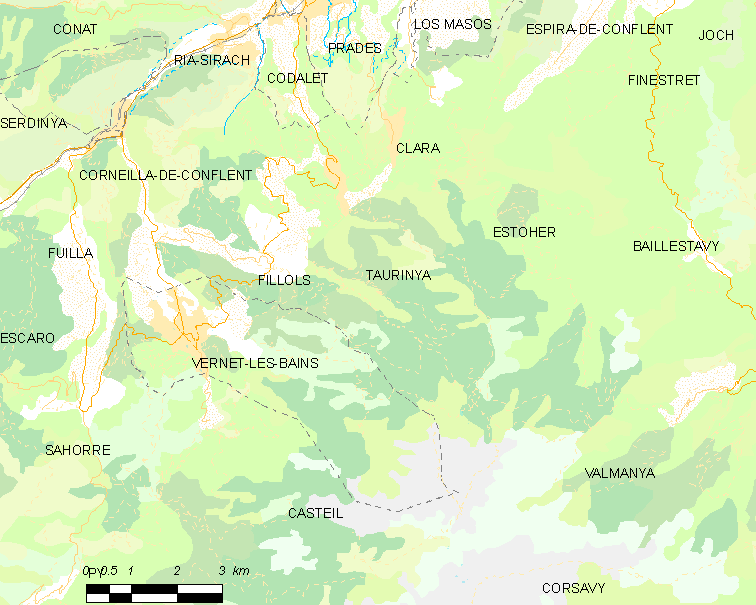
Map of Taurinya and its surrounding communes

== Population ==
Historical population
Year	Pop.	±% p.a.
1968	242	—
1975	225	−1.04%
1982	215	−0.65%
1990	248	+1.80%
1999	307	+2.40%
2007	318	+0.44%
2012	329	+0.68%
2017	336	+0.42%
2023	328	−0.40%
Source: INSEE

== See also ==
- Communes of the Pyrénées-Orientales department
