= Codalet =

- Commune
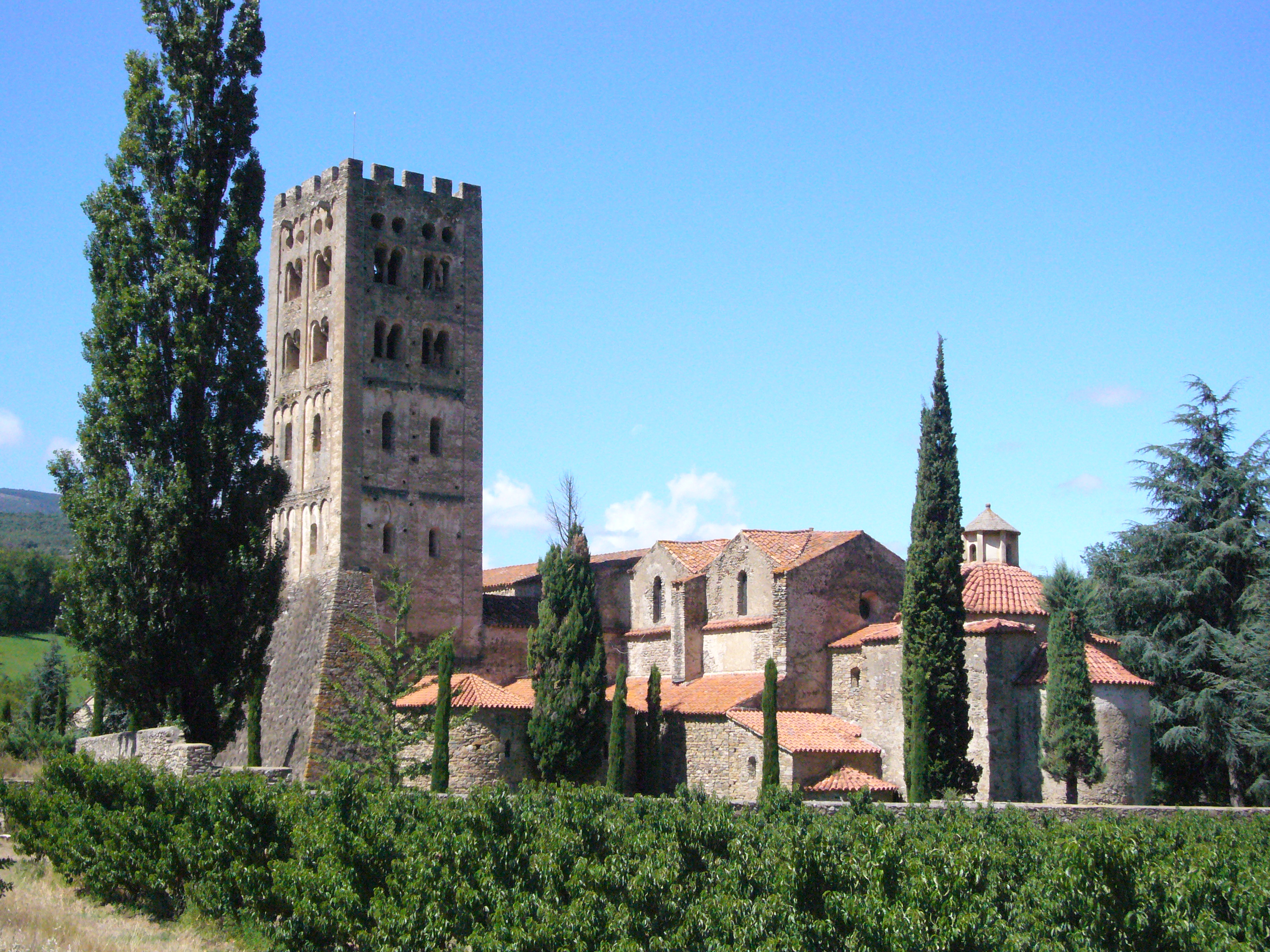
- The Saint-Michel-de-Cuxa Abbey, in Codalet

- Coat of arms
- Location of Codalet
- Location within France Location within Occitanie
- Coordinates: 42°36′40″N 2°25′02″E
- Country: France
- Region: Occitania
- Department: Pyrénées-Orientales
- Arrondissement: Prades
- Canton: Les Pyrénées catalanes

Government
  - Mayor (2020–2026): Michel Llanas
- Area^{1}: 2.78 km^{2} (1.07 sq mi)
- Elevation: 350 m (1,150 ft)
- Highest elevation: 680 m (2,230 ft)
- Lowest elevation: 347 m (1,138 ft)
- Population (2023): 350
  - Density: 130/km^{2} (330/sq mi)
- Time zone: UTC+01:00 (CET)
  - Summer (DST): UTC+02:00 (CEST)
- INSEE/Postal code: 66052 /66500
- ^{1} French Land Register data, which excludes lakes, ponds, glaciers > 1 km^{2} (0.386 sq mi or 247 acres) and river estuaries.

Codalet (French pronunciation: [kodalɛt], Catalan pronunciation: [kuðəˈlɛt]) is a commune in the Pyrénées-Orientales department in southern France.

It is very small with only a few streets but has much character. There are no shops but there is a little park with a boules court and soccer goal as well as a river running through it. Codalet has an annual garage sale for the May Day celebrations which takes place in the Codalet square. There is also the annual Flama del Canigou festival in the Prades Park.

== Geography ==
=== Localisation ===
Codalet is located in the canton of Les Pyrénées catalanes and in the arrondissement of Prades.

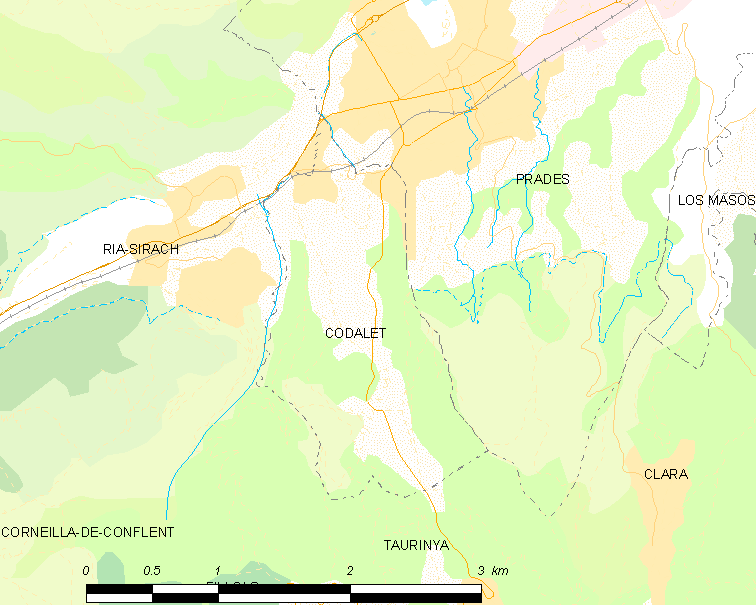
Map of Codalet and its surrounding communes

== Population ==
Historical population
Year	Pop.	±% p.a.
1968	252	—
1975	316	+3.29%
1982	311	−0.23%
1990	329	+0.71%
1999	359	+0.97%
2007	389	+1.01%
2012	360	−1.54%
2017	386	+1.40%
2023	350	−1.62%
Source: INSEE

== Sites of interest ==
Saint-Michel-de-Cuxa abbey is located on the territory of the commune.

== See also ==
- Communes of the Pyrénées-Orientales department
