= Carranza =

Carranza may refer to:

== Places ==
=== Europe ===
- Carança river in the Pyrenees
- Carranza river, a tributary of the Asón (river)
- Karrantza, a town in Biscay, northern Spain

=== North America ===
- Monclova International Airport, also known as Carranza International Airport, in Coahuila, Mexico
- Venustiano Carranza, Baja California, Mexico
- Venustiano Carranza, Chiapas, Mexico
- Venustiano Carranza, Mexico City, Mexico
- Venustiano Carranza, Michoacán, Mexico
- Carranza, a barrio in Uruca District, San José, Costa Rica

=== South America ===
- Adolfo E. Carranza, a village in Catamarca, Argentina
- Luis Carranza District, a district in La Mar, Peru
- Ministro Carranza (Buenos Aires Underground), a line and station on the Buenos Aires Underground, Argentina

== Landmarks ==
- Carranza Lighthouse, a lighthouse and landmark in Chile
- Carranza Memorial, a monument in Wharton State Forest, New Jersey
- Carranza Museum, a museum in Mexico City
- Estadio Venustiano Carranza, in Morelia, Mexico
- Estadio Ramón de Carranza, in Cádiz, Spain
- Estadio Francisco Carranza Limón, in Guasave, Mexico
- José León de Carranza Bridge, a bridge located in Cádiz, Spain

== Other uses ==
- Carranza (surname)
- Carranza Sports Club, a soccer team from Madrid, Spain
- A fictional tequila tycoon family in the television series Monarca

== See also ==
- Carranca, a type of figurehead attached to river craft in Brazil
- Venustiano Carranza (disambiguation)
