= List of lighthouses in Chile: NGA1328–NGA1540 =

This is a list of lighthouses in Chile from Robinson Crusoe Island to Bahía Corral.

== Robinson Crusoe Island ==
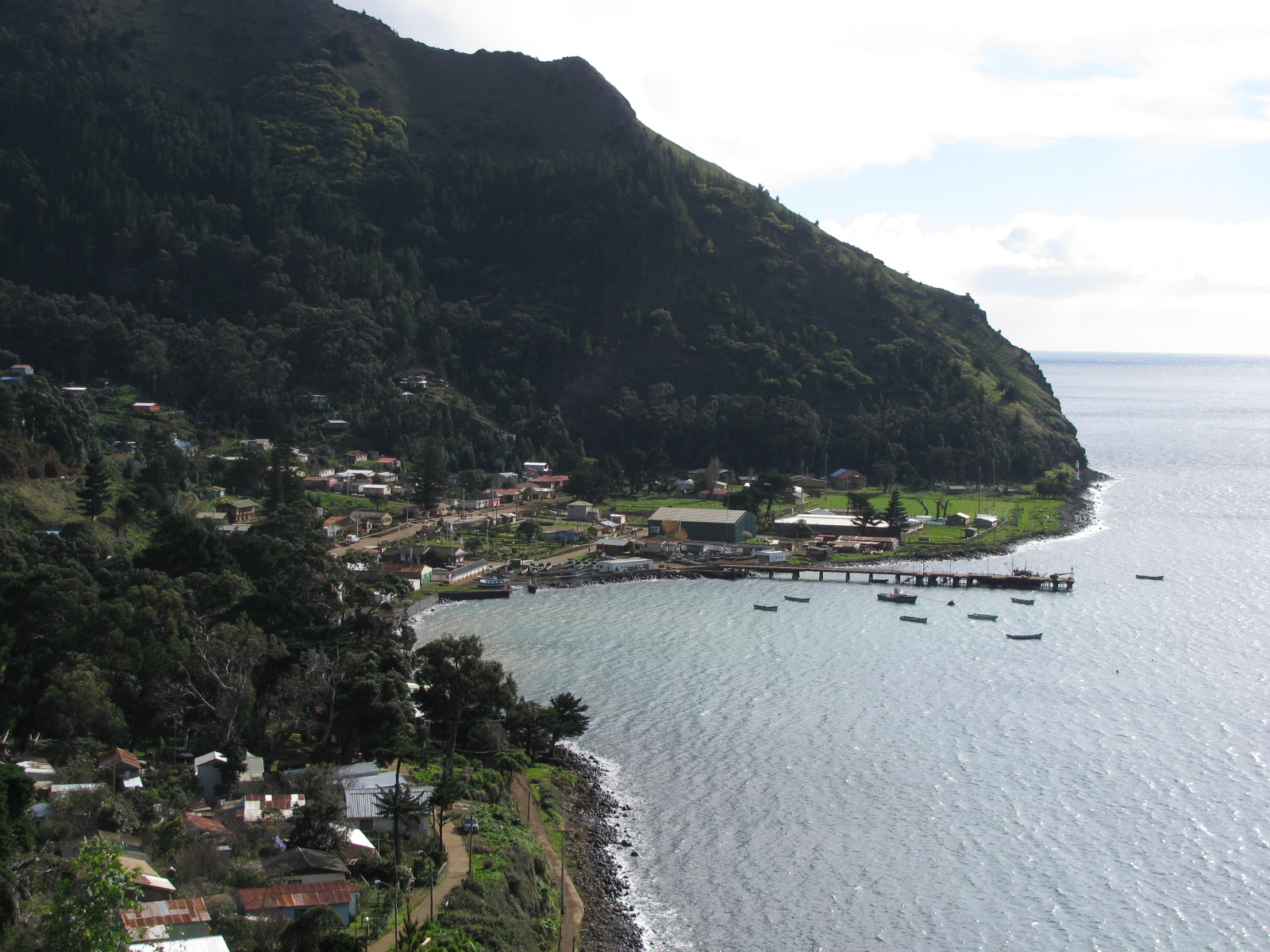
Bahía Cumberland

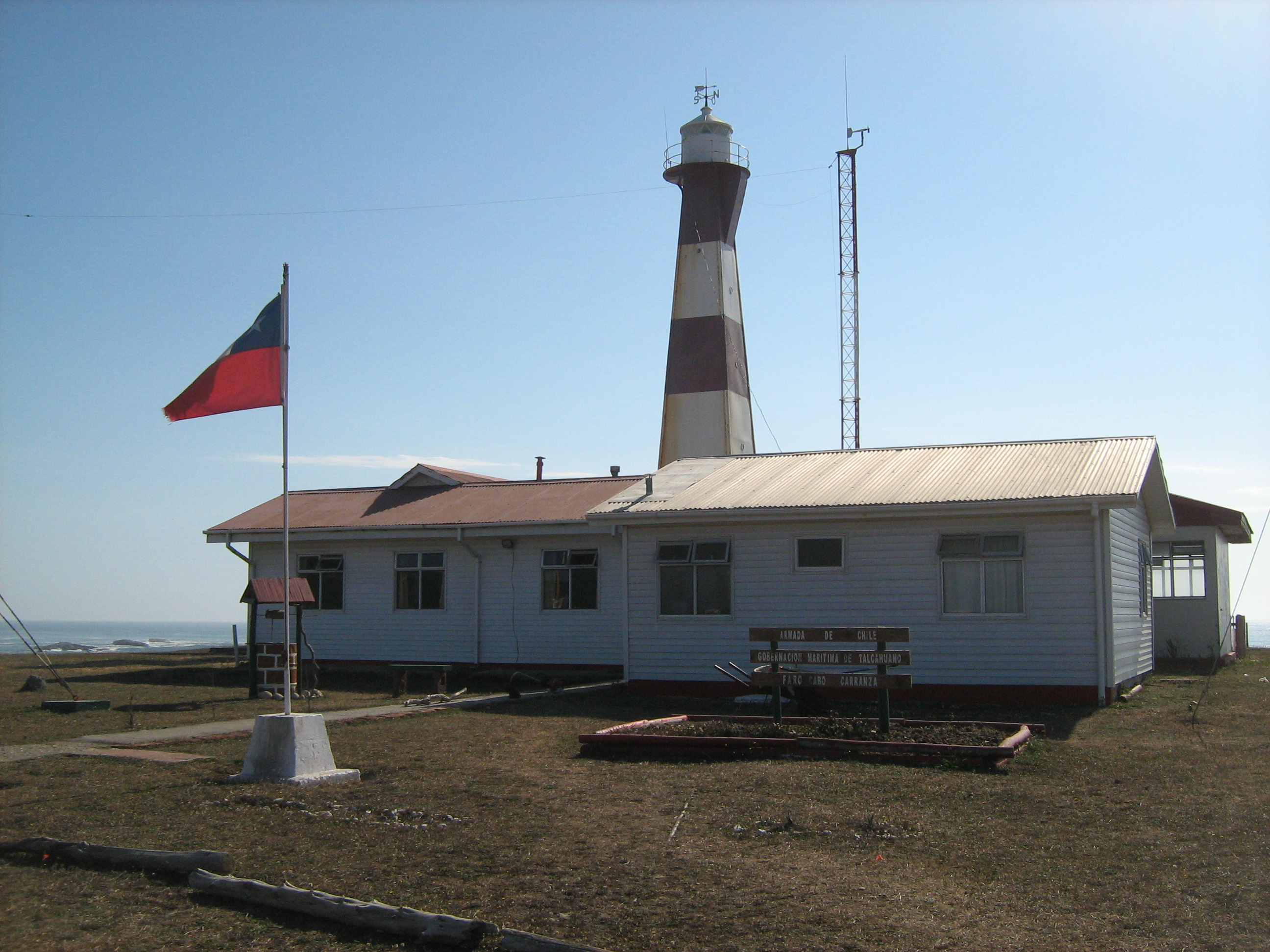
Cabo Carranza Lighthouse, also named Río Loanco

It.	NGA/Int number	Location	Coordinates	Light characteristic	Height (ft/m) Range (nmi)	Structure description	Height (ft)	Remarks
187	1328; G 1855	Punta San Carlos.	33°37.9′S 78°49.7′W	Fl.W. period 12s fl. 1s, ec. 11s	18 6 9	White fiberglass tower, red band	11.	Visible 180°-001°.
188	1330; G 1856	Bahía Cumberland.	33°38.2′S 78°49.7′W	Fl.G. period 5s fl. 1s, ec. 4s	16 5 3	Green metal framework tower	10.	Visible 184°-279°.
189	1331; G 1856.2	Bahía Padre.	33°40.0′S 78°55.9′W	Fl.W. period 5s fl. 0.4s, ec. 4.6s	20 6 8	White metal framework tower, red band	10.	
190	1331.5; G 1853	Isla Alejandro Selkirk.	33°43.6′S 80°46.4′W	Fl.W. period 10s fl. 1s, ec. 9s	30 9 3	White fiberglass tower, red band	11.	Visible 141°-351°.
191	1332; G 1850	Punta Topocalma.	34°08.0′S 72°01.0′W	Fl.W. period 10s fl. 0.3s, ec. 9.7s	387 118 16	White fiberglass tower, red band	13.	Visible 347°-210°.
192	1334; G 1848	Trilco, Punta Cardonal.	34°48.8′S 72°08.2′W	Fl.W. period 5s fl. 1s, ec. 4s	148 45 9	White building, red band	22.	Visible 037°-202°.
193	1335; G 1846.5	Muelle Maguellines.	35°21.5′S 72°27.8′W	Fl.W. period 5s fl. 1s, ec. 4s	20 6 4	White metal post, red band	10.	
194	1336; G 1846	Cabo Carranza.	35°33.4′S 72°36.8′W	Fl.W. period 10s fl. 1.5s, ec. 8.5s	171 52 21	White square metal tower, red bands	62.	Visible 038°-211°. Aero Radiobeacon 19.8 miles NNE marked by Fl.R.
195	1340	Bahía Cobquecura.	36°09.0′S 72°48.0′W	F.W.	10			Several F.W. lights.
196	1344; G 1797	Morro Lobería.	36°34.4′S 72°59.9′W	Fl.W. period 10s fl. 0.5s, ec. 9.5s	262 80 9	White fiberglass tower, red band	13.	Visible 332°-200°.
197	1348; G 1798	Isla Quiriquina.	36°36.6′S 73°03.1′W	Fl.W. period 10s fl. 0.2s, ec. 9.8s	295 90 21	White metal tower, red band	23.	Visible 048°-015°. Siren: 2 bl. ev. 30s (bl. 2s, si. 3s, bl. 2s, si. 23s).
198	1352; G 1806	Punta Arenas.	36°38.3′S 73°03.2′W	Fl.(3)W. period 9s fl. 0.5s, ec. 1.5s fl. 0.5s, ec. 1.5s fl. 0.5s, ec. 4.5s	26 8 6	White metal post, red band	21.	Visible 192°-035°.
199	1353; G 1806.5	N. Measured Mile Range, front.	36°37.8′S 73°03.0′W	F.W.	57 18 3	White fiberglass tower, red band	21.	Visible 301° 30′ -311° 30′. Q.W. 3M shown to assist identification. Occasional.
200	1353.1; G 1806.51	Rear, 624 meters 305° 30′ from front.	36°37.4′S 73°03.4′W	F.W.	172 52 3	White fiberglass tower, red band	21.	Visible 301° 30′ -311° 30′. Occasional.
201	1354; G 1806.6	S. Measured Mile Range, front.	36°38.6′S 73°03.7′W	F.W.	169 52 3	White fiberglass tower, red band	21.	Visible 301° 30′ -311° 30′. Q.W. 3M shown to assist identification. Occasional.
202	1354.1; G 1806.61	Rear, 77 meters 305° 30′ from front.	36°38.4′S 73°03.9′W	F.W.	179 54 3	White fiberglass tower, red band	21.	Visible 301° 30′ -311° 30′. Occasional.
203	1360; G 1802	N. mole, head.	36°38.1′S 73°03.2′W	Fl.R. period 3s fl. 0.4s, ec. 2.6s	16 5 3	Red metal pillar	6.	
204	1364; G 1808	S. mole, head.	36°38.7′S 73°03.8′W	Fl.W. period 8s fl. 3s, ec. 5s	16 5 6	White round metal post, red band	11.	Visible 255°-053°.
205	1376; G 1833	Penco mechanized pier, head.	36°43.1′S 73°00.4′W	Fl.R.G. period 2s fl. 0.4s, ec. 1.6s	R. 6 G. 4			G. E. side, R. W. side. Private light.
206	1380; G 1830	Isla de los Reyes E, front.	36°43.6′S 73°02.6′W	F.R.	44 14 6	White metal post, red band, white diamond daymark, orange stripe	20.	Private light.
207	1380.1; G 1830.1	Rear D, 300 meters 258° from front.	36°43.7′S 73°03.6′W	F.R.	80 24 6	White metal post, red band, white diamond daymark, orange stripe	56.	Private light.

== Talcahuano ==
It.	NGA/Int number	Location	Coordinates	Light characteristic	Height (ft/m) Range (nmi)	Structure description	Height (ft)	Remarks
208	1384; G 1820	Repair basin, breakwater, head.	36°41.7′S 73°06.2′W	Fl.(4)R. period 12s fl. 0.8s, ec. 1.2s fl. 0.8s, ec. 1.2s fl. 0.8s, ec. 1.2s fl. 0.8s, ec. 5.2s	20 6 4	Red metal tower, triangular daymark	10.	
209	1385; G 1823	Range, front, SE. of spit.	36°42.5′S 73°06.3′W	F.R.	65 20 11	Red metal tower	5.	Occasional. Private light.
210	1385.5; G 1823.1	Rear, about 107 meters 241° from front.	36°42.5′S 73°06.3′W	F.G.	85 26 11	Metal tower, red and green stripes, triangular daymark	20.	Occasional. Private light.
211	1386; G 1824	Range B, front, E. side of pier.	36°42.6′S 73°06.3′W	F.R.	26 8 11	Metal tower, red and green stripes, triangular daymark	20.	Occasional. Private light.
212	1386.5; G 1824.1	Rear, about 396 meters 195° from front.	36°42.9′S 73°06.4′W	F.G.	98 30 11	Metal tower, red and green stripes, triangular daymark	20.	Occasional. Private light.
213	1388; G 1821	W. breakwater, head.	36°41.7′S 73°06.3′W	Fl.(4)G. period 12s fl. 0.8s, ec. 1.2s fl. 0.8s, ec. 1.2s fl. 0.8s, ec. 1.2s fl. 0.8s, ec. 5.2s	20 6 4	Green metal tower, rectangular daymark	10.	
214	1390; G 1834	Puerto Lirquén, Muelle No. 1.	36°42.2′S 72°58.9′W	Fl.G. period 3s fl. 0.3s, ec. 2.7s	31 10 5	Green round metal tower	13.	Visible 070°-249°. Numerous lighted range beacons mark approaches to port and vicinity.
215	1391; G 1834.5	Muelle No. 2.	36°42.4′S 72°59.4′W	Fl.R. period 3s fl. 0.3s, ec. 2.7s	33 10 5	Red round metal tower	15.	Visible 079°-258°.
216	1392; G 1816	Marinao breakwater.	36°41.8′S 73°05.6′W	Fl.(3)R. period 9s fl. 0.5s, ec. 1.5s fl. 0.5s, ec. 1.5s fl. 0.5s, ec. 4.5s	18 6 4	Red metal post, triangular daymark	10.	
217	1396; G 1814	Belén Shoal. -RACON	36°41.8′S 73°05.0′W	Fl.(3)W. period 10s fl. 0.2s, ec. 1.2s fl. 0.2s, ec. 1.2s fl. 0.2s, ec. 7s B(– • • •) period 60s 4	36 11 9	E. CARDINAL BYB, beacon, topmark	26.	Radar reflector.
218	1399; G 1821.5	Cabeza Muelle Fogonero.	36°41.8′S 73°06.0′W	Fl.W. period 5s fl. 0.4s, ec. 4.6s	20 6 6	White round metal tower, red band	12.	Visible 267°-097°.
219	1400; G 1812	Caleta Manzano, mole.	36°41.3′S 73°06.0′W	Fl.R. period 5s fl. 1s, ec. 4s	16 5 4	Red metal triangular tower	10.	

== Bahía San Vicente ==
It.	NGA/Int number	Location	Coordinates	Light characteristic	Height (ft/m) Range (nmi)	Structure description	Height (ft)	Remarks
220	1408; G 1796	Punta Tumbes.	36°36.7′S 73°07.0′W	Fl.W. period 5s fl. 0.3s, ec. 4.7s	128 39 18	White round metal tower, red bands	21.	Visible 028°-273°.
221	1409; G 1795.75	Malecón de Atraque, terminal.	36°43.6′S 73°08.1′W	F.R.	46 14 2	Red metal triangular tower	7.	Visible 355°-025°. Private light.
222	1411; G 1795.7	Range, front.	36°43.6′S 73°08.1′W	F.G.	33 10 2	Red metal triangular tower	7.	Visible 355°-025°. Private light.
223	1411.5; G 1795.71	-Rear, about 38 meters 010° from front.	36°43.6′S 73°08.1′W	F.R.	46 14 2		7.	Visible 355°-025°. Private light.
224	1412; G 1795	C.A.P. Muelle, head.	36°44.4′S 73°07.9′W	Fl.W. period 10s fl. 1s, ec. 9s	23 7 7	White metal tower, red band	10.	Private light.
225	1414; G 1795.2	Aproximación sitio Sur Range, front.	36°44.2′S 73°07.6′W	Fl.G. period 3s fl. 1s, ec. 2s	52 16 7	Metal tower, white triangular daymark, orange stripe	46.	Private light.
226	1414.5; G 1795.21	Rear, about 115 meters 048° from front.	36°44.1′S 73°07.5′W	Fl.G. period 3s fl. 1s, ec. 2s	62 19 7	Metal tower, white and orange stripe, triangular daymark	46.	Private light.
227	1415; G 1795.3	Enfilación de fondeo Sitio Norte Range, front.	36°44.4′S 73°07.5′W	F.G.	85 26 8	Metal tower, white and orange stripe, triangular daymark	46.	Private light.
228	1415.5; G 1795.31	Rear, about 184 meters 113° from front.	36°44.5′S 73°07.4′W	F.G.	125 38 8	Metal tower, white and orange stripe, triangular daymark	46.	Private light.
229	1416; G 1795.5	Enfilación de fondeo Sitio Sur Range, front.	36°44.5′S 73°07.6′W	F.R.	30 9 8	Metal tower on shed, white and orange stripe, triangular daymark	19.	Private light.
230	1416.5; G 1795.51	Rear, about 76 meters 097° from front.	36°44.5′S 73°07.6′W	F.R.	46 14 8	Chimney, white and orange stripe, triangular daymark	33.	Private light.
231	1417; G 1795.4	Enfilación de aproximación Sitio Sur Range, front.	36°44.8′S 73°07.8′W	Fl.R. period 3s fl. 1s, ec. 2s	52 16 7	Metal tower, white and orange stripe, triangular daymark	46.	Private light.
232	1417.5; G 1795.41	Rear, about 128 meters 170° from front.	36°44.9′S 73°07.8′W	Fl.R. period 3s fl. 1s, ec. 2s	62 19 7	Metal tower, white and orange stripe, triangular daymark	46.	Private light.
233	1418; G 1826	AVIATION LIGHT.	36°46.2′S 73°03.7′W	Al.Fl.W.G.				
234	1420; G 1794	Punta Hualpén.	36°44.6′S 73°11.3′W	Fl.W. period 5s fl. 0.1s, ec. 4.9s	154 47 19	White fiberglass tower, red band	16.	Visible 040°-262°. Siren: 2 bl. ev. 30s (bl. 5s, si. 10s, bl. 5s, si. 10s).
235	1424; G 1764	Isla Santa María.	36°59.0′S 73°32.0′W	Fl.W. period 15s fl. 0.2s, ec. 14.8s	239 73 11	White fiberglass tower, red band	26.	Visible 006°-344°.
236	1428; G 1765	Punta Delicada.	37°02.1′S 73°28.3′W	Fl.W. period 10s fl. 0.7s, ec. 9.3s	30 9 7	White fiberglass tower, red band	13.	Visible 151°-045°.

== Bahía de Coronel ==
It.	NGA/Int number	Location	Coordinates	Light characteristic	Height (ft/m) Range (nmi)	Structure description	Height (ft)	Remarks
237	1432; G 1784	Punta Puchoco.	37°01.5′S 73°10.4′W	Fl.W. period 10s fl. 1.3s, ec. 8.7s	62 19 20	White fiberglass tower, red band	20.	Visible 262°-140°.
238	1432.1; G 1783.5	Range, front.	37°01.5′S 73°10.4′W	F.R.	58 18 7	White iron tower, red stripe, white triangular daymark, orange stripes	32.	
239	1432.2; G 1783.6	Rear, 112.4 meters 349° from front.	37°01.5′S 73°10.4′W	F.R.	67 20 7	White iron tower, red stripe, white triangular daymark, orange stripes	42.	
240	1436; G 1782.5	Muelle Puerto Coronel.	37°01.6′S 73°09.0′W	Fl.W. period 5s fl. 0.4s, ec. 4.6s	31 9 8	White tower, red bands	31.	Visible 320°-140°.
241	1438; G 1783	Approach Range, front.	37°01.3′S 73°09.5′W	F.G.	49 15 4	White column, red bands, white triangular daymark, orange stripes	49.	Visible 235°-055°.
242	1438.1; G 1783.1	Rear, 80 meters 325° from front.	37°01.2′S 73°09.5′W	F.G.	69 21 4	White column, red bands, white triangular daymark, orange stripes	69.	Visible 235°-055°.
243	1440; G 1782.6	N. Approach Range, front.	37°01.4′S 73°08.8′W	F.G.	49 15 7	White column, red bands, white triangular daymark, orange stripes	43.	Visible 320°-140°.
244	1440.1; G 1782.7	Rear, 160 meters 050° from front.	37°01.3′S 73°08.7′W	F.G.	52 16 7	White column, red bands, white triangular daymark, orange stripes	59.	Visible 320°-140°.
245	1442; G 1782.8	S. Approach Range, front.	37°01.5′S 73°08.7′W	F.R.	51 16 7	White metal column, red bands, white triangular daymark, orange stripes	59.	Visible 320°-140°.
246	1442.1; G 1782.9	Rear, 160 meters 050° from front.	37°01.4′S 73°08.6′W	F.R.	69 21 7	White triangular daymark, orange stripes, on roof of shed	10.	Visible 320°-140°.
247	1443; G 1782.3	Range, front.	37°01.9′S 73°08.8′W	Q.R.	62 19 7	White iron tower, red stripe, white triangular daymark, orange stripes	44.	
248	1443.1; G 1782.31	Rear, 172.5 meters 077° from front.	37°01.8′S 73°08.7′W	Q.R.	81 25 7	White iron tower, red stripe, white triangular daymark, orange stripes	57.	

== Bahía de Lota ==
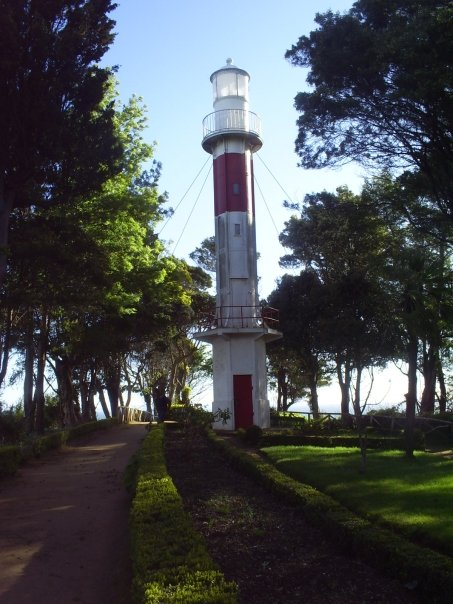
Lighthouse in Lota

It.	NGA/Int number	Location	Coordinates	Light characteristic	Height (ft/m) Range (nmi)	Structure description	Height (ft)	Remarks
249	1452; G 1768	Punta Lutrín.	37°05.4′S 73°10.0′W	Fl.W. period 5s fl. 0.4s, ec. 4.6s	160 49 8	White metal tower, red band	44.	Visible 250°-186°.
250	1476; G 1762	Punta Lavapié.	37°08.8′S 73°34.9′W	Fl.W. period 12s fl. 0.5s, ec. 11.5s	187 57 8	White fiberglass tower, red band	13.	Visible 055°-272°.

== Lebu ==
It.	NGA/Int number	Location	Coordinates	Light characteristic	Height (ft/m) Range (nmi)	Structure description	Height (ft)	Remarks
251	1480; G 1758	Punta Tucapel.	37°37.0′S 73°40.0′W	Fl.W. period 12s fl. 0.5s, ec. 11.5s	26 8 10	White fiberglass tower, red band	13.	Visible 030°-305°.
252	1484; G 1756	Punta Morguilla.	37°44.0′S 73°41.0′W	Fl.W. period 10s fl. 0.5s, ec. 9.5s	98 30 8	White tower, red band	13.	Visible 328°-172°.
253	1486; G 1754	Tirúa Inlet.	39°20.0′S 73°30.0′W	Fl.W. period 10s fl. 0.5s, ec. 9.5s	197 60 8	White fiberglass tower, red bands	11.	Visible 055°-270°.
254	1487; G 1755	Caleta Quidico.	38°14.2′S 73°29.4′W	Fl.W. period 5s fl. 1s, ec. 4s	79 24 6	White fiberglass tower, red band	11.	Visible 043°-270°.

== Isla Mocha ==
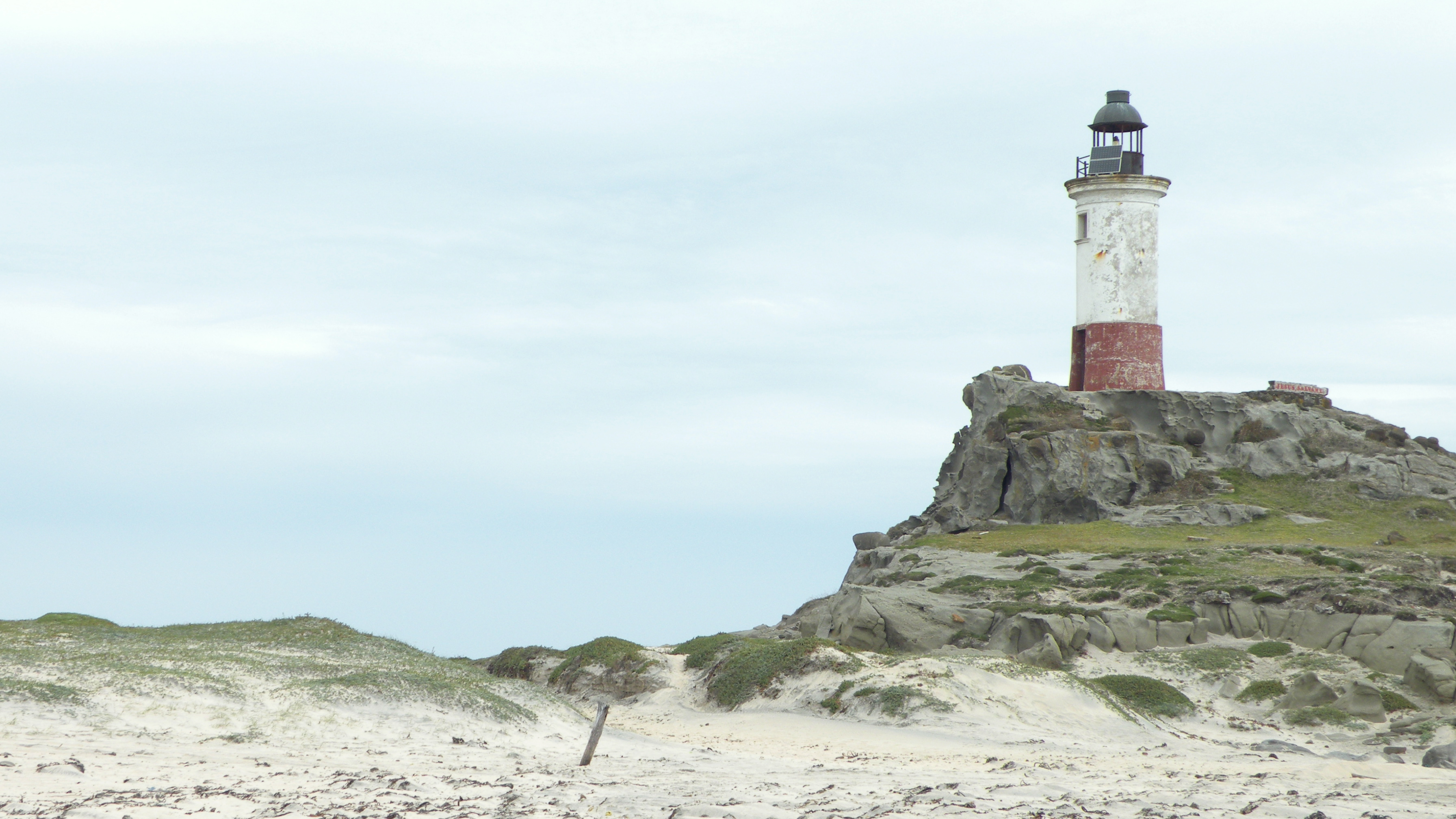
Mocha Island lighthouse

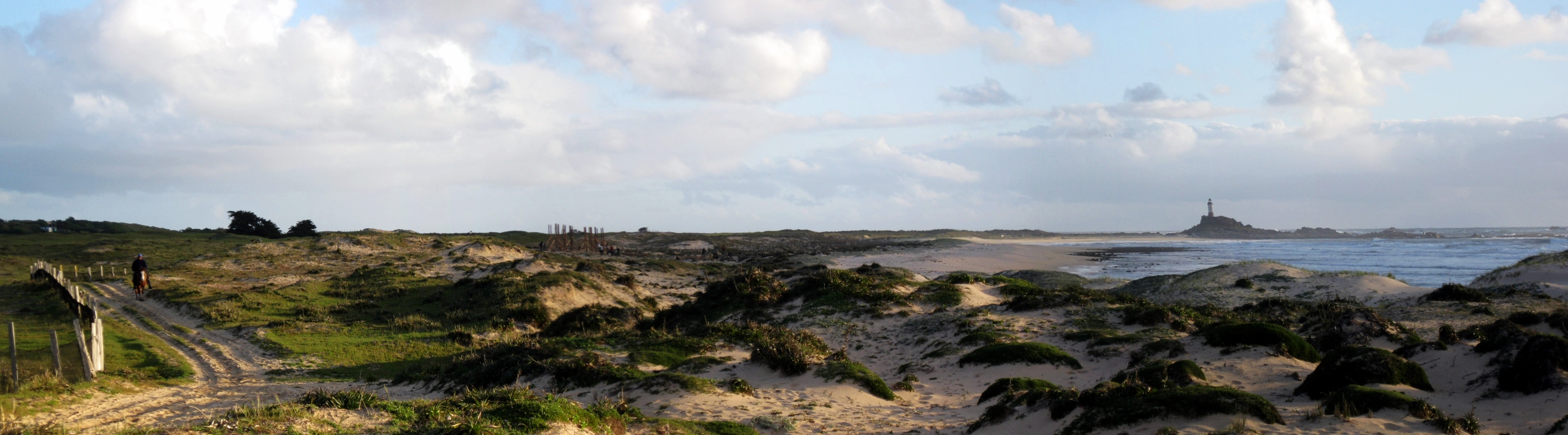
Mocha Island lighthouse

It.	NGA/Int number	Location	Coordinates	Light characteristic	Height (ft/m) Range (nmi)	Structure description	Height (ft)	Remarks
255	1488; G 1752	N. on Cerro Los Chinos.	38°20.0′S 73°57.0′W	Fl.W. period 5s fl. 0.1s, ec. 4.9s	220 67 14	White fiberglass tower, red band	26.	Visible 014°-287°.
256	1490	Mocha Weste.	38°22.1′S 73°57.4′W	Fl.W. period 15s fl. 0.3s, ec. 14.7s	98 30 15	White concrete tower, red band	42.	Visible 021°-159°.
257	1492; G 1750	Mocha Sur.	38°24.7′S 73°53.5′W	Fl.W. period 10s fl. 1s, ec. 9s	108 33 11	White fiberglass tower, red bands	26.	Visible 205°-063°.
258	1494	Roca en Barra.	39°26.7′S 73°12.6′W	Fl.G. period 5s fl. 0.5s, ec. 4.5s	15 4 3	Green metal pole, green rectangular daymark	15.	
259	1495; G 1745.4	Barra Río Lingue.	39°26.8′S 73°13.6′W	Fl.R. period 5s fl. 0.5s, ec. 4.5s	16 5 3	Red metal pole, red triangular daymark	13.	Visible 095°-268°.
260	1496; G 1747	Caleta Queule, on Punta Ronca.	39°22.8′S 73°13.5′W	Fl.W. period 5s fl. 0.4s, ec. 4.6s	164 50 6	White metal framework tower, red band	13.	Visible 065°-320°.
261	1497	La Barra.	39°23.1′S 73°13.2′W	Fl.G. period 5s fl. 1s, ec. 4s	16 5 2	PORT (B) G, tower	16.	
262	1498	Roca Queule.	39°23.2′S 73°13.1′W	Fl.G. period 3s fl. 0.3s, ec. 2.7s	13 4 2	PORT (B) G, tower	13.	
263	1499	Punta Cuartel.	39°23.2′S 73°13.1′W	Fl.R. period 5s fl. 1s, ec. 4s	16 5 2	STARBOARD (B) R, tower	13.	
264	1500; G 1744	Morro Bonifacio.	39°41.5′S 73°24.0′W	Fl.W. period 10s fl. 0.7s, ec. 9.3s	144 44 14	White concrete tower, red band	13.	Visible 014°-208°.

== Bahía Corral ==
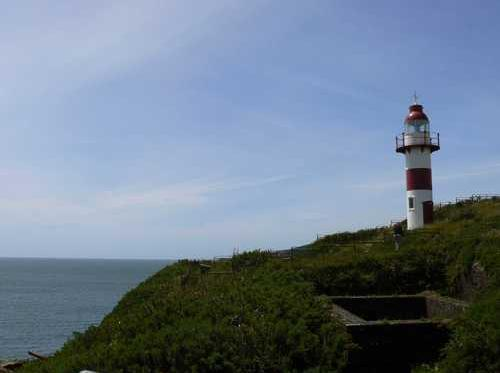
Lighthouse in Niebla, Chile at the Valdivia River

It.	NGA/Int number	Location	Coordinates	Light characteristic	Height (ft/m) Range (nmi)	Structure description	Height (ft)	Remarks
265	1504; G 1728	Morro Niebla, E. side of entrance to bay.	39°51.9′S 73°24.0′W	Fl.W. period 10s fl. 0.3s, ec. 9.7s	171 52 7	White iron tower, red band	33.	Visible 343°-210°.
266	1508; G 1730	Roca el Conde, W. side of bay.	39°52.1′S 73°25.2′W	Fl.R. period 5s fl. 1s, ec. 4s	20 6 6	STARBOARD (B) R, fiberglass tower	13.	Visible 147°-006°.
267	1516; G 1734	Corral, Muelle Fiscal de Pasajeros, head.	39°53.0′S 73°25.5′W	Fl.(2)R. period 6s fl. 0.3s, ec. 1.7s fl. 0.3s, ec. 3.7s	20 6 6	Red fiberglass pillar	9.	Visible 212°-307°.
268	1520; G 1736	Isla Mancera, N. end.	39°52.9′S 73°23.5′W	Fl.(3)R. period 9s fl. 0.3s, ec. 1s fl. 0.3s, ec. 1s fl. 0.3s, ec. 6.1s	19 6 3	Red conical fiberglass pillar	7.	Visible 043°-309°.
269	1524; G 1736.4	Muelle Isla Mancera.	39°53.1′S 73°23.2′W	Fl.R. period 3s fl. 0.3s, ec. 2.7s	26 8 2	Red metal tower, red triangular daymark	13.	Visible 132°-341°.
270	1528; G 1737.4	Muelle Niebla No. 2.	39°52.3′S 73°23.0′W	Fl.G. period 5s fl. 1s, ec. 4s	20 6 3	Green metal post	13.	Visible 219°-086°.
271	1532; G 1726	Morro Gonzalo.	39°50.9′S 73°28.0′W	Fl.W. period 5s fl. 0.4s, ec. 4.6s	144 44 10	White square concrete tower, red band	13.	Visible 026°-272°.
272	1536; G 1724	Punta Galera.	40°00.0′S 73°42.0′W	Fl.W. period 12s fl. 0.4s, ec. 11.6s	141 43 15	White fiberglass tower, red band	13.	Visible 326°-208°.
273	1538; G 1722	Caleta Mansa, Punta Moquegua.	40°35.0′S 73°44.5′W	Fl.W. period 10s fl. 1s, ec. 9s	167 51 9	White fiberglass tower, red band	13.	Visible 330°-236°.
274	1540; G 1720	Cabo Quedal.	40°59.0′S 73°56.5′W	Fl.W. period 15s fl. 0.5s, ec. 14.5s	269 82 16	White fiberglass tower, red band	13.	Visible 356°-196°.

== See also ==
- List of fjords, channels, sounds and straits of Chile
- List of islands of Chile
