= Venustiano Carranza (disambiguation) =

Venustiano Carranza was a Mexican revolutionary. Things named for Carranza:

- Venustiano Carranza, Baja California
- Venustiano Carranza, Chiapas
- Venustiano Carranza, Mexico City, a borough of Mexico City
- Venustiano Carranza, Michoacán
- Estadio Venustiano Carranza in Morelia, Mexico
- Venustiano Carranza International Airport in Monclova, Coahuila, Mexico
- Venustiano Carranza Street, a major street in the Historic Center of Mexico City
- Venustiano Carranza (Mexibús), a BRT station in Ecatepec de Morelos, Mexico
- Venustiano Carranza (Mexico City Metrobús), a BRT station in Venustiano Carranza, Mexico City

== See also ==
- Venustiano Carranza Municipality (disambiguation)
- Carranza (disambiguation)
