= Carranza (surname) =

Carranza is a Spanish surname of Basque origins. Notable people with the surname include:

== Europe ==
=== Spain ===
- Andrés Dorantes de Carranza (c. 1500–1550), Spanish nobleman, explorer and conquistador of the Narváez Expedition
- Baltasar Dorantes de Carranza, Spanish nobleman, historian, son of Andrés Dorantes de Carranza
- Bartolomé Carranza (1503–76), Spanish nobleman, theologian, imprisoned during the Inquisition
- Jerónimo Sánchez de Carranza (1539–1600), Spanish nobleman, military leader, author, and fencing master, inventor of destreza
- José León de Carranza (1892–1969), Spanish nobleman, military leader, and Francoist, son of Ramón de Carranza y Fernández Reguera
- Maite Carranza (born 1958), Catalan author
- Ramón de Carranza y Fernández Reguera(1863–1937) Spanish nobleman, military leader, former mayor of Cádiz, Spain, and namesake of the Ramón de Carranza Trophy
- Ramón de Carranza y Gómez-Pablos (1898–1988) Spanish nobleman, military leader, aristocrat, former president of Sevilla FC

== North America ==
=== Costa Rica ===
- Bruno Carranza Ramirez (1822–1891), military doctor, former president of Costa Rica
- Miguel Carranza Fernández, Costa Rican politician, father of Bruno Carranza Ramirez
- Ramón Carranza Ramírez (1819–1895), former president of the Supreme Court
- Ricardo Toledo Carranza, politician
- Manuel Carranza Vargas, painter

=== Mexico ===
- Alejandrina "Connie" Carranza Ancheta, Mexican representative and contestant of Miss Universe 1986
- Carlos María Abascal Carranza (1949–2008), conservative Mexican politician, former Secretary of the Interior
- Diego Carranza (1559-?), Mexican Dominican missionary
- Dulce Carranza (born 1990), professional volleyball player
- Emilia Carranza, Mexican actress during the Golden Age of Mexican cinema
- Emilio Carranza (1905–1928), Mexican aviator, crashed in New Jersey
- Jesús Carranza, Mexican military leader, father of Venustiano Carranza
- Sebastián Carranza Cepeda, Mexican military leader and revolutionary, nephew of Venustiano Carranza
- Venustiano Carranza (1859–1920), Mexican revolutionary, politician and president of Mexico

=== Nicaragua ===
- Margarita Carranza, wife of the president of Nicaragua José Maria Moncada

=== Puerto Rico ===
- Norma Carranza, politician for the New Progressive Party of Puerto Rico

=== El Salvador ===
- Mauricio Carranza (born 1965), athlete

=== United States ===
- Cali Carranza, Tejano singer from Texas.
- Jovita Carranza (born 1949), 44th Treasurer of the United States
- Richard Carranza, Chancellor of the New York City Department of Education
- Robert Carranza, Grammy-winning music producer

== South America ==
=== Argentina ===
- Adolfo Carranza (1857–1914), lawyer and historian who established the National Historical Museum
- Ángel Justiniano Carranza, historian, lawyer, and biographer
- Cecilia Carranza Saroli (born 1986), Olympic sailor
- César Carranza (born 1980), professional soccer player
- Julián Carranza, footballer from Oncativo, plays for Philadelphia Union.
- Roque Carranza (1919–1986), politician, former Argentine minister of defense

=== Colombia ===
- Eduardo Carranza (1913–1985), poet
- María Mercedes Carranza (1945–2003), poet and journalist from Bogota
- Víctor Carranza (1935–2013), mine owner

=== Peru ===
- José Luis Carranza (born 1964), professional soccer player
- Luis Carranza (economist) (born 1966), economist and former Minister of Economy and Finance

=== Venezuela ===
- Antonio José Carranza (1817–1893), painter from Caracas
- Ramón Carranza (1940–2003), saxophonist and composer

== Asia and Oceania ==
=== Australia ===
- Claude Carranza, guitarist of Kids in the Kitchen, rock band from Melbourne.

=== Philippines ===
- Alvin Carranza, entrepreneur, owner of Global Makati F.C. a soccer club based in Makati, Metro Manila

== See also ==
- Carranza (disambiguation)
