= Villefranche-de-Conflent =

Villefranche-de-Conflent Vilafranca de Conflent
- Commune
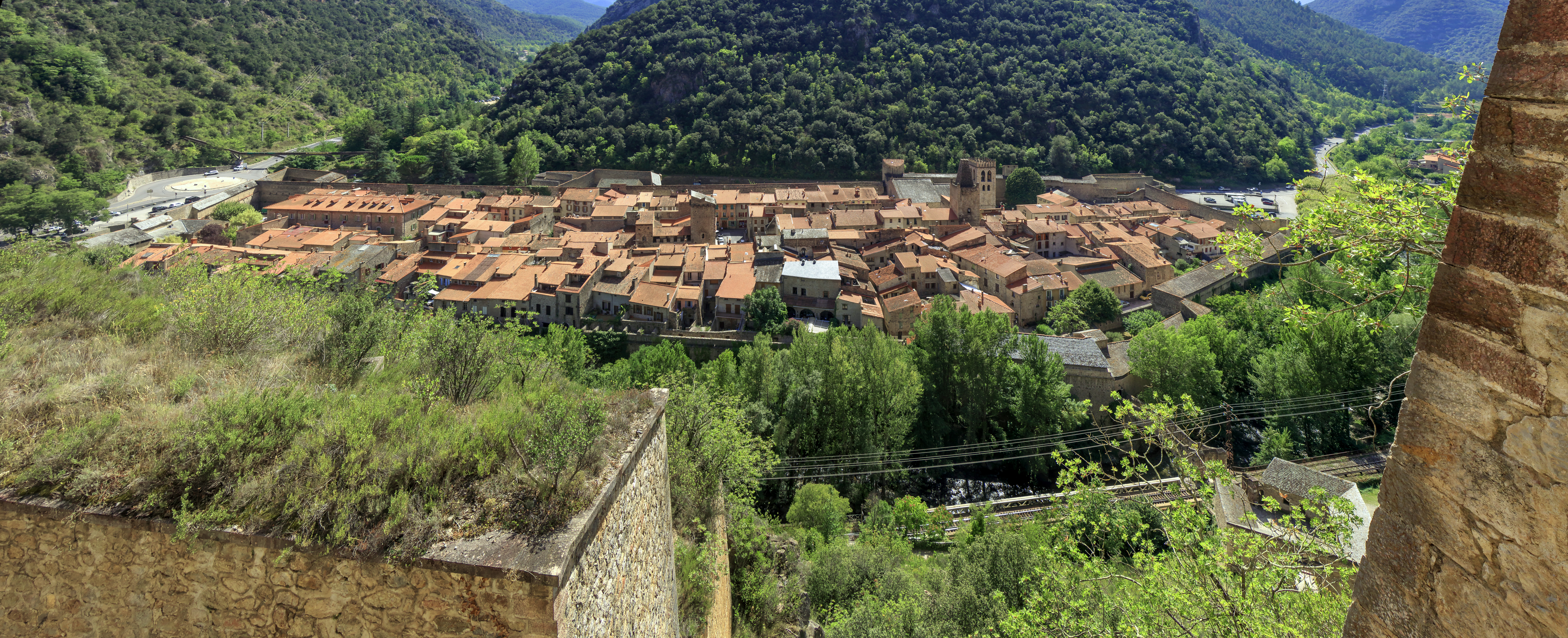
- A view of Villefranche

- Coat of arms
- Location of Villefranche-de-Conflent
- Location within France Location within Occitanie
- Coordinates: 42°35′13″N 2°22′01″E
- Country: France
- Region: Occitania
- Department: Pyrénées-Orientales
- Arrondissement: Prades
- Canton: Les Pyrénées catalanes

Government
  - Mayor (2020–2026): Patrick Lecroq
- Area^{1}: 4.46 km^{2} (1.72 sq mi)
- Elevation: 432 m (1,417 ft)
- Highest elevation: 1,395 m (4,577 ft)
- Lowest elevation: 390 m (1,280 ft)
- Population (2023): 215
  - Density: 48.2/km^{2} (125/sq mi)
- Time zone: UTC+01:00 (CET)
  - Summer (DST): UTC+02:00 (CEST)
- INSEE/Postal code: 66223 /66500
- ^{1} French Land Register data, which excludes lakes, ponds, glaciers > 1 km^{2} (0.386 sq mi or 247 acres) and river estuaries.

Street scene in Villefranche-de-Conflent.

Villefranche-de-Conflent (French pronunciation: [vilfʁɑ̃ʃ də kɔ̃flɑ̃]; Catalan: Vilafranca de Conflent) is historically a town in the Conflent region of Catalonia, and now a commune in the Pyrénées-Orientales department in southern France. It is a member of Les Plus Beaux Villages de France (The Most Beautiful Villages of France) Association.

One of the turrets in the city wall defenses designed by Louis XIV's military architect, Vauban, at Villefranche-de-Conflent, Pyrénées-Orientales region (Catalan region), France

Street scene in medieval village of Villefranche-de-Conflent, Pyrénées-Orientales region (Catalan region) France

== Geography ==
Villefranche-de-Conflent is located in the canton of Les Pyrénées catalanes and in the arrondissement of Prades.

Outside the city wall defenses designed by Louis XIV's military architect, Vauban — medieval village of Villefranche-de-Conflent in the Pyrenees, Catlan region, France

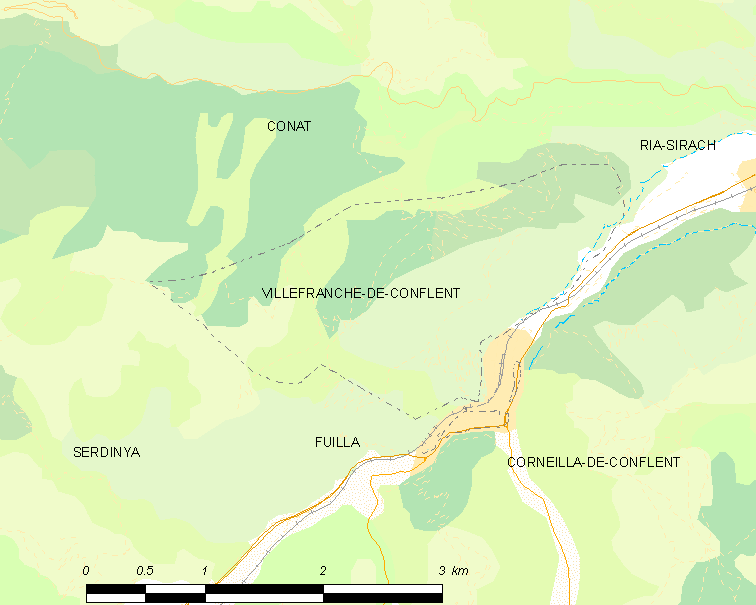
Map of Villefranche-de-Conflent and its surrounding communes

The town's confined site, at about 440 m above sea level, is relatively level ground surrounded by

- the northeast-flowing river Têt (on the town's west and north),
- the Cady, which flows north to empty into the Têt (on the east), and
- a peak (at nearly 800 m), less than 800 m away (on the south).

=== Transport ===
Roads

The N116 from Perpignan on the Mediterranean passes, as a two-lane highway, between the southern town wall and an embankment cut into the high ground to the south; this route continues west into the adjacent Cerdagne region.

Train

The town's train station starts and ends the route of the scenic Yellow train.

== History ==
The town's access to the French Cerdagne region makes it an important strategic location. It was already occupied by Celtic tribes, then by Romans, Visigoths, Moors, and finally the Catalans by the time fortifications were built by the counts of Conflent at the end of the 9th century. On April 9, 1090 or 1091, (depending on the source,) Guillem Ramon, then Count of Cerdanya, and vassal of the kingdom of Aragon, founded the city of Villefranche-de-Conflent within the already-existing fortifications. Ramon's aim was to make the town the new capital of the Conflent territory. Furthermore, Ramon wanted to make it quite impossible for potential invaders to access the road to the high plateaux of Cerdanya.

The first urban walls (not merely fortifications,) date back to the 12th century. These walls stood in the way of anyone wanting to pass through on the existing road, thus making passage of intruders difficult without a siege of the walled town. To ensure the success of the new city, Count Ramon guaranteed freedom from taxes for the first 3 years of new settlers' residence in the town, plus the establishment of a market, and a decree that there would be no competing markets anywhere else in Cerdanya, except in the town of Ix. Due to this freedom from the typical obligations of serfdom, Ramon named the town Vila de Vilafranca de Conflent which means "town of freedom in the Conflent region" in Catalan. The Conflent, from the Latin term "confluent," is the historical name for the watershed area that flows towards the River Têt.

Inside the city walls built by the military architect of Louis XIV, Vauban, completed in 1681, at Villefranche-de-Conflent, in the Pyrénées-Orientales region (Catalan region) of France.

In 1374, Villefranche resisted the siege of Jaume III the son of last king of Majorca. In the mid-1400s, when it was a Spanish possession, ramparts were adapted by adding slits in the walls to allow for firearms. In July 1654, the French captured the city after nine days, and the troops of Louis XIV took Puigcerda from the Spaniards. After capturing Villefranche-de-Conflent in 1654, the French demolished 300 metres of the medieval walls, and four of the town’s eight towers in 1655–1656, to make the village undesirable for the Spanish to reclaim. Only the rampart along the Têt was spared.

When the territory was ceded to the French after the Treaty of the Pyrenees (1659), the town began to be looked upon as an important French defense against possible Spanish incursions. The town became part of the program of construction and improvement of outlying French defenses, which included building the Fort Libéria on a hill above the village by Sébastien Le Prestre de Vauban, the military engineer of Louis XIV. Villefranche-de-Conflent was listed as a UNESCO World Heritage Site in 2008.

The defensive walls of the town remain today as they were when completed by Vauban in 1681, along with almost all the medieval houses inside the walls. Villefranche-de-Conflent attracts many tourists to visit this well-preserved medieval town.

Street scene in medieval village of Villefranche-de-Conflent, Pyrénées-Orientales region (Catalan region) France

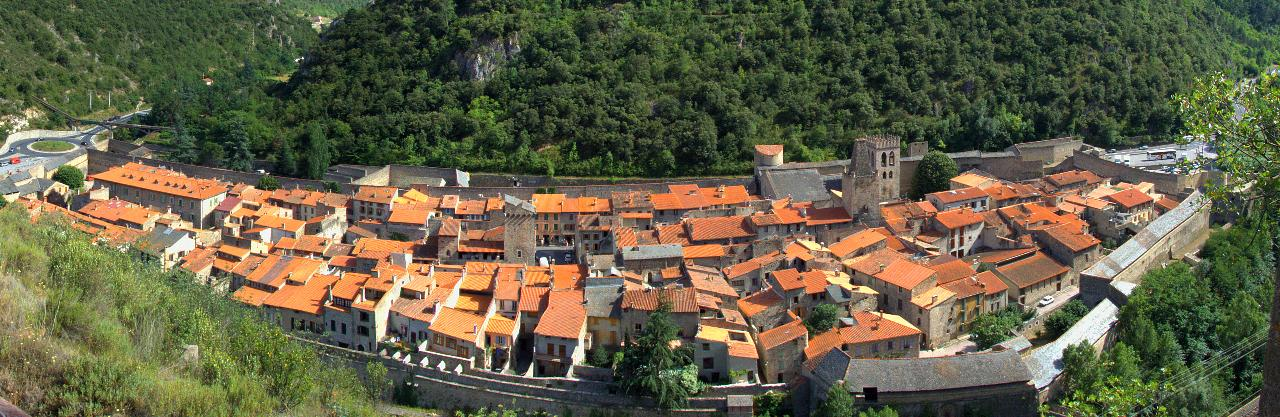
Villefranche-de-Conflent, viewed from the north

== Population ==
Historical population
Year	Pop.	±% p.a.
1968	507	—
1975	435	−2.16%
1982	294	−5.44%
1990	261	−1.48%
1999	225	−1.64%
2007	235	+0.55%
2012	229	−0.52%
2017	213	−1.44%
2023	215	+0.16%
Source: INSEE

== See also ==
- Communes of the Pyrénées-Orientales department
- Les Plus Beaux Villages de France
