= Venustiano Carranza Municipality =

Venustiano Carranza Municipality may refer to:

- Venustiano Carranza Municipality, Chiapas - one of the municipalities of Chiapas
- Venustiano Carranza Municipality, Michoacán - one of the municipalities of Michoacán
- Venustiano Carranza Municipality, Puebla

== See also ==
- Venustiano Carranza (disambiguation)
