= Têt (river) =

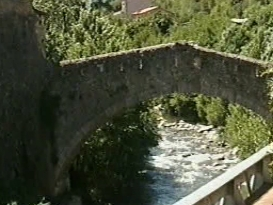
- Têt near Villefranche-de-Conflent

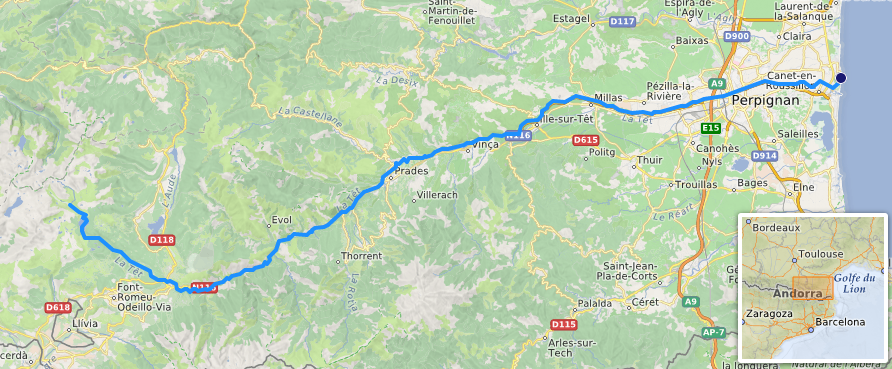
- Native name: La Têt (French)

Location
- Country: France

Physical characteristics
- Source
  - location: Pyrenees
  - elevation: ±2,400 m (7,900 ft)
- Mouth
  - location: Mediterranean Sea
  - coordinates: 42°42′48″N 3°2′23″E
- Length: 115 km (71 mi)
- Basin size: 1,550 km^{2} (600 mi^{2})
- Discharge
  - average: 7.5 m^{3}/s (260 cu ft/s)

The Têt (French: [tɛt]; Catalan: Tet [ˈtɛt]) is the largest river in Pyrénées-Orientales, southwestern France. It is 115 kilometres (71 mi) long. The Têt has its source at the foot of the Puig de la Cometa de l'Espagne in the Carlit massif in the eastern Pyrenees. It crosses the Pyrénées-Orientales département (Northern Catalonia) from West to East and ends in the Mediterranean Sea, near Perpignan (Catalan: Perpinyà).

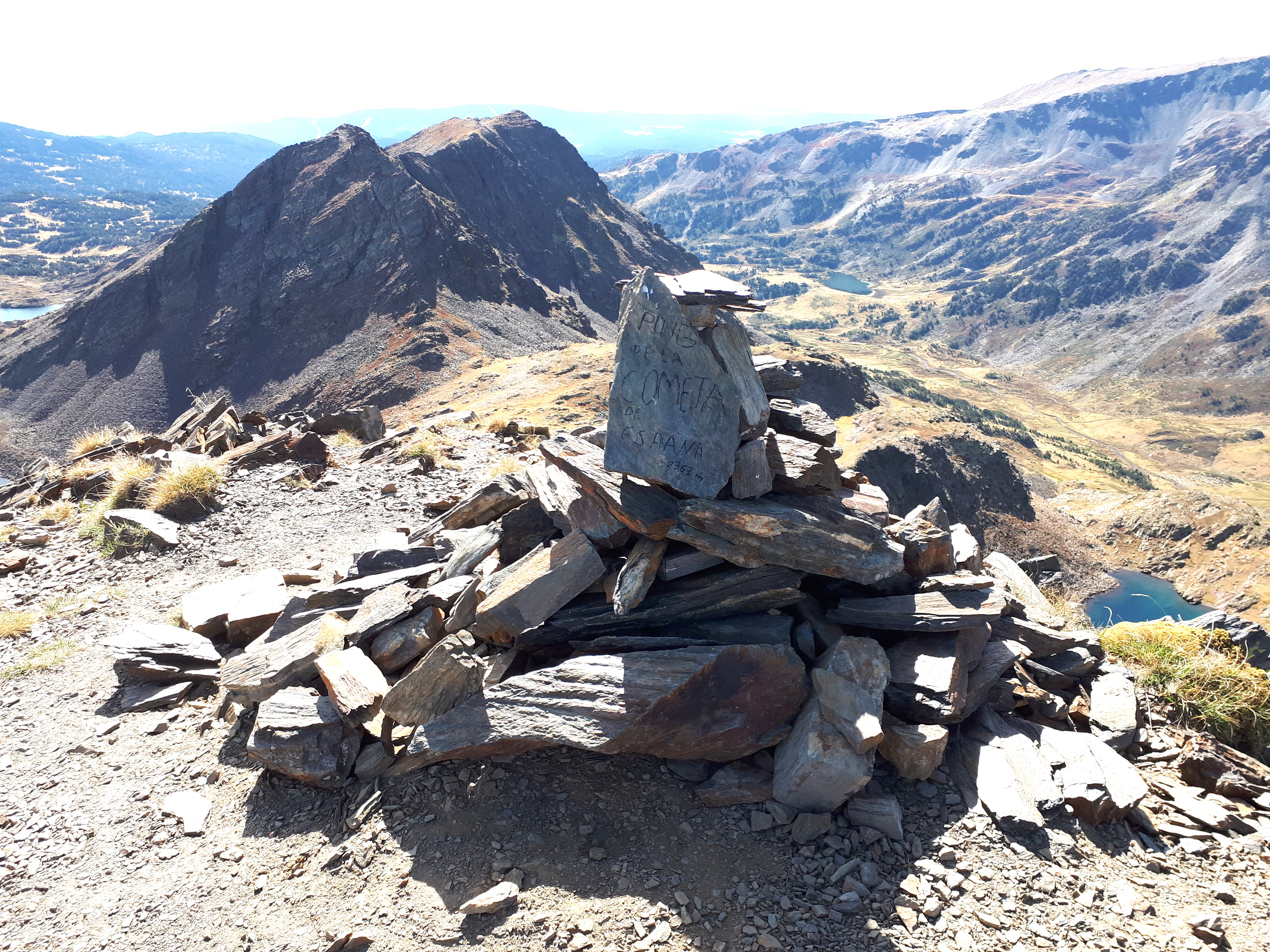
Puig de la Cometa de l'Espagne (2,763m). Below, on the right: the upper part of the Têt valley (here known as the vallée de la Grava).

A staircase of fluvial terraces of the Têt along the length of the valley has been studied in detail.

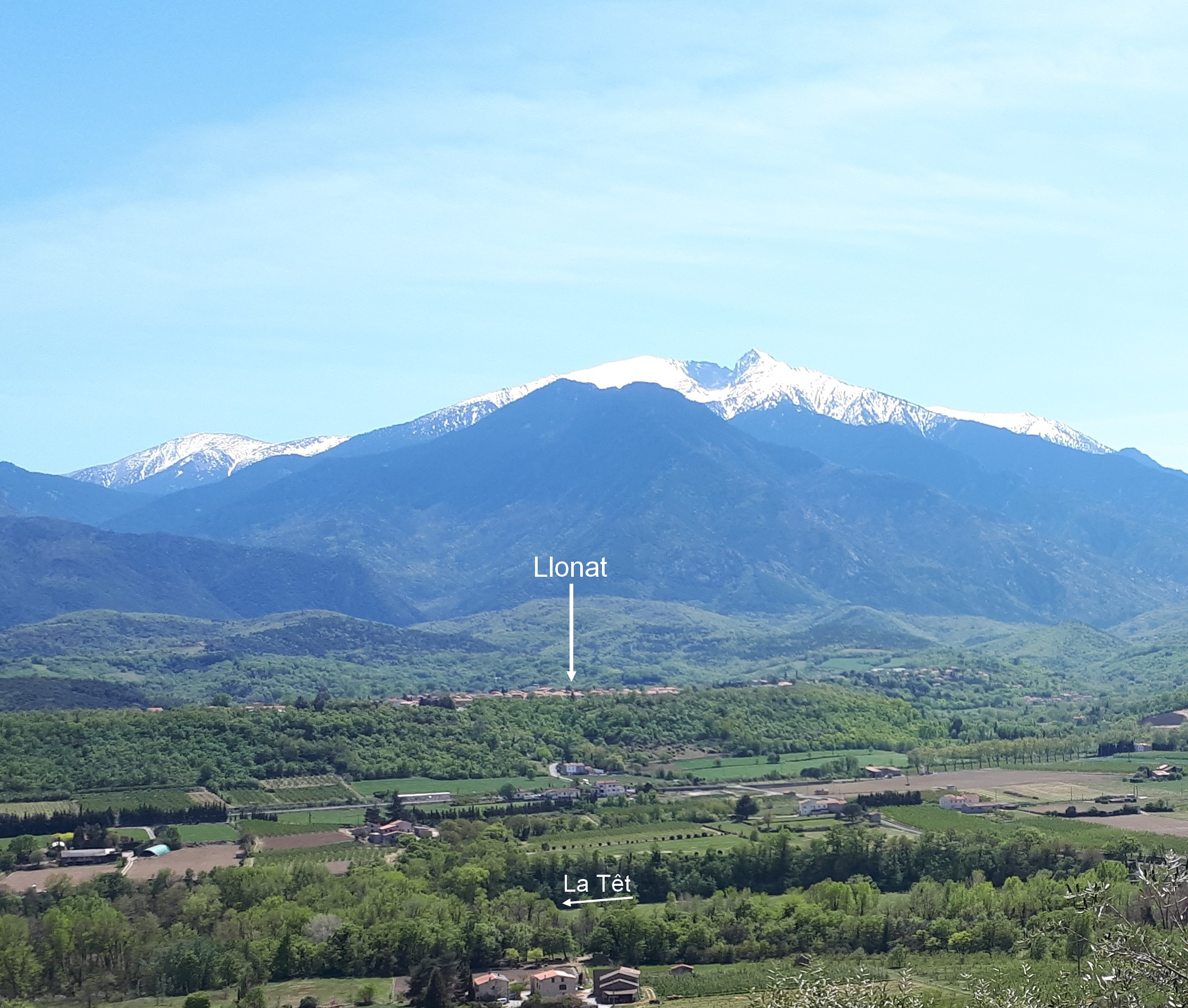
Llonat sits on a well-conserved vestige of an alluvial terrace of the Têt, about 100 metres above the river. It is thought that the terrace was formed just over half a million years ago. In the distance: the Pic du Canigou.

== Tributaries include ==
- Riberole
- Carança
- Mantet
- Rotja
- Cady
- Castellane
- Lentillà
- Boulès
- Basse

== Towns along the river ==
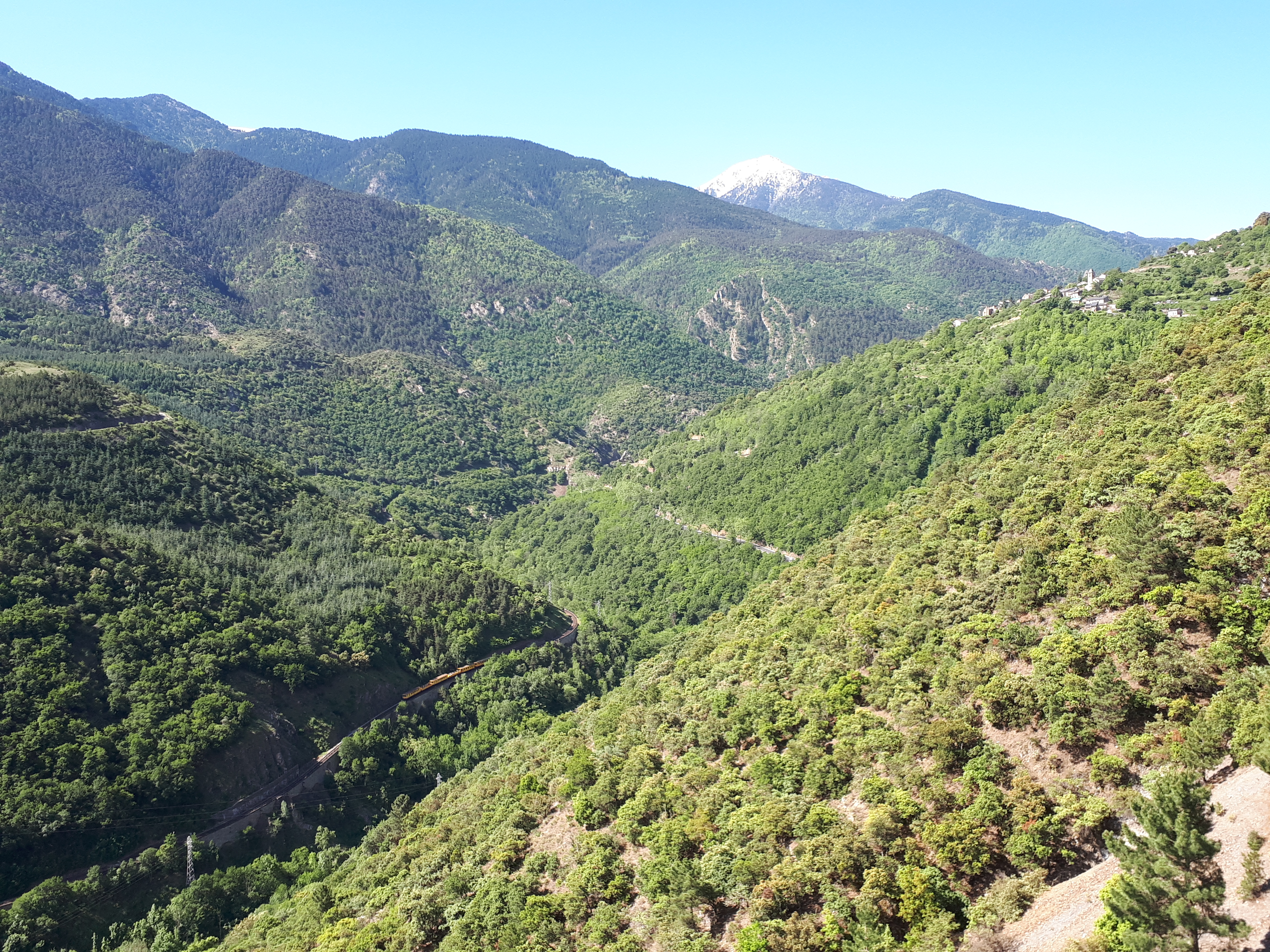
The Têt valley near Olette. The village of Canaveilles is beyond, on the right. Below, left, a "yellow train" is running on the line which descends the valley.

- Mont-Louis (Montlluís)
- Olette (Oleta)
- Villefranche-de-Conflent (Vilafranca de Conflent)
- Prades (Prada de Conflent)
- Perpignan (Perpinyà)
- Ille-sur-Têt (Illa)
