= Carança =

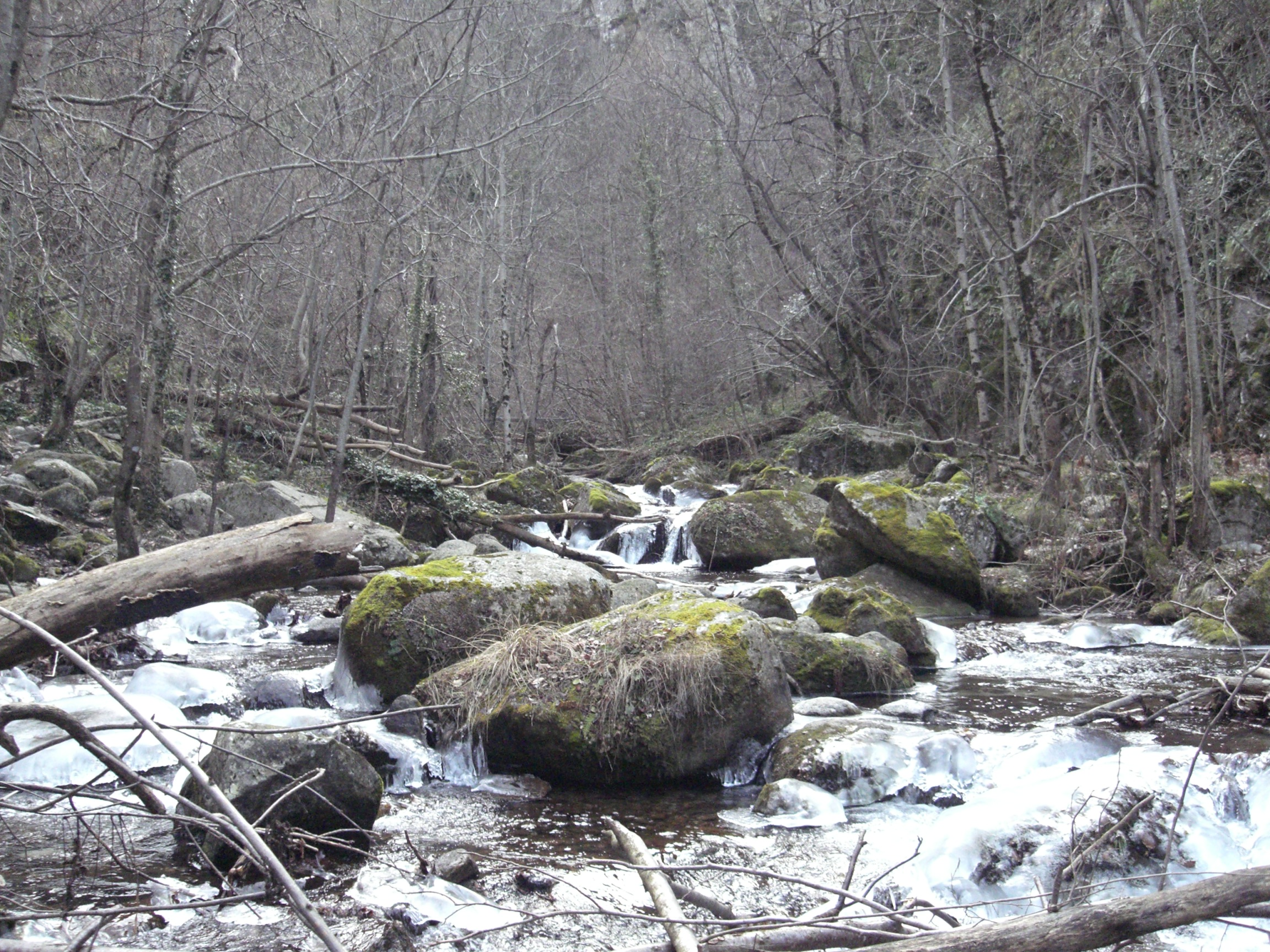

- Location within France Location within Occitanie

Location
- Country: France

Physical characteristics
- Source
  - location: Pyrenees
- Mouth
  - location: Têt
  - coordinates: 42°31′28″N 2°13′14″E
- Length: 15.3 km (9.5 mi)

Basin features
- Progression: Têt→ Mediterranean Sea

Carança (French pronunciation: [kaʁɑ̃sa]) is a river in Pyrénées-Orientales, France. It flows into the Têt at Thuès-Entre-Valls. It is 15.3 km (9.5 mi) long.
