= Cady (river) =

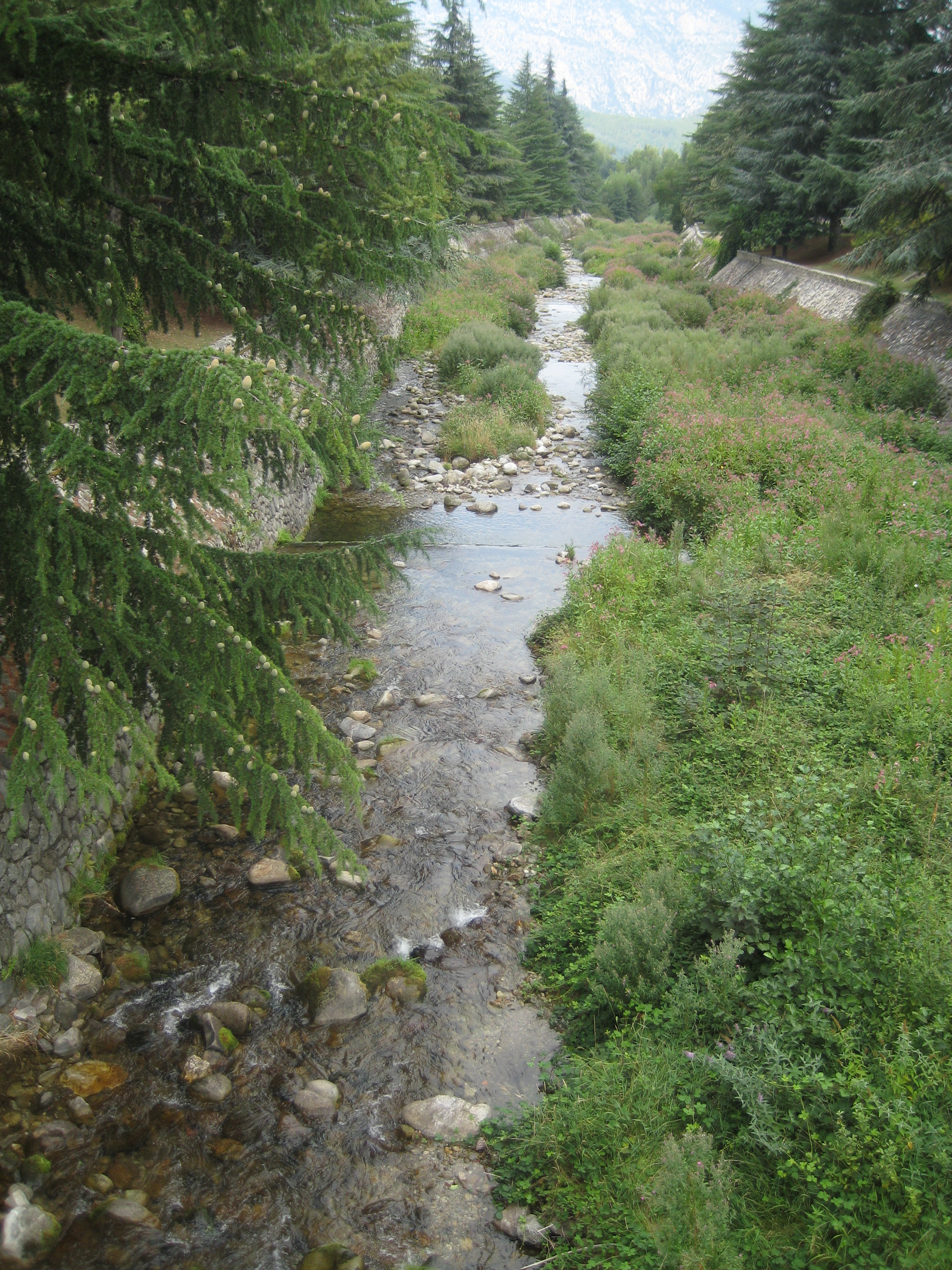
- The Cady river at Vernet-les-Bains

- Location within France Location within Occitanie

Location
- Country: France

Physical characteristics
- Source
  - location: Pyrenees
- Mouth: Têt
  - coordinates: 42°35′16″N 2°22′11″E
- Length: 19 km (12 mi)

Basin features
- Progression: Têt→ Mediterranean Sea

The Cady (French pronunciation: [kadi]; Catalan: Cadí) is a 19 km long river in the Catalan Pyrenees of southern France, near the border with eastern Spain. It rises on the slopes of the Canigou, and flows through the Cadí cirque where it feeds the Cadí Lakes. It then flows westwards for four kilomètres, before turning to the north, through the Cady Gorge. There, fed by meltwater from glaciers higher up during the Pleistocene (approximately the last two million years), the river has carved a deep, winding gorge through the Paleozoic granite and gneiss of this section of the Canigou massif. Beyond the gorge, the river continues northward through Casteil and Vernet-les-Bains to Villefranche-de-Conflent, where it empties into the Têt.

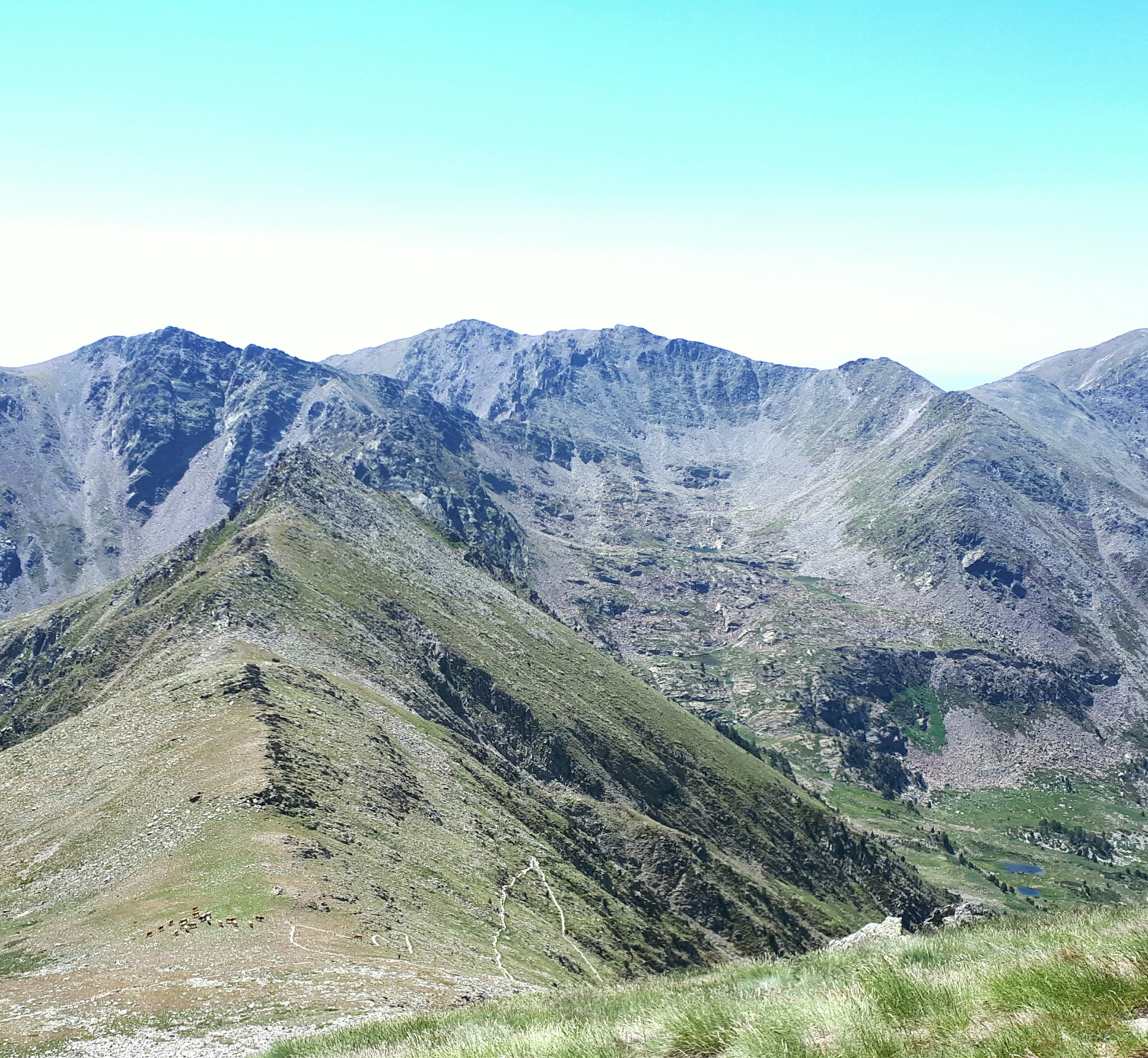
The "Gourgs de Cady", the location of the source of the river and of the Cadí cirque and Cadí lakes.

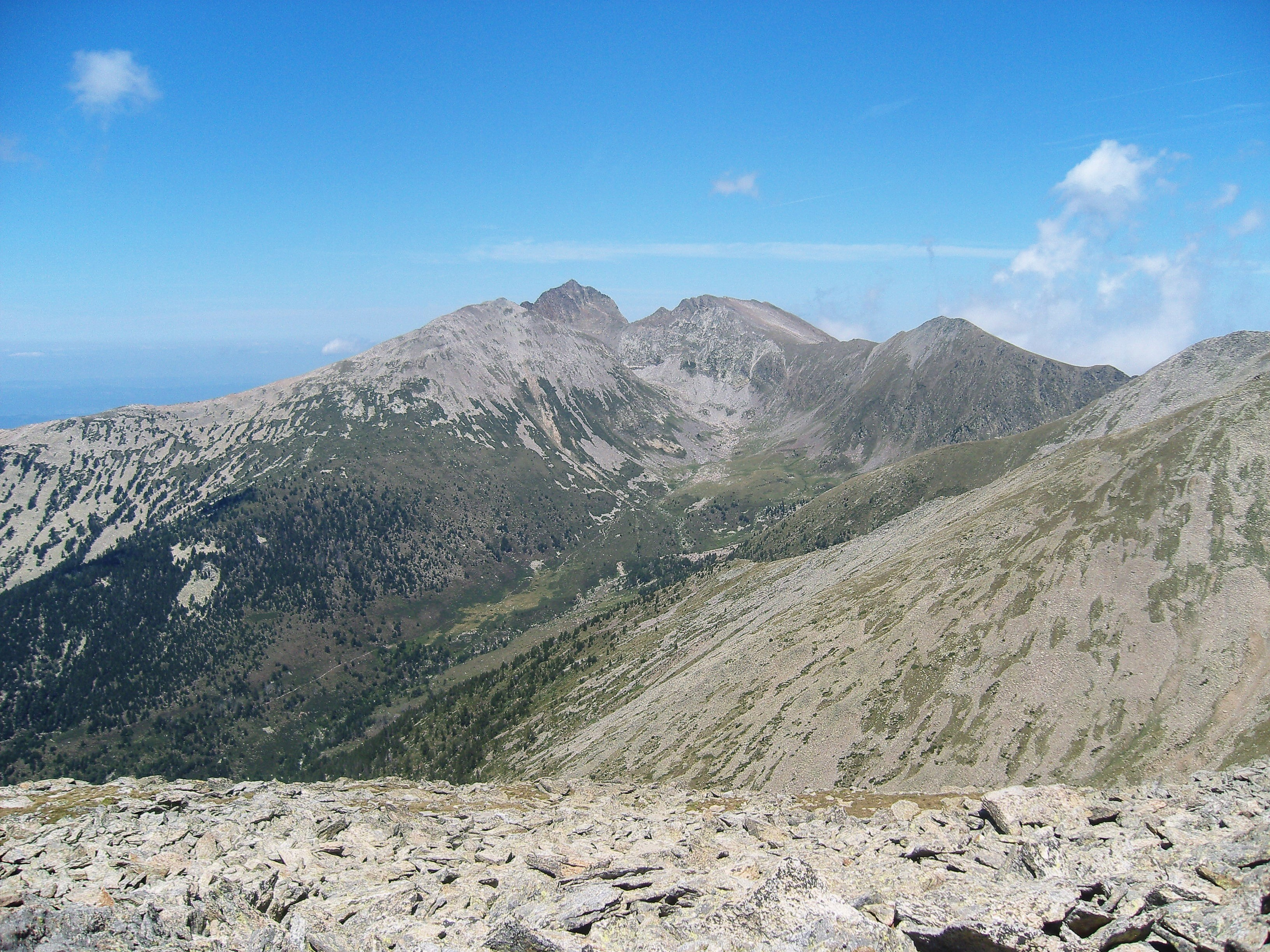
The Pic du Canigou, and the upper part of the Cady valley.

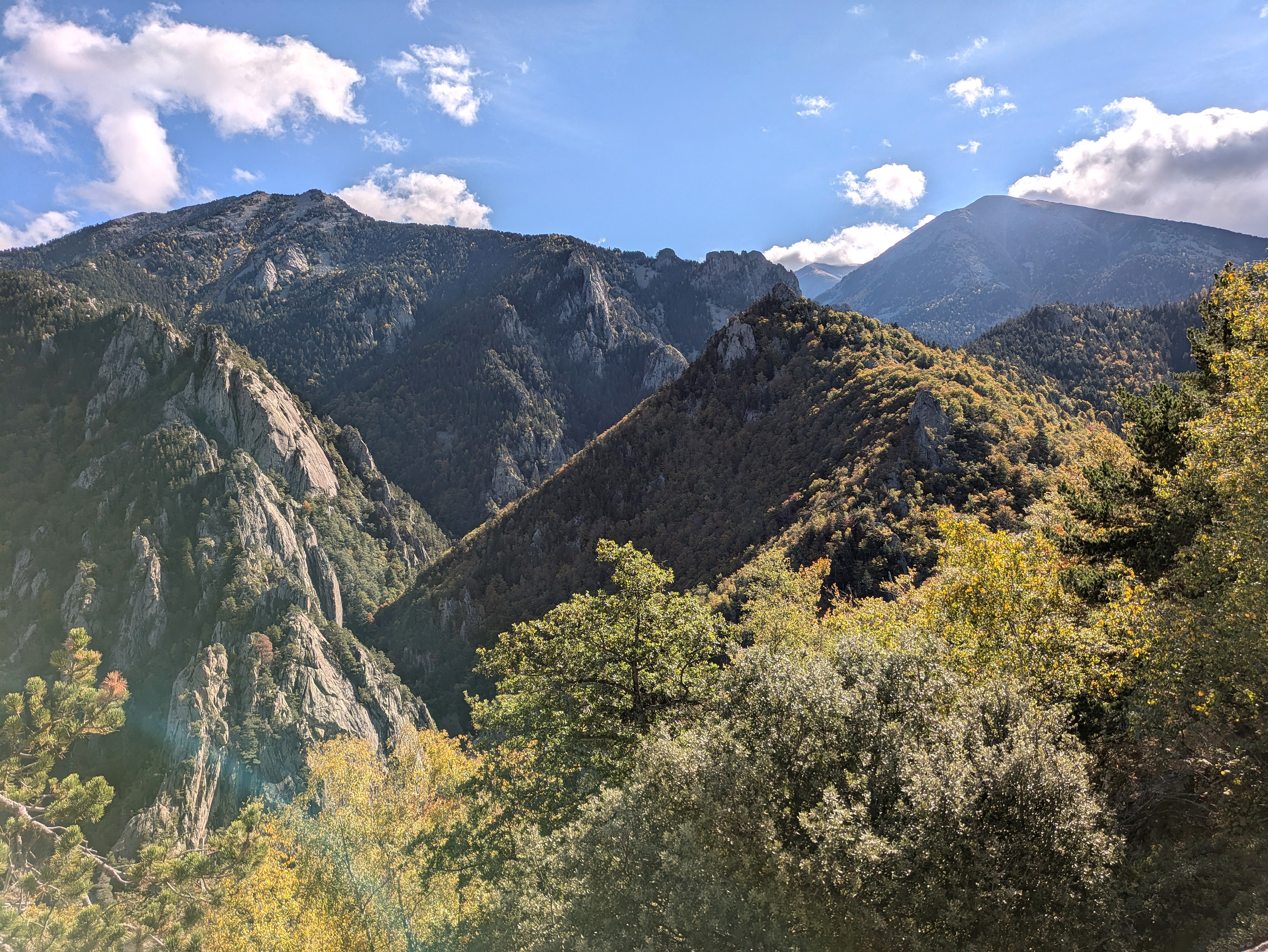
The upper section of the Cady Gorge.

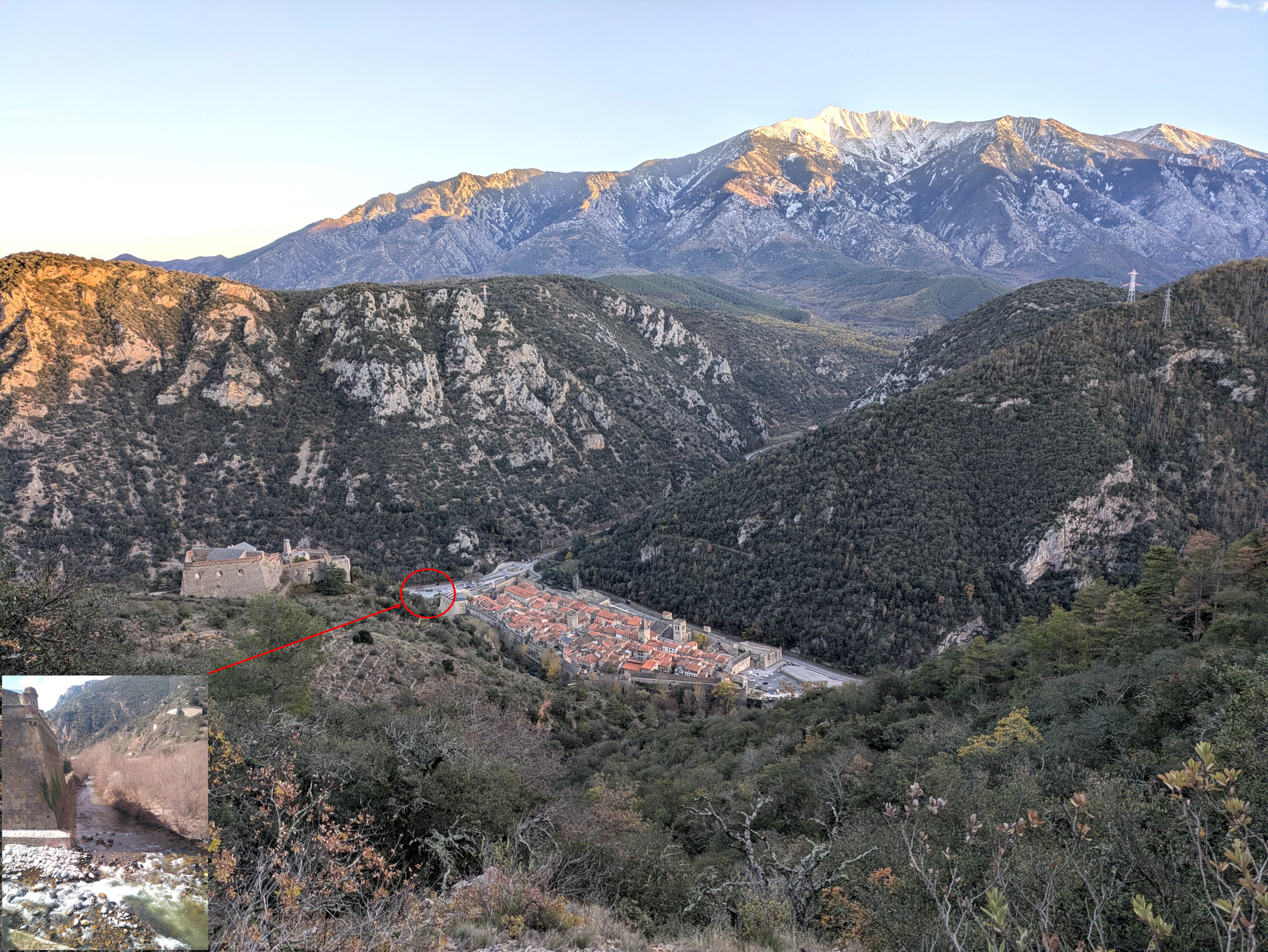
The confluence of the Cady and Têt rivers.
