= Carranza Lighthouse =

Lighthouse in Chile

Carranza lighthouse
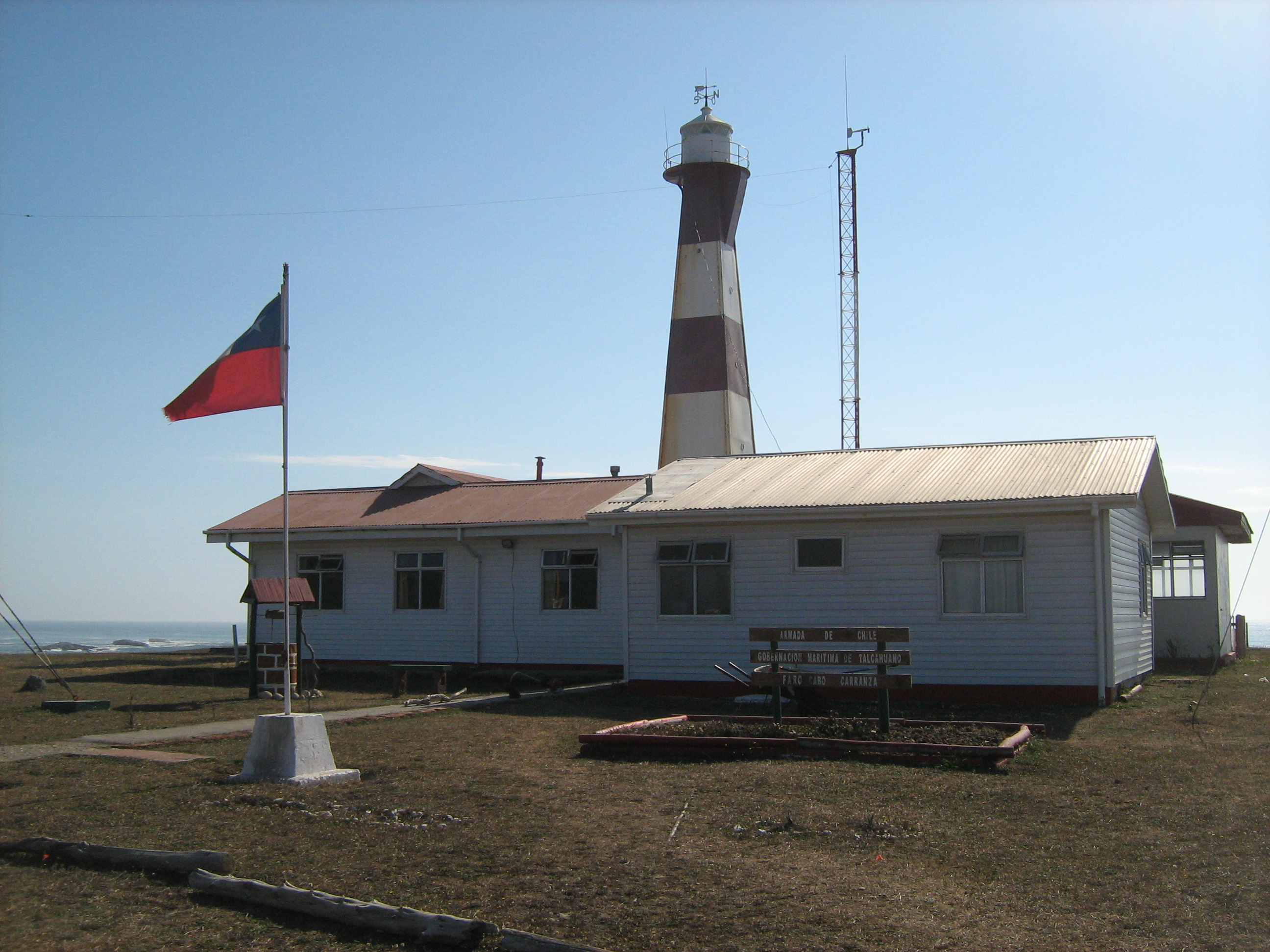
- Cabo Carranza Lighthouse
- Location: Punta Santa Ana; Maule Region; Chile
- Coordinates: 35°33′36″S 72°36′48″W

Tower
- Constructed: 1895
- Construction: cast iron
- Height: 18.8 m (62 ft)
- Shape: square
- Markings: red and white bands
- Operator: Chilean Navy

Light
- First lit: 1895
- Focal height: 52 m (171 ft)
- Intensity: 0,000 candela
- Range: 21 nmi (39 km)
- Characteristic: Fl W 10s

The Carranza Lighthouse, also known as Lighthouse Cabo Carranza, is an active 19th century Chilean lighthouse situated in the Maule Region. It is part of the network of lighthouses in Chile.

== History ==
This lighthouse was inaugurated on September 1, 1895, in the vicinity of Caleta Loanco. It has the peculiarity of being the only Chilean lighthouse with metallic pyramidal tower and a rectangular base.

Construction of the light was motivated by shipwrecks in the vicinities to the Punta Santa Ana, the most well known being that of the Cazador on January 30, 1856. Also, in the vicinity is the wreck of the SS John Elder, that was lost on January 17, 1892, during a cruise between Valparaíso and Talcahuano. Although carrying 132 people, there were no human losses.

At present it houses personnel of the Chilean Navy, as well as serving as an aid to navigation, since 1979 it has also been used as a meteorological station.

== Climate ==
Climate data for Punta Carranza
Month	Jan	Feb	Mar	Apr	May	Jun	Jul	Aug	Sep	Oct	Nov	Dec	Year
Mean daily maximum °C (°F)	17.2 (63.0)	18.6 (65.5)	17.6 (63.7)	15.7 (60.3)	14.7 (58.5)	13.4 (56.1)	13.1 (55.6)	13.2 (55.8)	13.6 (56.5)	14.9 (58.8)	16.2 (61.2)	17.6 (63.7)	15.5 (59.9)
Daily mean °C (°F)	15.0 (59.0)	15.0 (59.0)	14.2 (57.6)	12.7 (54.9)	11.7 (53.1)	10.6 (51.1)	10.1 (50.2)	10.2 (50.4)	10.8 (51.4)	11.8 (53.2)	13.1 (55.6)	14.2 (57.6)	12.4 (54.4)
Mean daily minimum °C (°F)	11.2 (52.2)	11.3 (52.3)	10.6 (51.1)	9.3 (48.7)	8.3 (46.9)	7.4 (45.3)	6.8 (44.2)	6.6 (43.9)	7.1 (44.8)	8.9 (48.0)	9.3 (48.7)	10.3 (50.5)	8.9 (48.1)
Average precipitation mm (inches)	6.6 (0.26)	6.7 (0.26)	18.1 (0.71)	41.4 (1.63)	148.8 (5.86)	176.9 (6.96)	177.6 (6.99)	116.6 (4.59)	60.6 (2.39)	28.8 (1.13)	18.1 (0.71)	11.7 (0.46)	811.9 (31.95)
Source: Meteorología Interactiva

== See also ==
- Lighthouses in Chile
- List of lighthouses in Chile
