= Axat =

Commune in Occitanie, France

- Commune
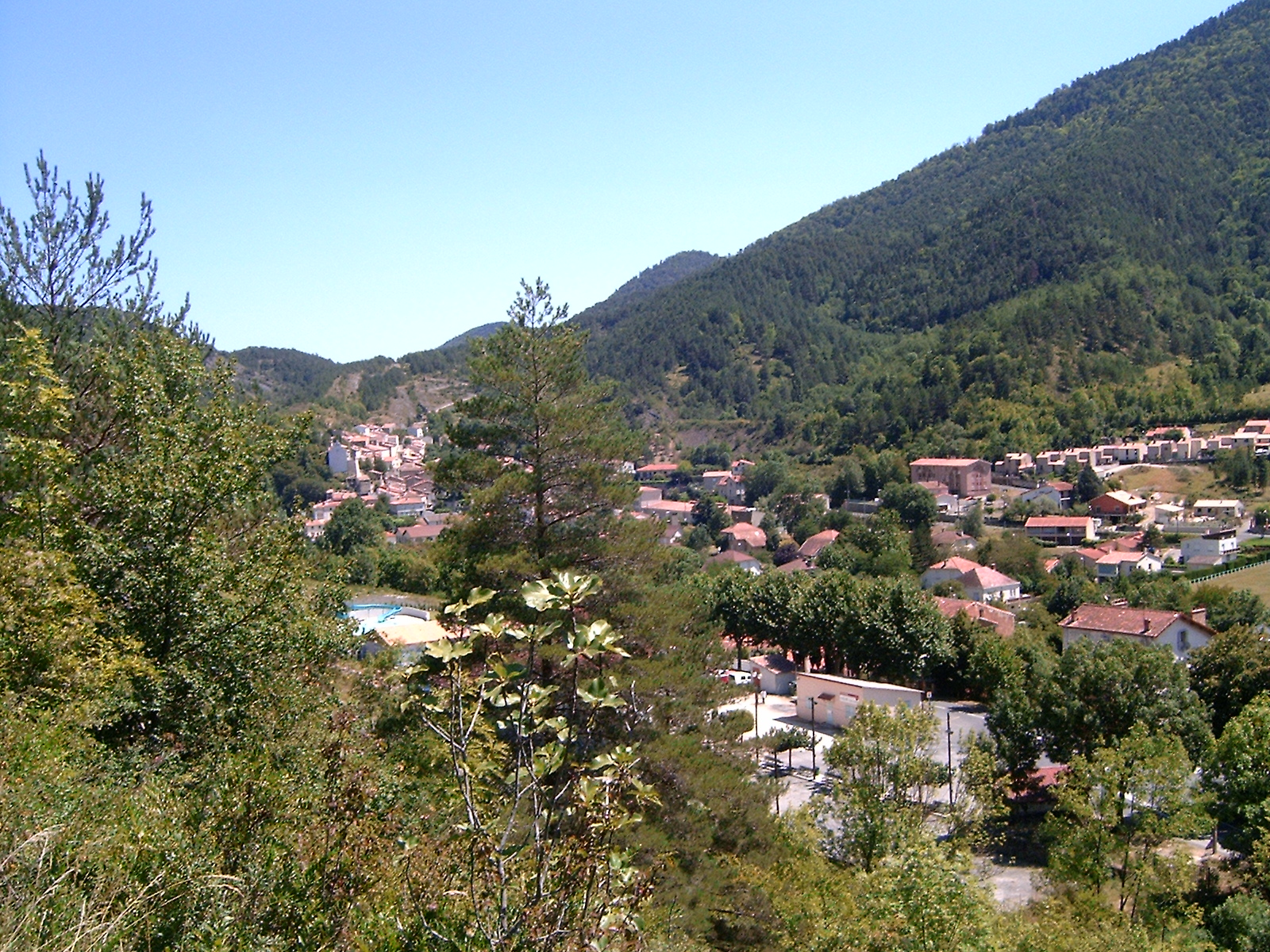
- A general view of Axat

- Coat of arms
- Location of Axat
- Location within France Location within Occitanie
- Coordinates: 42°48′16″N 2°14′10″E
- Country: France
- Region: Occitania
- Department: Aude
- Arrondissement: Limoux
- Canton: Quillan
- Intercommunality: CC Pyrénées Audoises

Government
  - Mayor (2020–2026): Philippe Parraud
- Area^{1}: 11.77 km^{2} (4.54 sq mi)
- Elevation: 398 m (1,306 ft)
- Highest elevation: 1,330 m (4,360 ft)
- Lowest elevation: 394 m (1,293 ft)
- Population (2023): 479
  - Density: 40.7/km^{2} (105/sq mi)
- Time zone: UTC+01:00 (CET)
  - Summer (DST): UTC+02:00 (CEST)
- INSEE/Postal code: 11021 /11140
- ^{1} French Land Register data, which excludes lakes, ponds, glaciers > 1 km^{2} (0.386 sq mi or 247 acres) and river estuaries.

Axat (French pronunciation: [aksat]; Atsat in Occitan) is a commune in the Aude department in the Occitanie region of southern France.

== Geography ==
Axat is located in Cathar country at the doors of the Aude Pyrenees some 45 km west by northwest of Perpignan and 10 km southeast of Quillan. Access to the commune is by the D117 road from Belvianes-et-Cavirac in the north which passes east through the top of the commune and continues to Caudiès-de-Fenouillèdes. Access to the village is by the D118 which branches from the D117 in the north of the commune and goes south to the village then continues south through the length of the commune before turning west to follow a mountain ridge to Puyvalador. The commune is alpine in nature with extensive forests and rugged terrain. The village is in a valley in the north of the commune.

Axat is a tourist town situated in the high valley of the Aude. Surrounded by mountains and gorges, the narrowest Gorge of Saint Georges is 3 km away. The River Aude is in a picturesque setting and is a popular whitewater sports location. There are 300 metres of fly fishing stretches where the quality of oxygen in the water attracts salmon and trout.

A privately owned tourist railway known as The Little Red Train (Train du pays Cathare et du Fenouillèdes), runs on part of the old Carcassonne to Rivesaltes via Quillan SNCF railway line, from a station just west of the village. In summer it links Axat to Rivesaltes passing through Saint-Paul-de-Fenouillet with 60 km of track running over impressive viaducts and through tunnels on open-air carriages. The former track between Axat and Quillan no longer exists.

The river Aude flows through the length of the commune from south to north then continues northwest at the start of its journey to the Mediterranean Sea. Many tributaries rise in the commune on both banks and flow into the Aude including the Ruisseau d'Artigues (which rises in Artigues), the Ruisseeau de Seilles, and many other unnamed streams.

== Toponymy ==
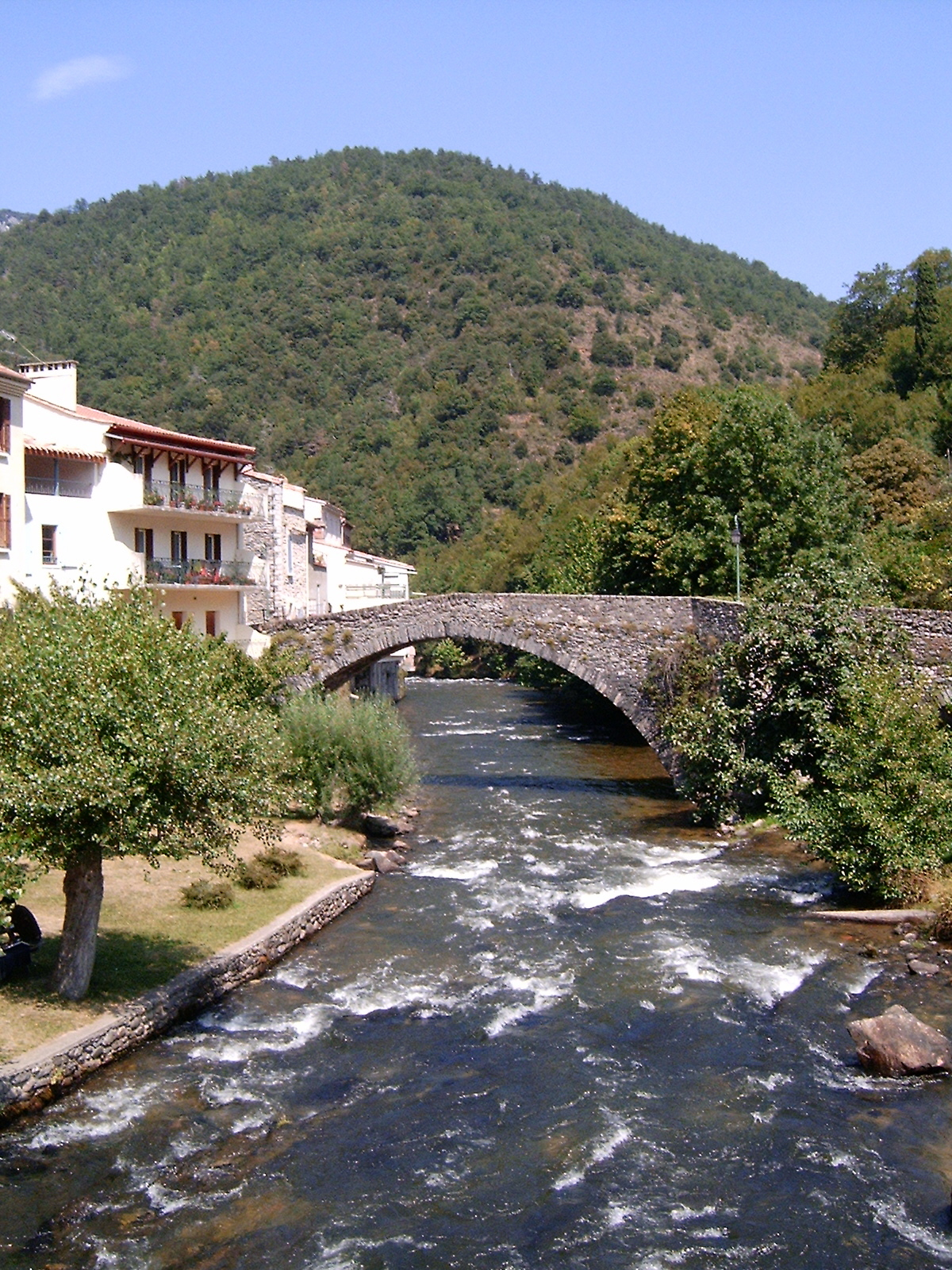
View of the Aude in Axat

In ancient times the Aude basin did not belong to the Sordones but to other iron producers inhabiting Atax country: the Atacini who made swords as well as axes. The nearest village to the Sordones and part of the land occupied by the Aticini was called Axat and this name, which is a simple inversion of Atax marks the exact point of division between the two tribes of Sordones and Atacini.

== History ==
The Barony became a Marquisate in 1776 according to Eric Thiou and was extinguished in 1788. It became a courtesy title borrowed by Philippe du Puy de Clinchamps.

=== Heraldry ===
Arms of Axat	Blazon: Argent, a fesse Vert, in chief three square lozenges the same.

== Administration ==
List of Successive Mayors

From	To	Name
1947	1971	Emile Gorse
1971	1983	Alexandre Raynaud
1983	1985	Jean Paul Raynaud
1985	1989	Yves Ipavec
1989	2020	Marcel Martinez
2020	2026	Philippe Parraud

== Demography ==
The inhabitants of the commune are known as Axatois or Axatoises in French.

Historical population

Year	Pop.	±% p.a.
1793	284	—
1821	411	+1.33%
1846	594	+1.48%
1872	452	−1.05%
1886	450	−0.03%
1901	838	+4.23%
1911	912	+0.85%
1921	863	−0.55%
1931	1,010	+1.59%
1946	930	−0.55%
1954	1,006	+0.99%

Year	Pop.	±% p.a.
1962	993	−0.16%
1968	997	+0.07%
1975	911	−1.28%
1982	1,021	+1.64%
1990	919	−1.31%
1999	832	−1.10%
2007	701	−2.12%
2012	623	−2.33%
2017	547	−2.57%
2023	479	−2.19%

Source: EHESS and INSEE

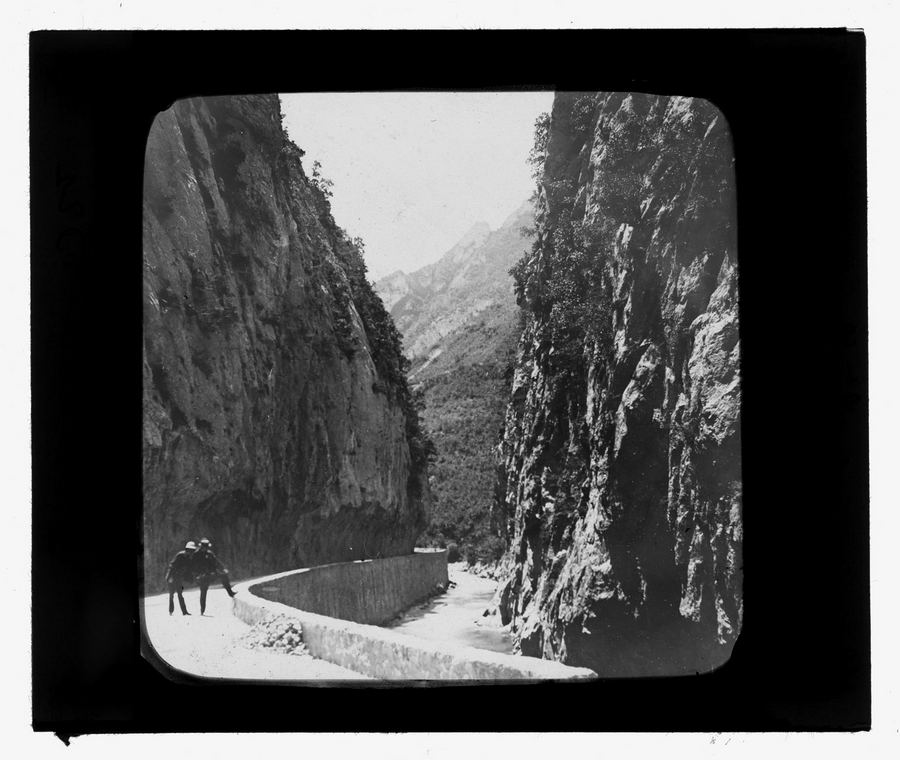
The Gorge of Saint Georges at the end of the 19th century

== Culture and heritage ==
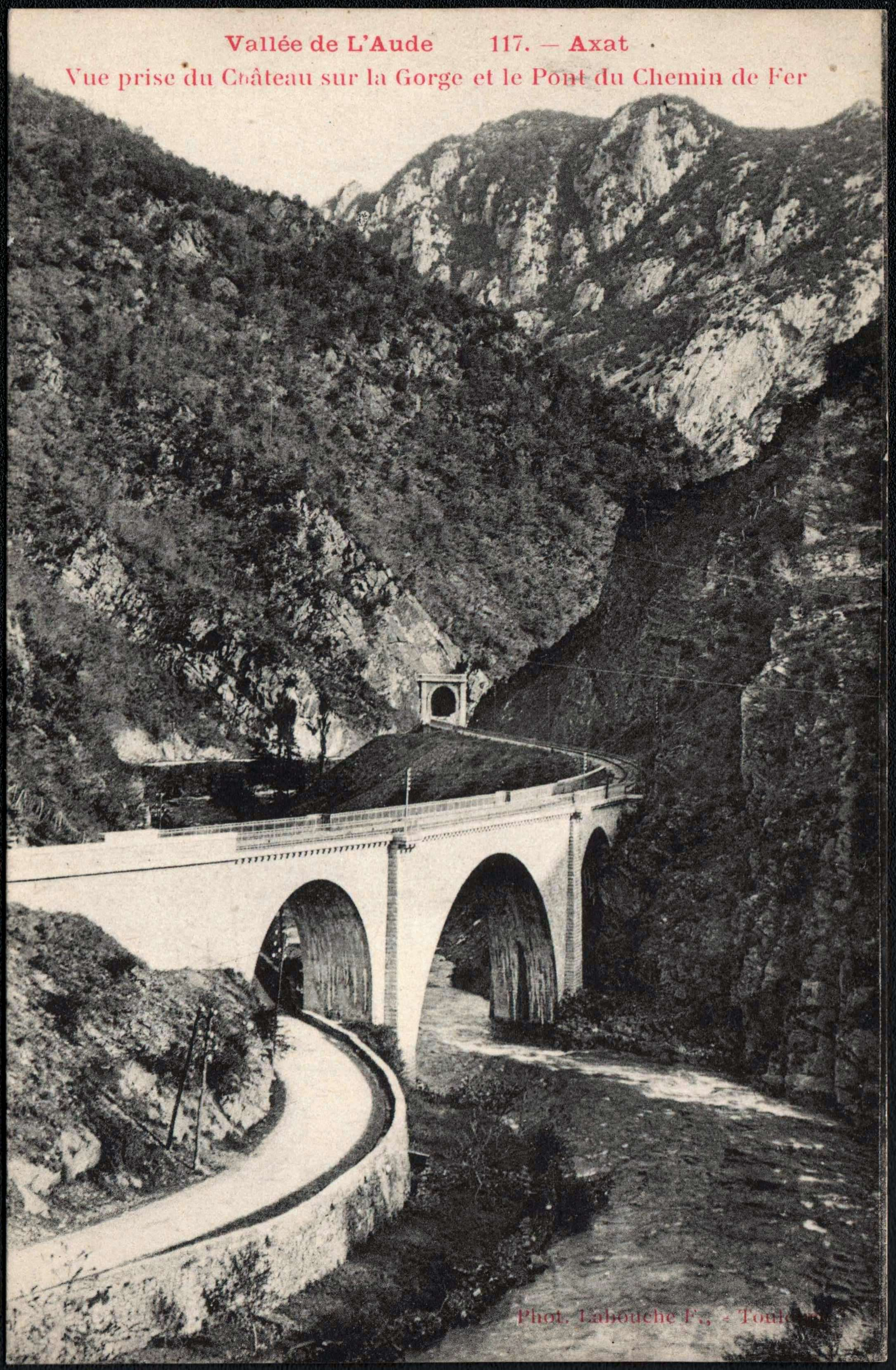
The railway viaduct in 1910

=== Civil heritage ===
- A Viaduct built in 1900
- A Bridge

=== Religious heritage ===
The Church of the Assumption of Notre-Dame, built in 1630, contains a Statue: the Immaculate Conception (17th century) which is registered as an historical object

The New Provisional Church contains several items that are registered as historical objects:

- A Statue: Saint John the Evangelist (17th century)
- A Statue: Virgin with pedestal (17th century)
- A Painting: Saint Michel vanquishing the demon (18th century)
- A Painting: The Assumption (18th century)

== Local life ==
=== Sports ===
- Water activities: rafting, whitewater swimming, canoeing
- Axat Football Club, a soccer club founded in 1940.
- Outdoor sports: hiking (walking, horse riding, mountain biking), climbing

There is also an outdoor swimming pool which is open from June to September with great mountain views.

== Notable people linked to the commune ==
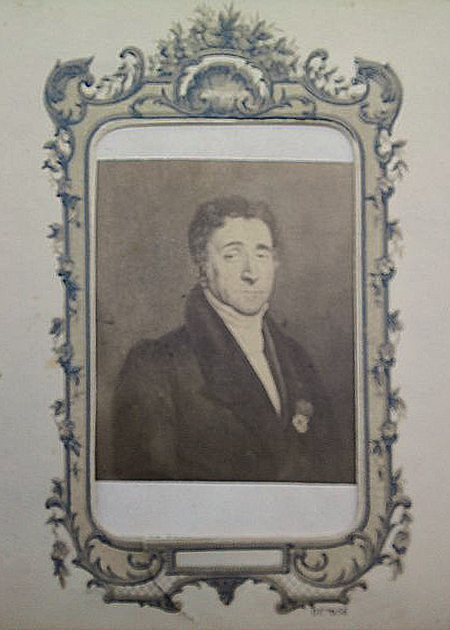
The Marquis of Dax of Axat (1767-1847)

- The Dax family, originally from Carcassonne, have been linked to Axat since the middle of the 15th century, when its members were Lords of Axat.
- Henri Rouzaud, born in Axat on 14 November 1855, died at Narbonne on 17 July 1935, professor and politician
- Albert Cauneille, born on 4 October 1910 in Axat. He was twice a finalist in the 1932–33 French Rugby Union Championship. He played centre three-quarters (he was 1.72m tall and weighed 82 kg). Clubs: Carcassonne and Narbonne.
- Henri Gleyzes, born on 18 May 1901 in Axat and died on 15 October 1969. He was a finalist in the 1924–25 French Rugby Union Championship with Carcassonne. He played wing three-quarter.
- Patrick David, born on 3 May 1954 in Axat. Rugby player. He was a finalist in the 1976–77 French Rugby Union Championship with Perpignan. He played prop (he was 1.83m tall and 87 kg).

== See also ==
- Communes of the Aude department
