= Col de la Quillane =

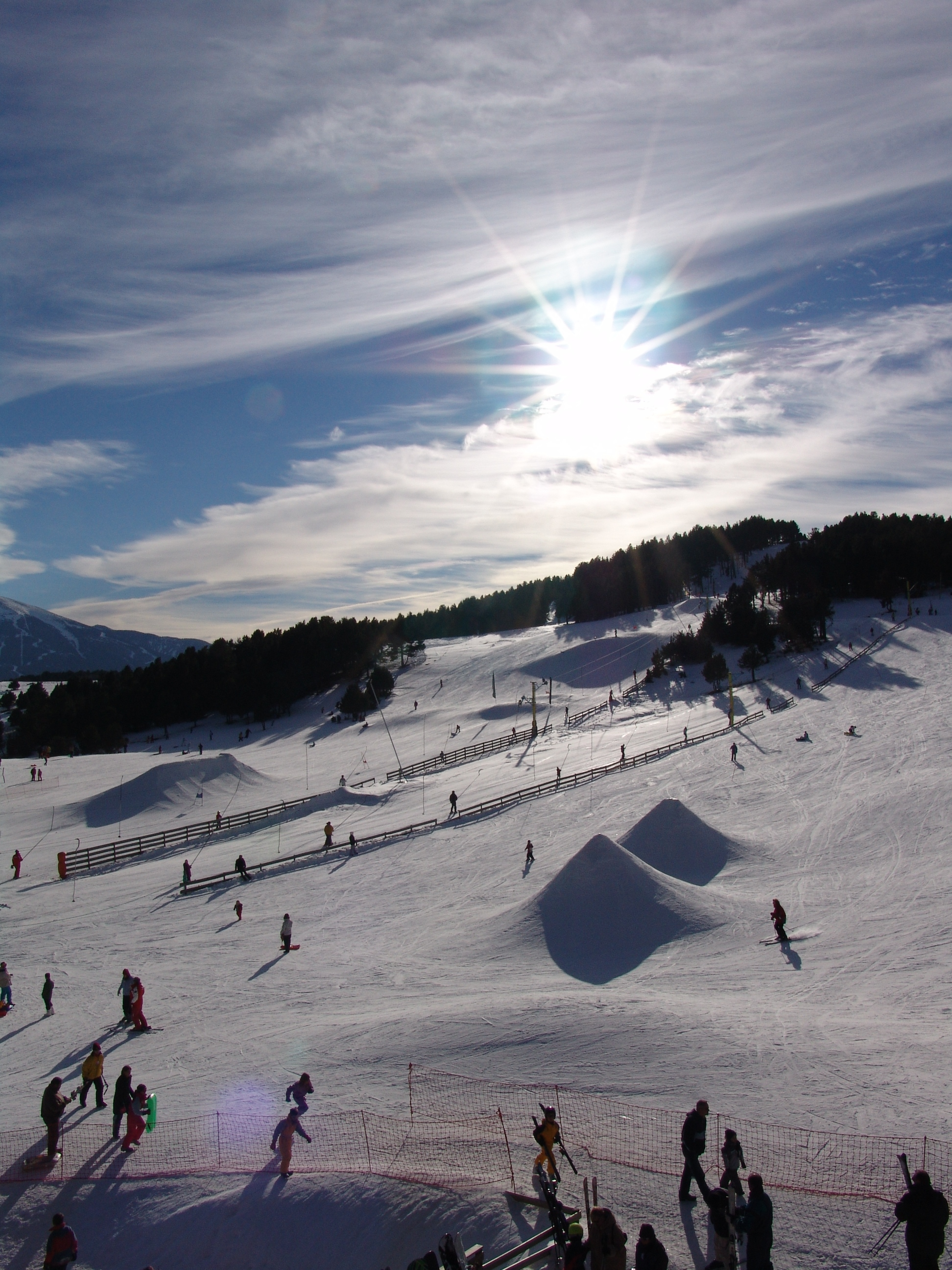
- The Col de la Quillane in winter

- Location within Pyrenees
- Elevation: 1,713 metres (5,620 ft)

Third Approach
- Location: Pyrénées-Orientales, France
- Range: Pyrenees
- Coordinates: 42°32′53″N 2°6′51″E

Col de la Quillane is a mountain pass in the Pyrenees on the border between La Llagonne and Matemale in Pyrénées-Orientales.

The Col de la Quillane marks the boundary of the watershed, with the Aude river on one side and the Têt river on the other.

It is from the Col de la Quillane that the businessman and Pyrenees explorer Prosper Auriol, and his friends, made the first skiing ever in the Pyrenees, on 29 January 1901.

At the Col de la Quillane nowadays can be found the small ski resort of La Quillane.

== See also ==
- List of mountain passes
