= Lac d'Aude =

Lake in France

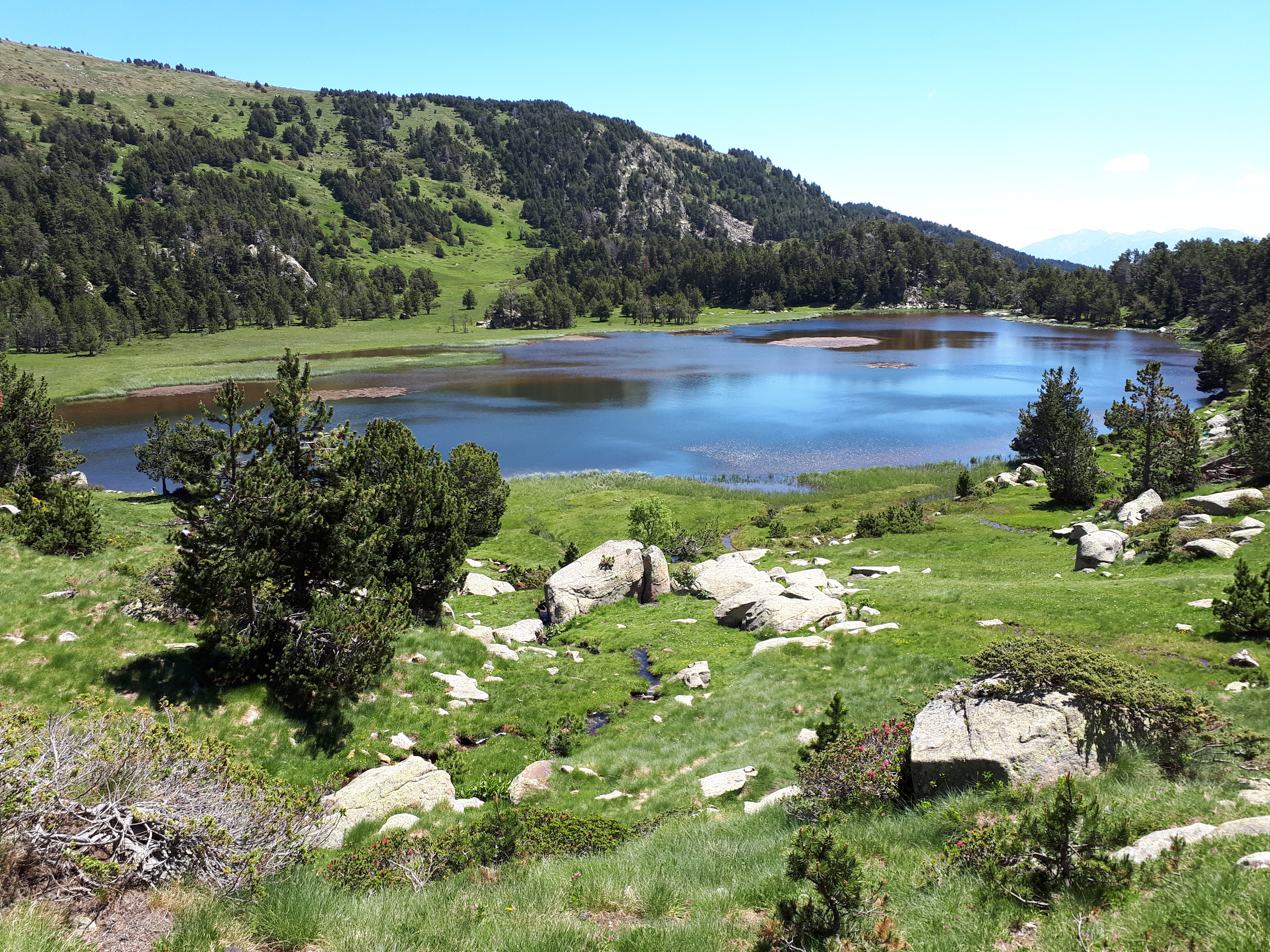

- Location within Pyrenees
- Location: Pyrénées-Orientales
- Coordinates: 42.569783°N 2.024574°E
- Primary outflows: Aude
- Basin countries: France
- Surface area: 0.03 km^{2} (0.012 sq mi)
- Surface elevation: 2,136 m (7,008 ft)

Lac d'Aude is a lake in Pyrénées-Orientales, France. At an elevation of 2,136 m, its surface area is 0.03 km^{2}.
