= Brenac =

Part of Quillan in Occitanie, France

- Part of Quillan
- Coat of arms
- Location of Brenac
- Location within France Location within Occitanie
- Coordinates: 42°53′31″N 2°09′15″E
- Country: France
- Region: Occitania
- Department: Aude
- Arrondissement: Limoux
- Canton: Quillan
- Commune: Quillan
- Area^{1}: 13.66 km^{2} (5.27 sq mi)
- Elevation: 410 m (1,350 ft)
- Highest elevation: 820 m (2,690 ft)
- Lowest elevation: 311 m (1,020 ft)
- Population (2023): 212
  - Density: 15.5/km^{2} (40.2/sq mi)
- Time zone: UTC+01:00 (CET)
  - Summer (DST): UTC+02:00 (CEST)
- Postal code: 11500
- ^{1} French Land Register data, which excludes lakes, ponds, glaciers > 1 km^{2} (0.386 sq mi or 247 acres) and river estuaries.

Brenac (French pronunciation: [bʁənak]) is a former commune in the Aude department in southern France. On 1 January 2016, it was merged into the commune of Quillan.

== See also ==
- Communes of the Aude department
