= Quillan =

Commune in Occitanie, France

- Commune
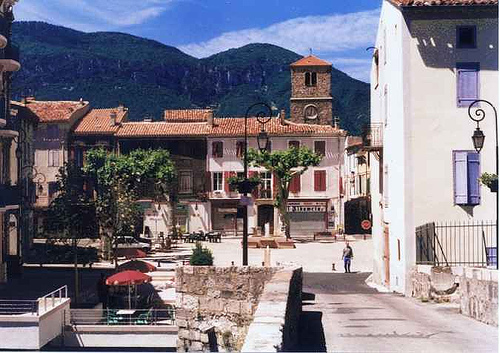
- Place de la République

- Coat of arms
- Location of Quillan
- Location within France Location within Occitanie
- Coordinates: 42°52′34″N 2°10′57″E
- Country: France
- Region: Occitania
- Department: Aude
- Arrondissement: Limoux
- Canton: La Haute-Vallée de l'Aude

Government
  - Mayor (2020–2026): Pierre Castel
- Area^{1}: 34.63 km^{2} (13.37 sq mi)
- Elevation: 291 m (955 ft)
- Highest elevation: 1,122 m (3,681 ft)
- Lowest elevation: 261 m (856 ft)
- Population (2023): 2,978
  - Density: 85.99/km^{2} (222.7/sq mi)
- Time zone: UTC+01:00 (CET)
  - Summer (DST): UTC+02:00 (CEST)
- INSEE/Postal code: 11304 /11500
- ^{1} French Land Register data, which excludes lakes, ponds, glaciers > 1 km^{2} (0.386 sq mi or 247 acres) and river estuaries.

Quillan (French pronunciation: [kijɑ̃]; Languedocien: Quilhan) is a commune in the Aude department in southern France. On 1 January 2016, the former commune of Brenac was merged into Quillan.

== Geography ==
Quillan is located at the foothills of the Pyrenees, on the road between Carcassonne and Perpignan. The River Aude runs through the town. At the base of the mountains, fields of sunflowers and vineyards straddle the roads with snow-capped peaks in the distance.

The beaches of the Mediterranean are about an hour away. In the other direction, Carcassonne is a 45-minute drive, while Toulouse is one and a half hours away. Quillan is a medium-sized town 6 km from Espéraza, neighbouring the commune of Ginoles.

== History ==
Historically, Quillan was a stopping point on the ancient and winding road between Carcassonne and Perpignan. The River Aude traditionally carried timber and other local products to Carcassonne and the Canal du Midi. The town was particularly noted for hat making, and then later, the production of formica.

With the construction of the toll-road joining Carcassonne to Perpignan via Narbonne, the town has moved away from production towards eco-tourism, tourism and outdoor pursuits such as rambling, biking, kayaking, rafting and walking. The surrounding area is rich in geographical and historical interest including many Cathar castles.

== Population ==
Population data refer to the commune in its geography as of January 2025.

Historical population
Year	Pop.	±% p.a.
1968	5,052	—
1975	5,168	+0.32%
1982	4,663	−1.46%
1990	4,031	−1.80%
1999	3,745	−0.81%
2007	3,605	−0.48%
2012	3,448	−0.89%
2017	3,258	−1.13%
2023	2,978	−1.49%
Source: INSEE

== Economy ==
The town and surrounding villages are largely agricultural, producing milk, grapes, wine (including the Blanquette de Limoux), wheat, sunflowers, eggs and meat from poultry and cows. In the last few years, tourism has increased and during the warmer months many tourists flock to Quillan and its surroundings for outdoor activities, cultural events, and restaurants. There are many bed-and-breakfasts and rentals.

== Culture ==
From 1996 to 2014, a week-long Folklore Festival was held in August where dancers, musicians and singers from 10 or 12 different countries perform during the day and evening on the town square of Quillan.

It is popular for whitewater rafting, canoeing, fishing and kayaking on the river Aude and other outdoor activities including cycling, hiking and running.

== Transportation ==
There is a 1 euro bus/train that goes from Quillan to Carcassonne and from Quillan to Perpignan, each day. The railway line from Carcassonne stops in Limoux and Espéraza but some train services have been replaced by buses. Using this service, it's about 50 minutes to Carcassonne and about 1.25 hours to Perpignan. From Perpignan it's an easy short train to Barcelona or up to Narbonne and the TGV lines that depart from the South of France. By car, Quillan is 45 minutes from Carcassonne and one and a half hours from Toulouse.

== See also ==
- Corbières Massif
- Communes of the Aude department
