= Floure =

Commune in Occitanie, France

- Commune
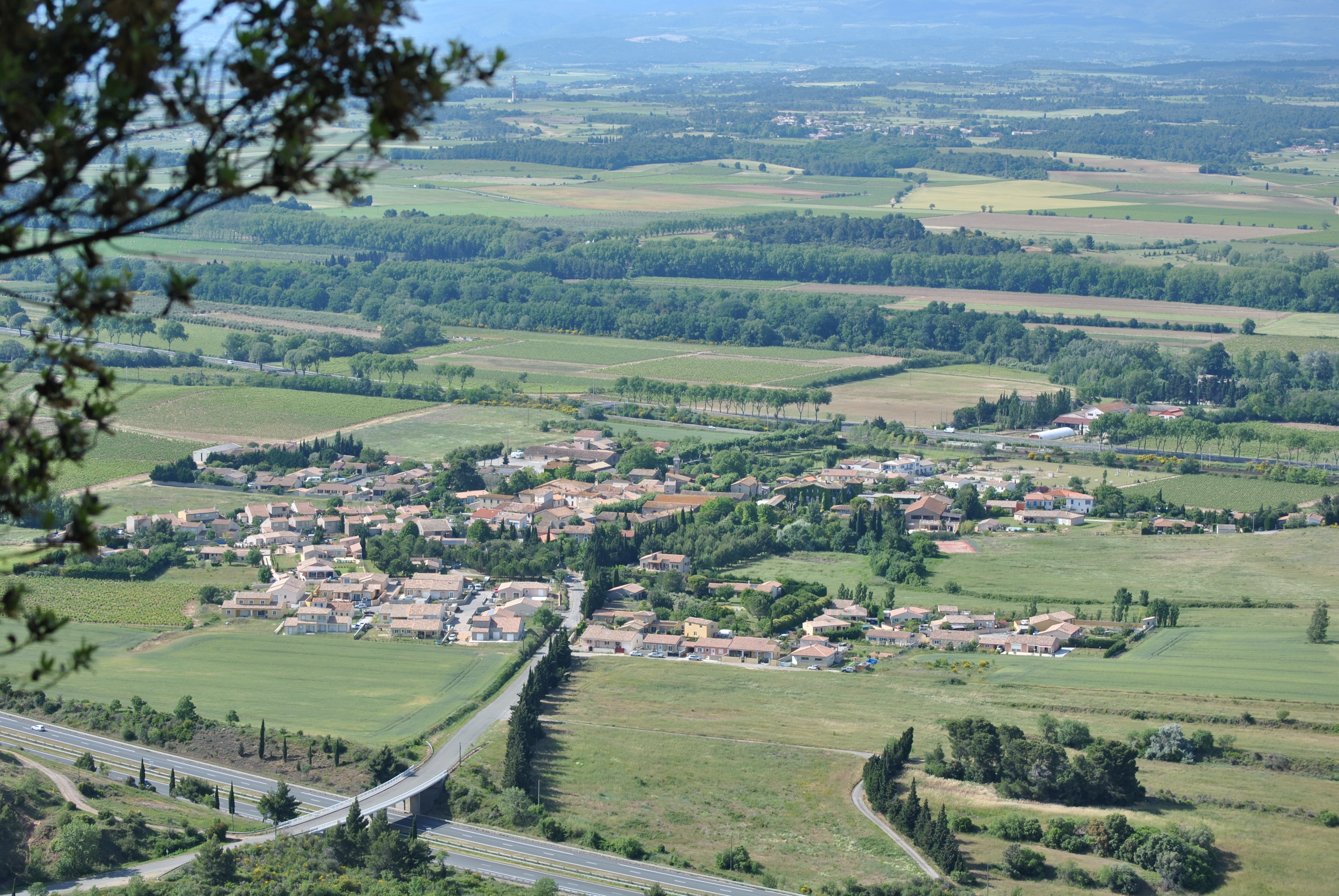
- A general view of Floure

- Coat of arms
- Location of Floure
- Location within France Location within Occitanie
- Coordinates: 43°11′02″N 2°29′27″E
- Country: France
- Region: Occitania
- Department: Aude
- Arrondissement: Carcassonne
- Canton: La Montagne d'Alaric
- Intercommunality: Carcassonne Agglo

Government
  - Mayor (2020–2026): Pierre Micheau
- Area^{1}: 4.25 km^{2} (1.64 sq mi)
- Elevation: 77 m (253 ft)
- Highest elevation: 384 m (1,260 ft)
- Lowest elevation: 69 m (226 ft)
- Population (2023): 405
  - Density: 95.3/km^{2} (247/sq mi)
- Time zone: UTC+01:00 (CET)
  - Summer (DST): UTC+02:00 (CEST)
- INSEE/Postal code: 11146 /11800
- ^{1} French Land Register data, which excludes lakes, ponds, glaciers > 1 km^{2} (0.386 sq mi or 247 acres) and river estuaries.

Floure (French pronunciation: [fluʁ]; Occitan: Flora) is a commune in the Aude department in southern France. The journalist and writer Gaston Bonheur (1913–1980) is buried in Floure where he owned the castle.

== Population ==
Historical population
Year	Pop.	±% p.a.
1968	138	—
1975	137	−0.10%
1982	260	+9.58%
1990	255	−0.24%
1999	318	+2.48%
2007	356	+1.42%
2012	391	+1.89%
2017	407	+0.81%
2023	405	−0.08%
Source: INSEE

== See also ==
- Corbières AOC
- Communes of the Aude department
