= Lady Chatterley's Lover (1955 film) =

L'Amant de lady Chatterley
- Directed by: Marc Allégret
- Written by: Philippe de Rothschild (play); Gaston Bonheur
- Screenplay by: Marc Allégret
- Based on: Lady Chatterley's Lover
- Produced by: Gilbert Cohen-Seat; Claude Ganz
- Starring: Danielle Darrieux; Leo Genn; Erno Crisa
- Cinematography: Georges Périnal
- Edited by: Suzanne de Troeye
- Music by: Joseph Kosma
- Production companies: Orsay Films; Régie du Film
- Distributed by: Columbia Pictures (France); Kingsley-International Pictures (US)
- Release dates: 12 May 1955 (France); 21 July 1959 (U.S.)
- Running time: 101 minutes
- Country: France
- Language: French

Lady Chatterley's Lover (French: L'Amant de lady Chatterley) is a 1955 French drama film directed by Marc Allégret who co-wrote screenplay with Philippe de Rothschild and Gaston Bonheur, based on the 1928 novel by D. H. Lawrence. In 1955, the film was banned in New York because it "promoted adultery", but it was released in 1959 after the U.S. Supreme Court reversed a lower court's decision.

Of the six film adaptations of Lady Chatterley's Lover (two French, two British, and two American) this is the only one to be produced before the legal publication of the unexpurgated edition in 1960. Thus, the producers had only the censored version to work with. The film has a more optimistic ending than Lawrence's book.

== Cast ==
- Danielle Darrieux as Constance Chatterley
- Erno Crisa as Oliver Mellors
- Leo Genn as Sir Clifford Chatterley
- Berthe Tissen as Mrs. Bolton
- Janine Crispin as Hilda
- Jean Murat as Baron Leslie Winter
- Gérard Séty as Michaelis
- Jacqueline Noëlle as Bertha Mellors

== See also ==
- Lady Chatterley's Lover (1981)
- Lady Chatterley (1993)
- Lady Chatterley (2006)
