= Gaston Bonheur =

French journalist and writer (1913–1980)

- Born: Gaston Tesseyre; 27 November 1913; Belvianes (Aude)
- Died: 4 September 1980 (aged 66); Montpellier (Hérault)
- Occupations: Journalist; Poet

Gaston Bonheur, pseudonym for Gaston Tesseyre (27 November 1913 – 4 September 1980) was a French journalist and writer. He is known for writing the screenplay for the 1955 film version of Lady Chatterley's Lover.

== Biography ==
Gaston Tesseyre's parents were teachers. His father was killed at the very beginning of the First World War and when Gaston was an infant. The future writer learned the Occitan language and the art of winemaking from his grandmother Bonhoure, from whom he also took his pen name.

First a poet, close to the surrealists, he founded the magazine "Choc". He then moved on to journalism. He was hired by fr:Pierre Lazareff as chief reporter for the daily Paris-Soir. In 1947 he was editor-in-chief at the weekly Paris Match and in 1948, editor-in-chief of the daily Paris-Presse. For several years he was the director of the press empire of Jean Prouvost which included the publications Télé 7 Jours, Le Figaro, Paris Match, and France-Soir.

He also wrote songs. His book "Qui a cassé le vase de Soissons?", which enjoyed wide popular acclaim in the 1960's, is a half-sarcastic, half-nostalgic recollection of his mother as a schoolteacher.

Bonheur is buried in Floure Cemetery (Aude).

== Works ==
- Chemin privé (poems),
- 1934: La Mauvaise fréquentation, Éditions Gallimard
- 1937: Les Garçons
- 1940: La Cavalcade héroïque, Fayard
- 1945: Le Glaive nu, éd. Les Trois Collines
- 1953: Tournebelle
- 1958: Charles de Gaulle, Gallimard
- 1963: Qui a cassé le vase de Soissons ?, Robert Laffont
- 1965: La République nous appelle, Robert Laffont
- 1965: Rue des Rosiers (song performed by Régine), Pathé
- 1970: Qui a cassé le pot au lait ? , Robert Laffont
- 1970: Si le Midi avait voulu, Robert Laffont
- 1974: Notre patrie gauloise, Robert Laffont
- 1976: La Croix de ma mère, Éditions Julliard
- 1977: Henri Quatre
- 1978: Le Soleil oblique, éd. Julliard
- 1980: L'Ardoise et la craie, Éditions de la Table ronde
- 1980: Paris bonheur, éd. Richer
