= Ginoles =

Commune in Occitanie, France

- Commune
- Location of Ginoles
- Location within France Location within Occitanie
- Coordinates: 42°52′09″N 2°09′34″E
- Country: France
- Region: Occitania
- Department: Aude
- Arrondissement: Limoux
- Canton: La Haute-Vallée de l'Aude

Government
  - Mayor (2020–2026): Daniel Calvi
- Area^{1}: 6.17 km^{2} (2.38 sq mi)
- Elevation: 350 m (1,150 ft)
- Highest elevation: 1,000 m (3,300 ft)
- Lowest elevation: 307 m (1,007 ft)
- Population (2023): 296
  - Density: 48.0/km^{2} (124/sq mi)
- Time zone: UTC+01:00 (CET)
  - Summer (DST): UTC+02:00 (CEST)
- INSEE/Postal code: 11165 /11500
- ^{1} French Land Register data, which excludes lakes, ponds, glaciers > 1 km^{2} (0.386 sq mi or 247 acres) and river estuaries.

Ginoles (French pronunciation: [ʒinɔl]; Occitan: Ginòlas) is a commune in the Aude department in southern France. It lies immediately to the west of Quillan. Both of these communes are known for their luxurious holiday homes.

The origins of Ginoles are definitely very old and certainly predate the Gallo-Roman era. There are references in ancient texts to Castrum Ginolis, and its thermal springs. The presence of these natural hot springs almost certainly attracted people to this region, which in turn brought agriculture. Due to the sunny climate, since Roman times the cultivation of olives was an important activity, and many retaining walls called 'terraces' were built on the mountainsides and are still visible especially when one is in the village.

Ginoles is also known for its orchards. In the nearby locality named “Prat Fa” it is said that once there was a “Fanum” there which is a small rural temple of antiquity.

Ginoles had a successful period, with the opening of the Spa which had two hot springs named Prosper and Rosita, located down the hill at Ginoles Les Bains; these have since closed.

== Population ==
Historical population
| Year | Pop. | ±% p.a. |
|---|---|---|
| 1968 | 194 | — |
| 1975 | 263 | +4.44% |
| 1982 | 297 | +1.75% |
| 1990 | 357 | +2.33% |
| 1999 | 349 | −0.25% |
| 2007 | 369 | +0.70% |
| 2012 | 364 | −0.27% |
| 2017 | 303 | −3.60% |
| 2023 | 296 | −0.39% |
Source: INSEE

== See also ==
- Communes of the Aude department
