= Caudiès-de-Fenouillèdes =

Caudiès-de-Fenouillèdes Caudiers de Fenollet Caudièrs de Fenolhet
- Commune
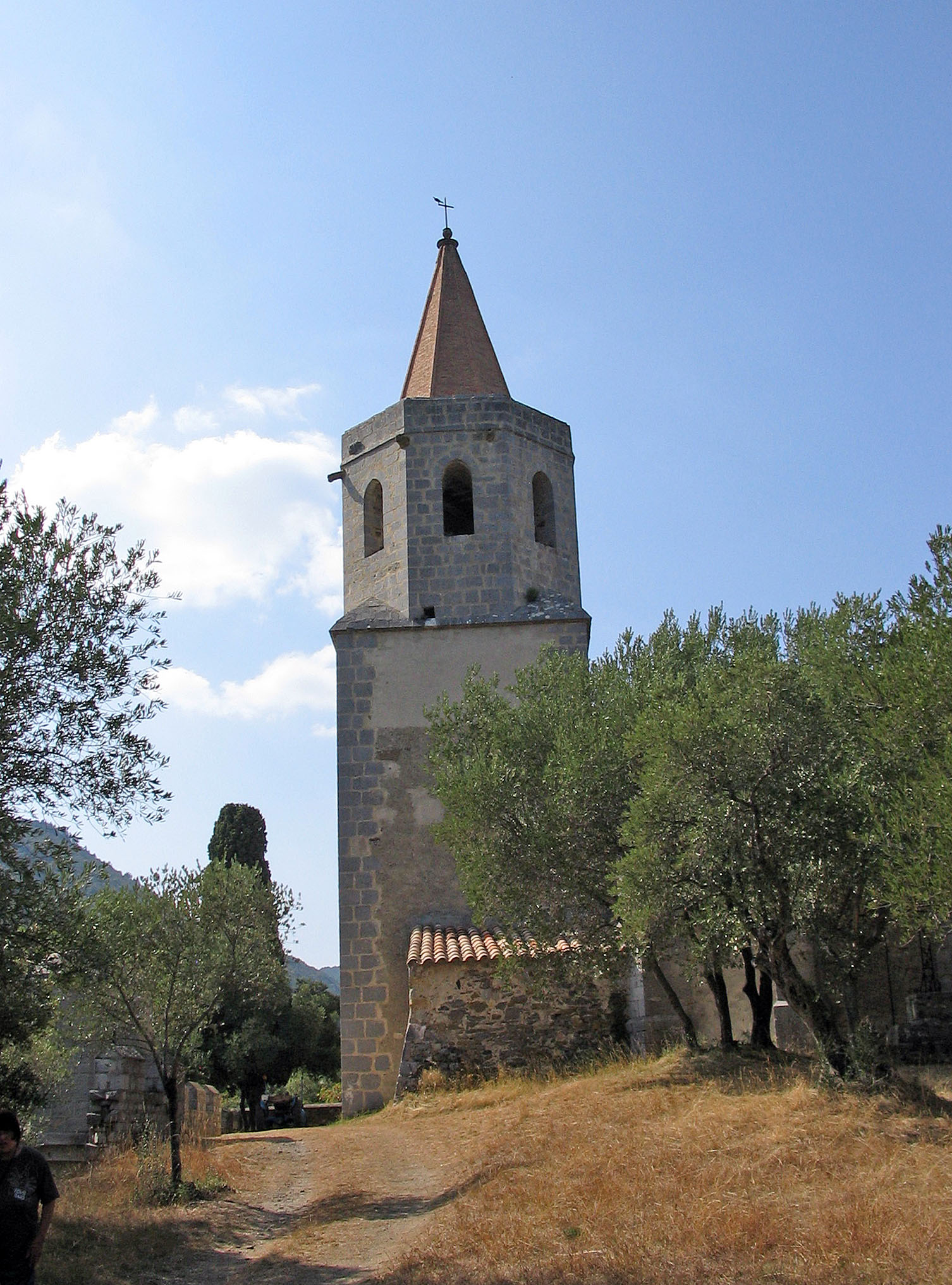
- The church of Our Lady of Laval, near Caudiès-de-Fenouillèdes

- Coat of arms
- Location of Caudiès-de-Fenouillèdes
- Location within France Location within Occitanie
- Coordinates: 42°48′46″N 2°22′35″E
- Country: France
- Region: Occitania
- Department: Pyrénées-Orientales
- Arrondissement: Prades
- Canton: La Vallée de l'Agly
- Intercommunality: Agly Fenouillèdes

Government
  - Mayor (2020–2026): Toussainte Calabrèse
- Area^{1}: 36.45 km^{2} (14.07 sq mi)
- Elevation: 347 m (1,138 ft)
- Highest elevation: 1,000 m (3,300 ft)
- Lowest elevation: 279 m (915 ft)
- Population (2023): 586
  - Density: 16.1/km^{2} (41.6/sq mi)
- Time zone: UTC+01:00 (CET)
  - Summer (DST): UTC+02:00 (CEST)
- INSEE/Postal code: 66046 /66220
- ^{1} French Land Register data, which excludes lakes, ponds, glaciers > 1 km^{2} (0.386 sq mi or 247 acres) and river estuaries.

Caudiès-de-Fenouillèdes (French pronunciation: [kodjɛs də fənujɛd], lit. 'Caudiès of Fenouillèdes'; Occitan: Caudièrs de Fenolhet) is a commune in the Pyrénées-Orientales department in southern France.

== Geography ==
=== Localisation ===
Caudiès-de-Fenouillèdes is located in the canton of La Vallée de l'Agly and in the arrondissement of Perpignan.

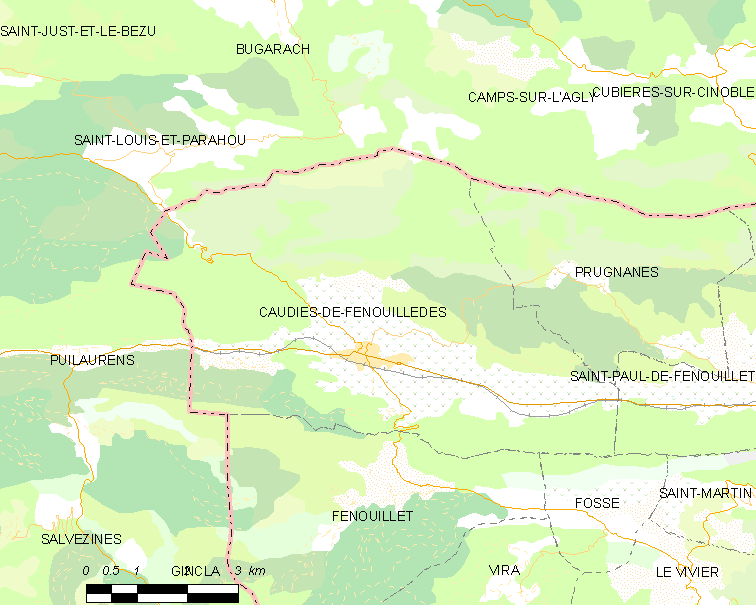
Map of Caudiès-de-Fenouillèdes and its surrounding communes

== Toponymy ==
The name of the town in Occitan is Caudiers de Fenolledès (historical form), de Fenolhedés (normalized form) or de Fenolhet (by similarity with other nearby communes).

The name first appears in 1011 as Caldarios. It is then written as Cauders in the 14th century, and then Caudies from the 15th to the 17th centuries, and then as Caudiers or Caudiès in modern Occitan.

In French, the official name is Caudiès in 1790, when the village becomes a commune, even though the names of Caudiès-de-Fenouillèdes or Caudiès-de-Saint-Paul were already in use. Caudiès-de-Saint-Paul is used until the end of the 19th century, but the town officially changes its name on 31 January 1898 to Caudiès-de-Fenouillèdes, still in use nowadays.

The name comes from the Latin caldarius, meaning cauldron, as can be seen on the local coat of arms, and may refer to nearby pit caves around the river Boulzane.

== Population ==
Historical population
Year	Pop.	±% p.a.
1968	792	—
1975	677	−2.22%
1982	618	−1.29%
1990	580	−0.79%
1999	598	+0.34%
2007	586	−0.25%
2012	642	+1.84%
2017	618	−0.76%
2023	586	−0.88%
Source: INSEE

== Sites of interest ==
- The church of Our Lady of Laval.
- The ruins of the castle of Castel Fizel (Catalan: Castellfisel).
- The curious bridge of the Saint-Louis pass.

== See also ==
- Communes of the Pyrénées-Orientales department
