= Espéraza =

Commune in Occitanie, France

- Commune
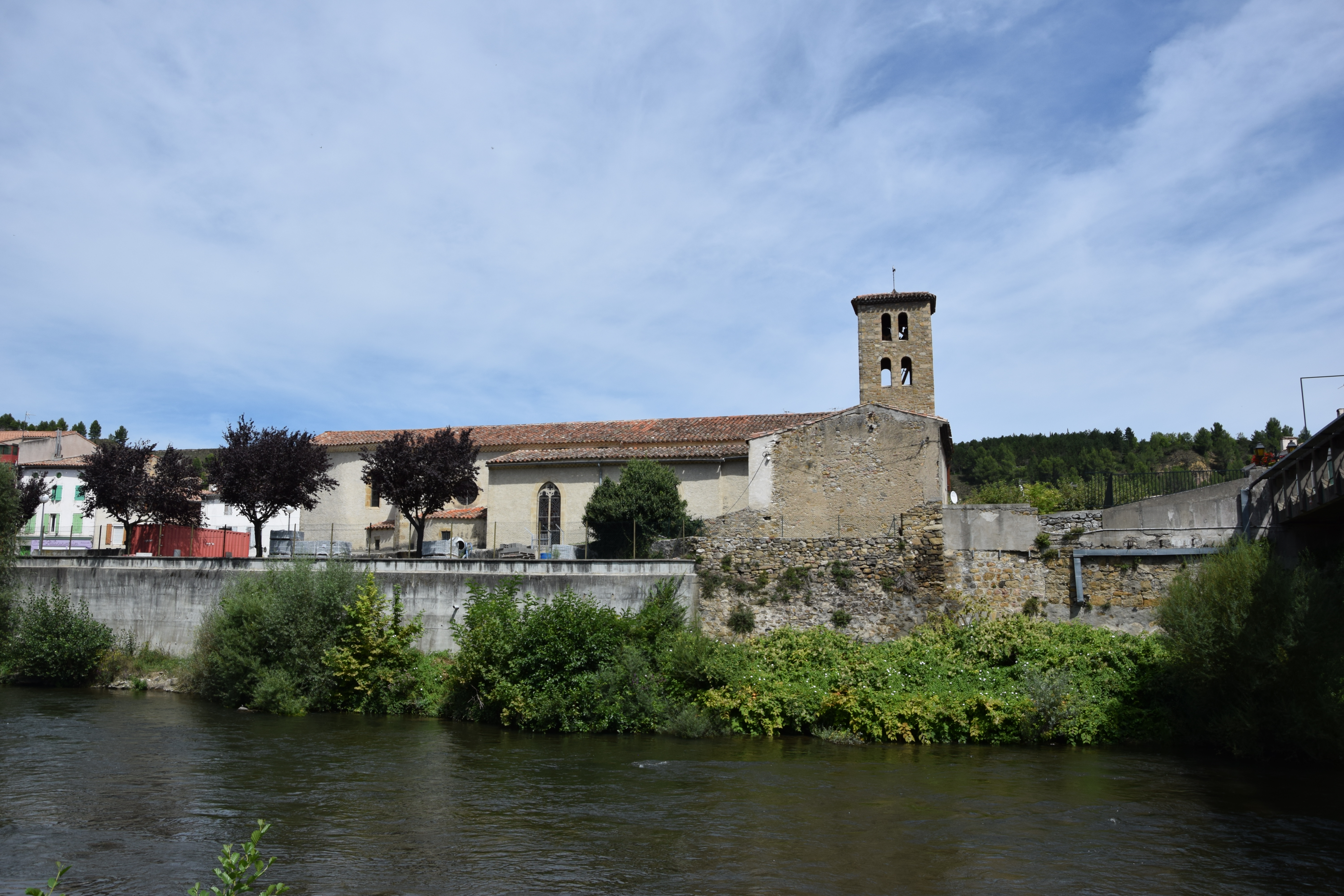
- The church in Espéraza

- Coat of arms
- Location of Espéraza
- Location within France Location within Occitanie
- Coordinates: 42°56′10″N 2°13′17″E
- Country: France
- Region: Occitania
- Department: Aude
- Arrondissement: Limoux
- Canton: La Haute-Vallée de l'Aude

Government
  - Mayor (2020–2026): Christian Soula
- Area^{1}: 10.52 km^{2} (4.06 sq mi)
- Elevation: 244 m (801 ft)
- Highest elevation: 480 m (1,570 ft)
- Lowest elevation: 229 m (751 ft)
- Population (2023): 1,774
  - Density: 168.6/km^{2} (436.8/sq mi)
- Time zone: UTC+01:00 (CET)
  - Summer (DST): UTC+02:00 (CEST)
- INSEE/Postal code: 11129 /11260
- ^{1} French Land Register data, which excludes lakes, ponds, glaciers > 1 km^{2} (0.386 sq mi or 247 acres) and river estuaries.

Espéraza (French pronunciation: [ɛspeʁaza]; Occitan: Esperasan) is a commune in the Aude department in southern France.

It lies on the Aude just north of the foothills of the Pyrenees.

== Population ==
Historical population
Year	Pop.	±% p.a.
1968	2,766	—
1975	2,529	−1.27%
1982	2,512	−0.10%
1990	2,250	−1.37%
1999	2,129	−0.61%
2007	2,138	+0.05%
2012	2,044	−0.90%
2017	1,870	−1.76%
2023	1,774	−0.87%
Source: INSEE

== History ==
- The church was built during the 13th century.
- One of the old pilgrimage routes to Santiago de Compostela passes this way, through the mountains and on into Spain.
- In the early 20th century, Espéraza was known for hat making. The town has a Hat Making Museum. Around 1815, the village experienced a considerable economic growth thanks to Bugarach hatters who settled there. First in 1830 and then in 1878 Espéraza enjoyed a prosperous period due to headwear, encouraged by the arrival of the railway. By 1929, there were 3000 Espéraza workers and 14 factories which allowed the village to become the second largest manufacturer of felt hats in the world (after Monza, Italy). But fashion had a terrible impact on the garment industry: the hat was worn less and less in the mid-20th century and Espéraza plunged into an economic depression. Now all that remains of the 14 Espéraza hat factories is a museum after the last factory burned down in 2002, although some have been converted to housing.
- Since the late 20th century, Espéraza has become known for dinosaur fossil bones and eggs discovered in the area. These discoveries began at the end of the 19th century and excavations continue today and new species of dinosaurs continue to be found. Dinosauria, the local museum, exhibits these fossils along with life size reconstructions of dinosaurs.

== See also ==
- Corbières Massif
- Communes of the Aude department
