= Olonzac =

- Commune
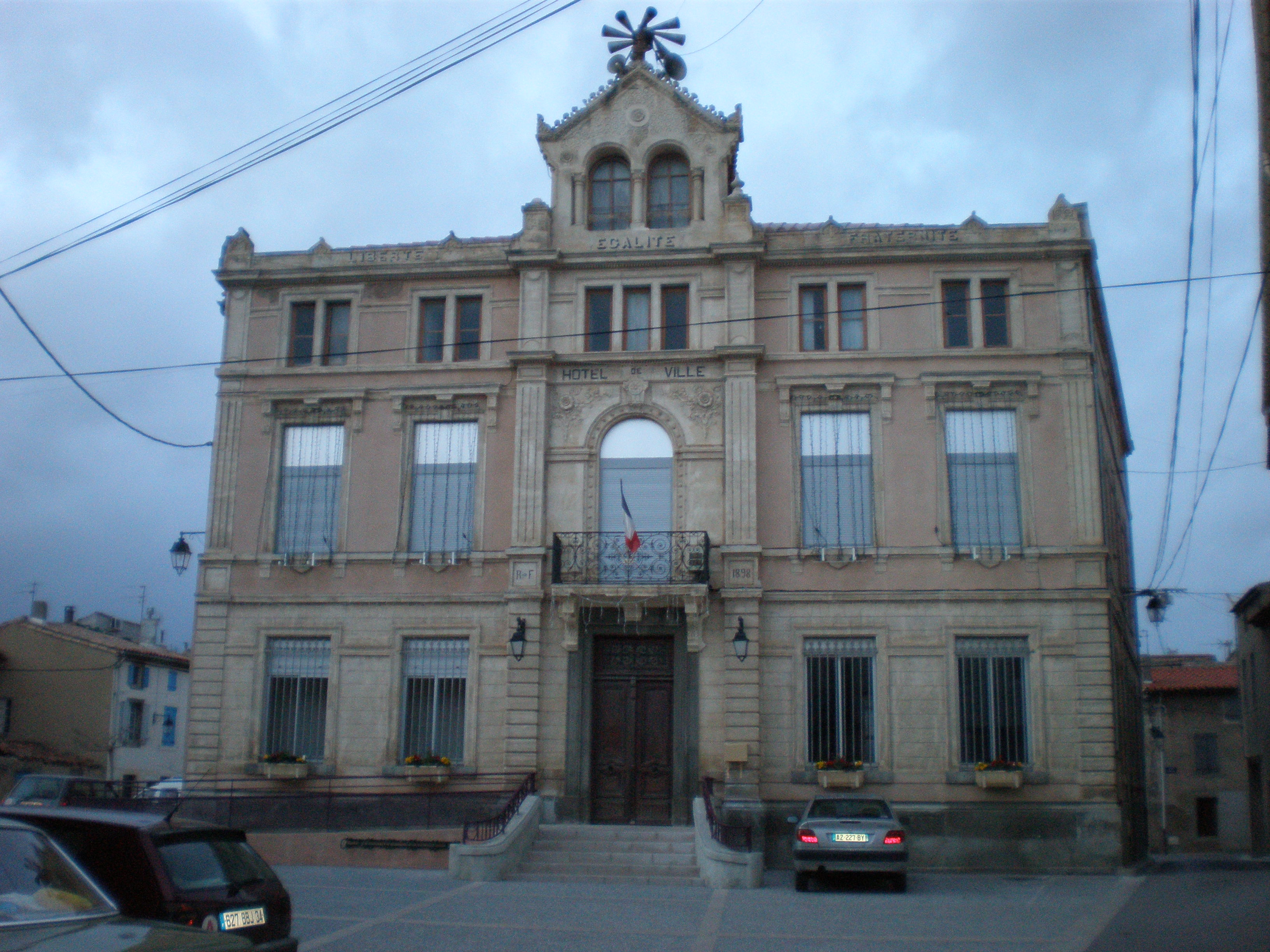
- Town hall

- Coat of arms
- Location of Olonzac
- Location within France Location within Occitanie
- Coordinates: 43°17′04″N 2°43′54″E
- Country: France
- Region: Occitania
- Department: Hérault
- Arrondissement: Béziers
- Canton: Saint-Pons-de-Thomières

Government
  - Mayor (2020–2026): Luc Louis
- Area^{1}: 18.95 km^{2} (7.32 sq mi)
- Elevation: 48 m (157 ft)
- Highest elevation: 182 m (597 ft)
- Lowest elevation: 29 m (95 ft)
- Population (2023): 1,693
  - Density: 89.34/km^{2} (231.4/sq mi)
- Time zone: UTC+01:00 (CET)
  - Summer (DST): UTC+02:00 (CEST)
- INSEE/Postal code: 34189 /34210
- ^{1} French Land Register data, which excludes lakes, ponds, glaciers > 1 km^{2} (0.386 sq mi or 247 acres) and river estuaries.

Olonzac (French pronunciation: [ɔlɔ̃zak]; Occitan: Lonzac) is a commune in the Hérault department in the Occitanie region in southern France.

It is known as the "capital of the Minervois".

== Village life ==
A market is held in the town every Tuesday.

There are several cafes in the town and shops including a Post Office and pharmacy.

The schools are Ecole Maternelle Henri Matisse and Ecole Elementaire Jean-Pierre Malric, both located by "La Condamine", and College Antoine Faure, located west of the park.

There is a large park east of the town centre, a boulodrome and tennis courts.

== Population ==
Historical population
Year	Pop.	±% p.a.
1968	1,856	—
1975	1,705	−1.20%
1982	1,633	−0.61%
1990	1,569	−0.50%
1999	1,568	−0.01%
2007	1,647	+0.62%
2012	1,739	+1.09%
2017	1,770	+0.35%
2023	1,693	−0.74%
Source: INSEE

== See also ==
- Communes of the Hérault department
