= Puyvalador =

Puyvalador Puigbalador
- Commune
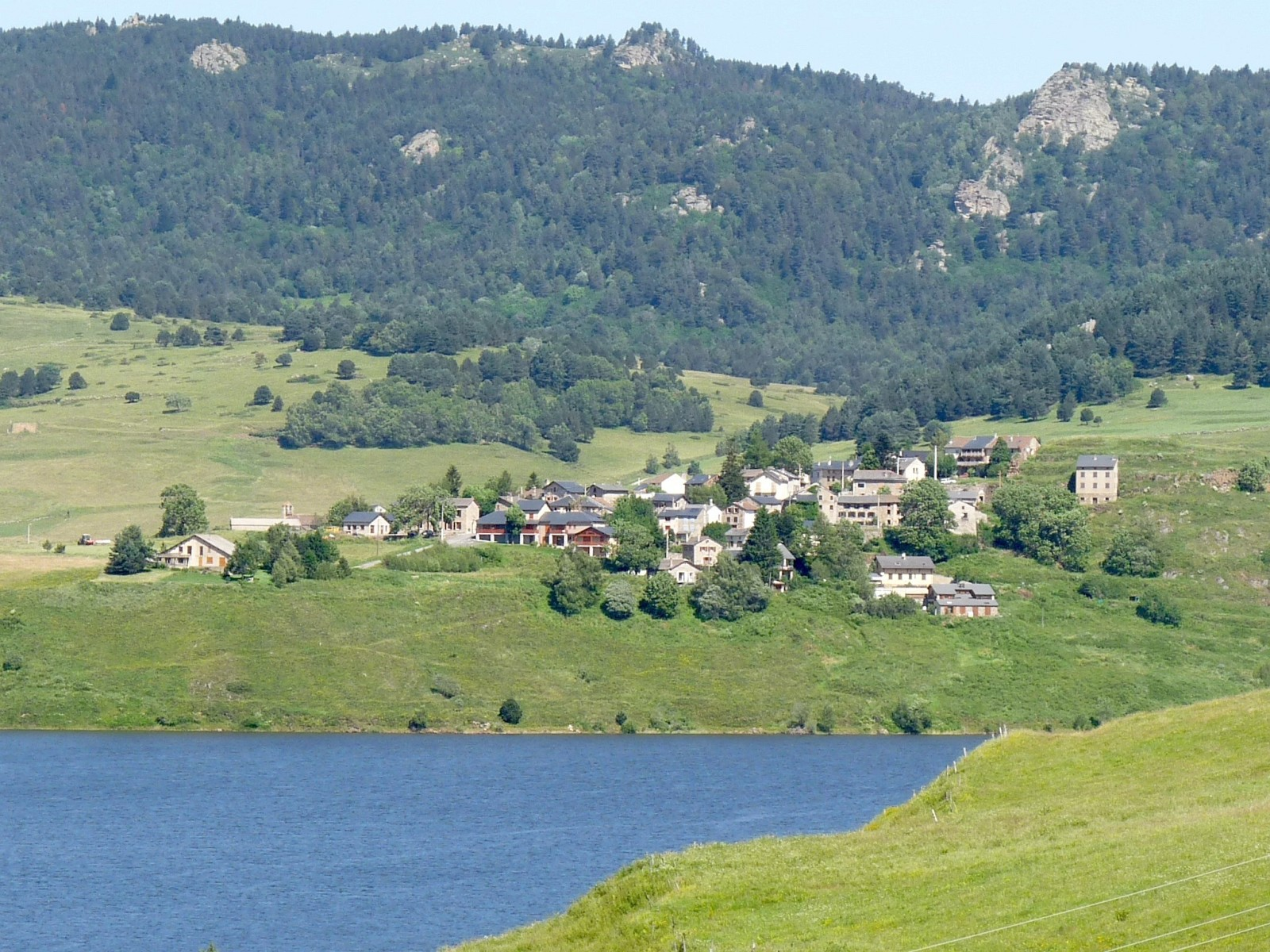
- Puyvalador and the lake
- Location of Puyvalador
- Location within France Location within Occitanie
- Coordinates: 42°38′50″N 2°07′14″E
- Country: France
- Region: Occitania
- Department: Pyrénées-Orientales
- Arrondissement: Prades
- Canton: Les Pyrénées catalanes

Government
  - Mayor (2020–2026): Daniel Marin
- Area^{1}: 19.46 km^{2} (7.51 sq mi)
- Elevation: 1,463 m (4,800 ft)
- Highest elevation: 2,363 m (7,753 ft)
- Lowest elevation: 1,351 m (4,432 ft)
- Population (2023): 68
  - Density: 3.5/km^{2} (9.1/sq mi)
- Time zone: UTC+01:00 (CET)
  - Summer (DST): UTC+02:00 (CEST)
- INSEE/Postal code: 66154 /66210
- ^{1} French Land Register data, which excludes lakes, ponds, glaciers > 1 km^{2} (0.386 sq mi or 247 acres) and river estuaries.

Puyvalador (French pronunciation: [pɥivaladɔʁ]; Catalan: Puigbalador) is a commune in the Pyrénées-Orientales department in southern France.

== Geography ==
Puyvalador is in the canton of Les Pyrénées catalanes and in the arrondissement of Prades.

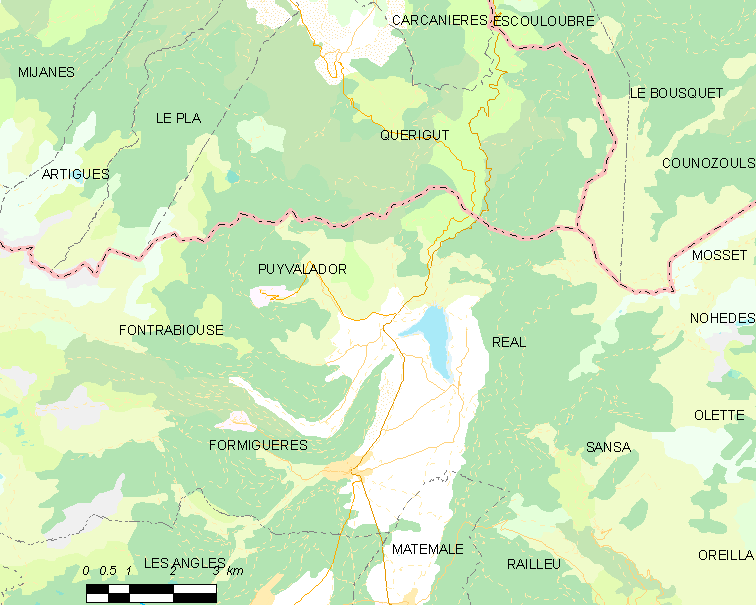
Map of Puyvalador and its surrounding communes

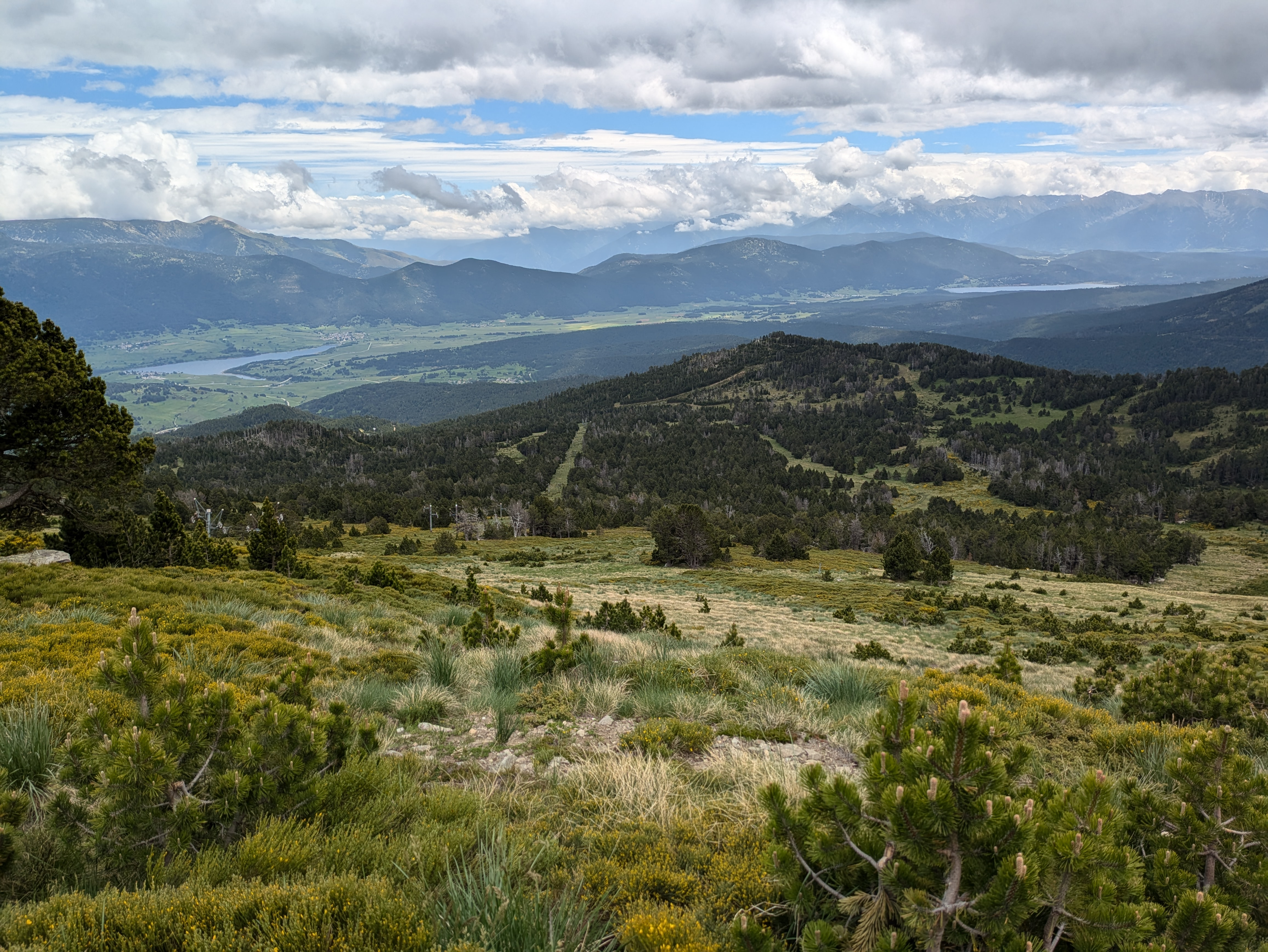
The western slopes of Puyvalador, seen from near the summit of Pic Ginebre (2382 metres), the highest point in the commune.

== Population ==
Historical population
Year	Pop.	±% p.a.
1968	62	—
1975	63	+0.23%
1982	108	+8.00%
1990	82	−3.38%
1999	101	+2.34%
2007	90	−1.43%
2012	72	−4.36%
2017	72	+0.00%
2023	68	−0.95%
Source: INSEE

== See also ==
- Communes of the Pyrénées-Orientales department
