= Matemale =

Matemale Matamala
- Commune
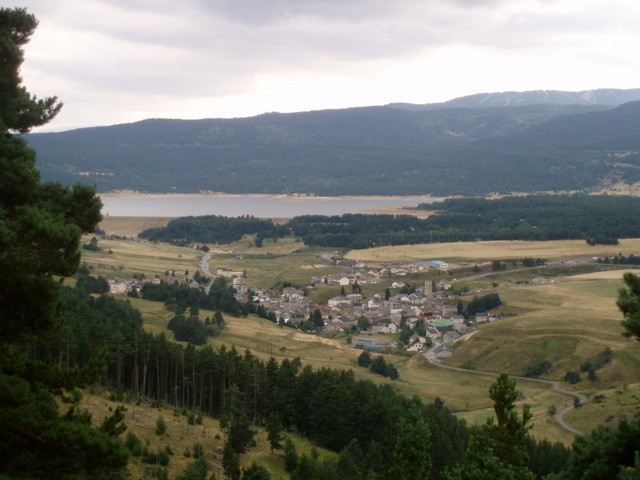
- A general view of Matemale, with the lake in the background
- Location of Matemale
- Location within France Location within Occitanie
- Coordinates: 42°35′16″N 2°07′10″E
- Country: France
- Region: Occitania
- Department: Pyrénées-Orientales
- Arrondissement: Prades
- Canton: Les Pyrénées catalanes

Government
  - Mayor (2020–2026): Michel Garcia
- Area^{1}: 18.88 km^{2} (7.29 sq mi)
- Elevation: 1,500 m (4,900 ft)
- Highest elevation: 2,081 m (6,827 ft)
- Lowest elevation: 1,455 m (4,774 ft)
- Population (2023): 274
  - Density: 14.5/km^{2} (37.6/sq mi)
- Time zone: UTC+01:00 (CET)
  - Summer (DST): UTC+02:00 (CEST)
- INSEE/Postal code: 66105 /66210
- ^{1} French Land Register data, which excludes lakes, ponds, glaciers > 1 km^{2} (0.386 sq mi or 247 acres) and river estuaries.

Matemale (French pronunciation: [matmal]; Catalan: Matamala) is a commune in the Pyrénées-Orientales department in southern France.

== Geography ==
Matemale is located in the canton of Les Pyrénées catalanes and in the arrondissement of Prades.

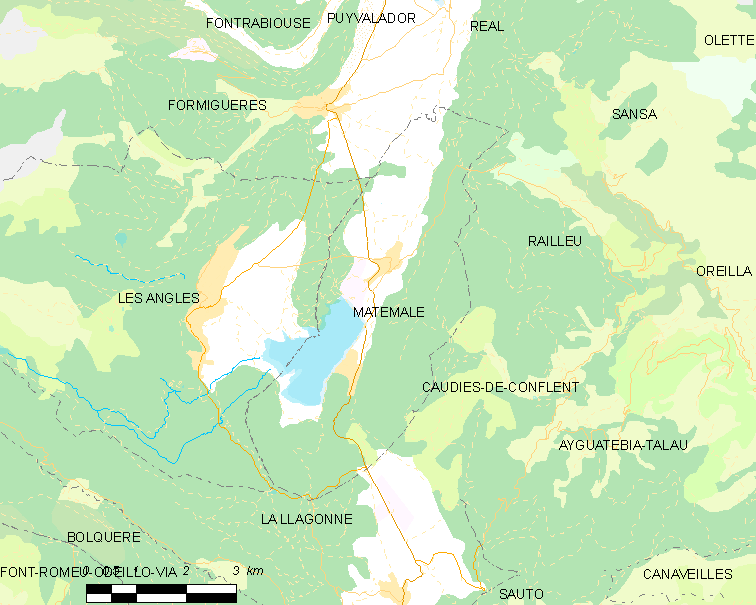
Map of Matemale and its surrounding communes

== Population ==
Historical population
Year	Pop.	±% p.a.
1968	135	—
1975	106	−3.40%
1982	151	+5.18%
1990	222	+4.94%
1999	242	+0.96%
2007	295	+2.51%
2012	279	−1.11%
2017	267	−0.88%
2023	274	+0.43%
Source: INSEE

== See also ==
- Communes of the Pyrénées-Orientales department
