= Belvianes-et-Cavirac =

Commune in Occitanie, France

- Commune
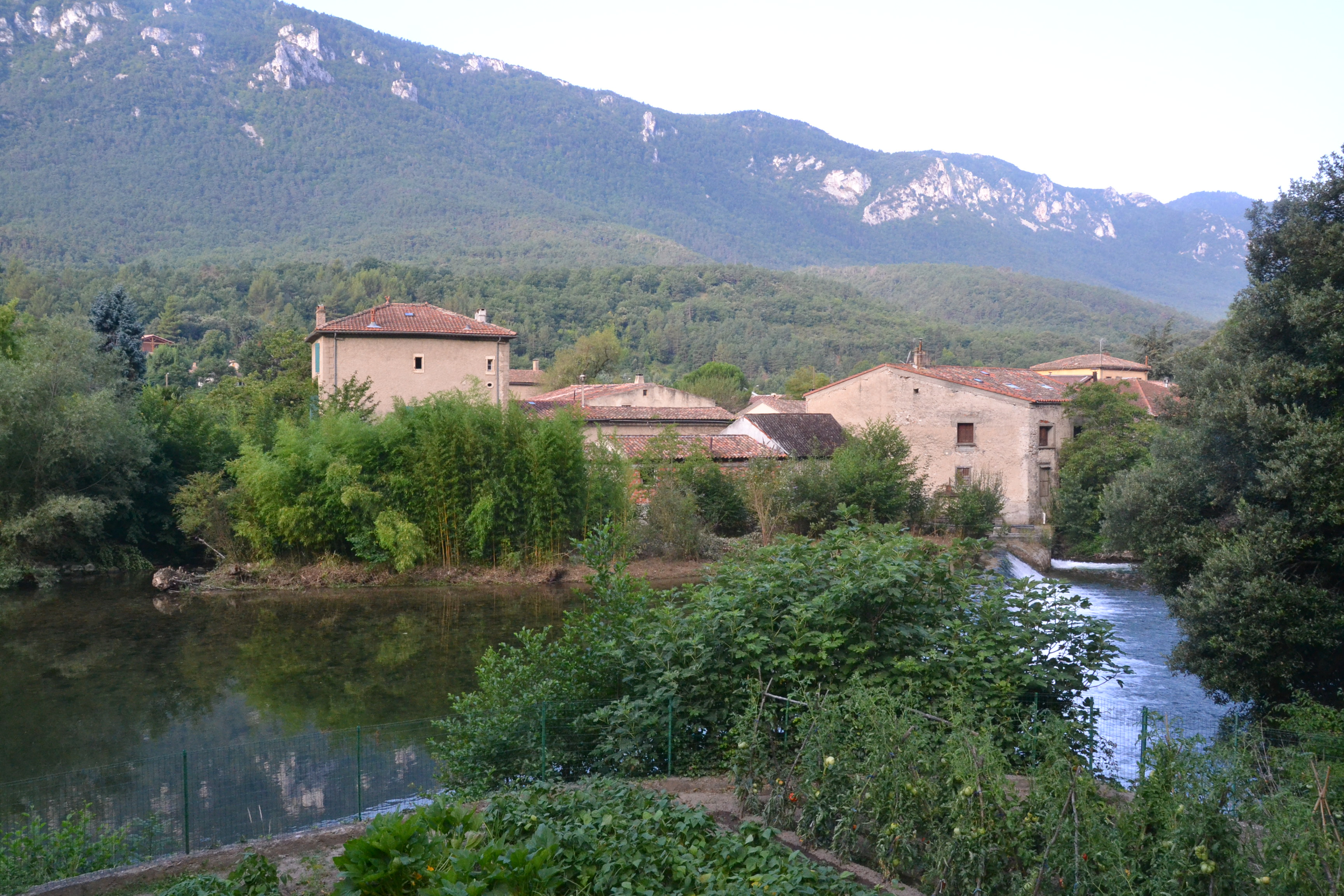
- A general view of Cavirac

- Coat of arms
- Location of Belvianes-et-Cavirac
- Location within France Location within Occitanie
- Coordinates: 42°51′14″N 2°12′05″E
- Country: France
- Region: Occitania
- Department: Aude
- Arrondissement: Limoux
- Canton: La Haute-Vallée de l'Aude

Government
  - Mayor (2020–2026): Alain Chanaud
- Area^{1}: 11.68 km^{2} (4.51 sq mi)
- Elevation: 310 m (1,020 ft)
- Highest elevation: 1,034 m (3,392 ft)
- Lowest elevation: 295 m (968 ft)
- Population (2023): 270
  - Density: 23/km^{2} (60/sq mi)
- Time zone: UTC+01:00 (CET)
  - Summer (DST): UTC+02:00 (CEST)
- INSEE/Postal code: 11035 /11500
- ^{1} French Land Register data, which excludes lakes, ponds, glaciers > 1 km^{2} (0.386 sq mi or 247 acres) and river estuaries.

Belvianes-et-Cavirac (French pronunciation: [bɛlvjan‿e kaviʁak]; Occitan: Bèlvianes e Cavirac) is a commune in the Aude department in southern France. The journalist and writer Gaston Bonheur (1913–1980) was born in Belvianes.

== Population ==
Historical population
Year	Pop.	±% p.a.
1968	342	—
1975	310	−1.39%
1982	333	+1.03%
1990	340	+0.26%
1999	332	−0.26%
2007	285	−1.89%
2012	289	+0.28%
2017	255	−2.47%
2023	270	+0.96%
Source: INSEE

== See also ==
- Communes of the Aude department
