= Canton of Saint-Gervais-sur-Mare =

Coordinates: 43°37′29″N 3°03′24″E

Saint-Gervais-sur-Mare
- Former canton
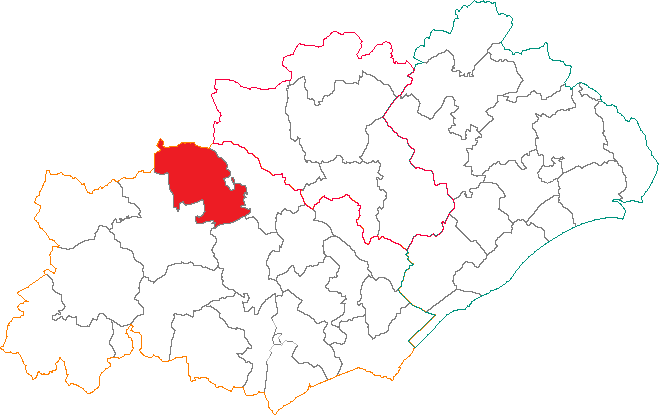
- Country: France
- Region: Occitania
- Department: Hérault
- No. of communes: {{{nbcomm}}}
- Disbanded: 2015
- Population (2012): 8,610

The Canton of Saint-Gervais-sur-Mare is a former subdivision of the French department of Hérault, and its subdivision, the Arrondissement of Béziers. It had 8,610 inhabitants (2012). It was disbanded following the French canton reorganisation which came into effect in March 2015.

== Composition ==
The canton comprised the following communes:

- Les Aires
- Castanet-le-Haut
- Combes
- Hérépian
- Lamalou-les-Bains
- Le Poujol-sur-Orb
- Rosis
- Saint-Gervais-sur-Mare
- Saint-Geniès-de-Varensal
- Taussac-la-Billière
- Villemagne-l'Argentière

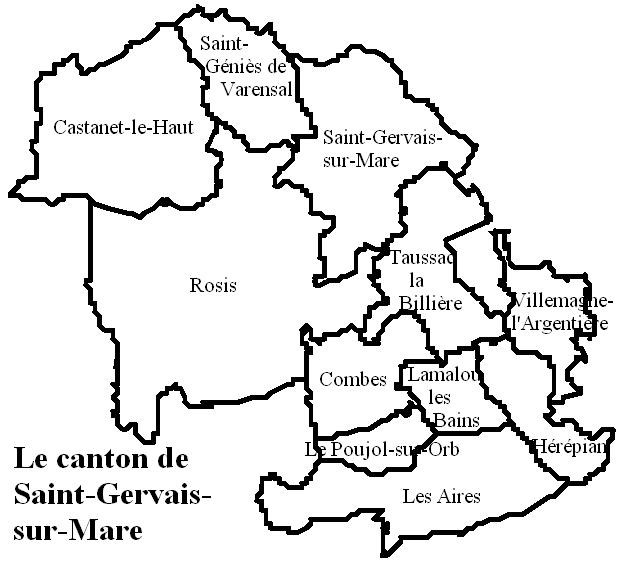
map

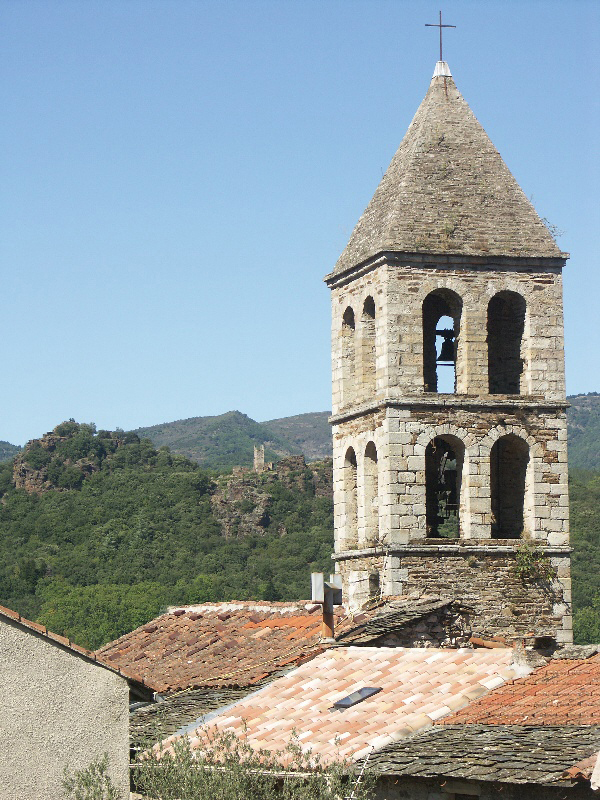
Church of Saint-Gervais-sur-Mare

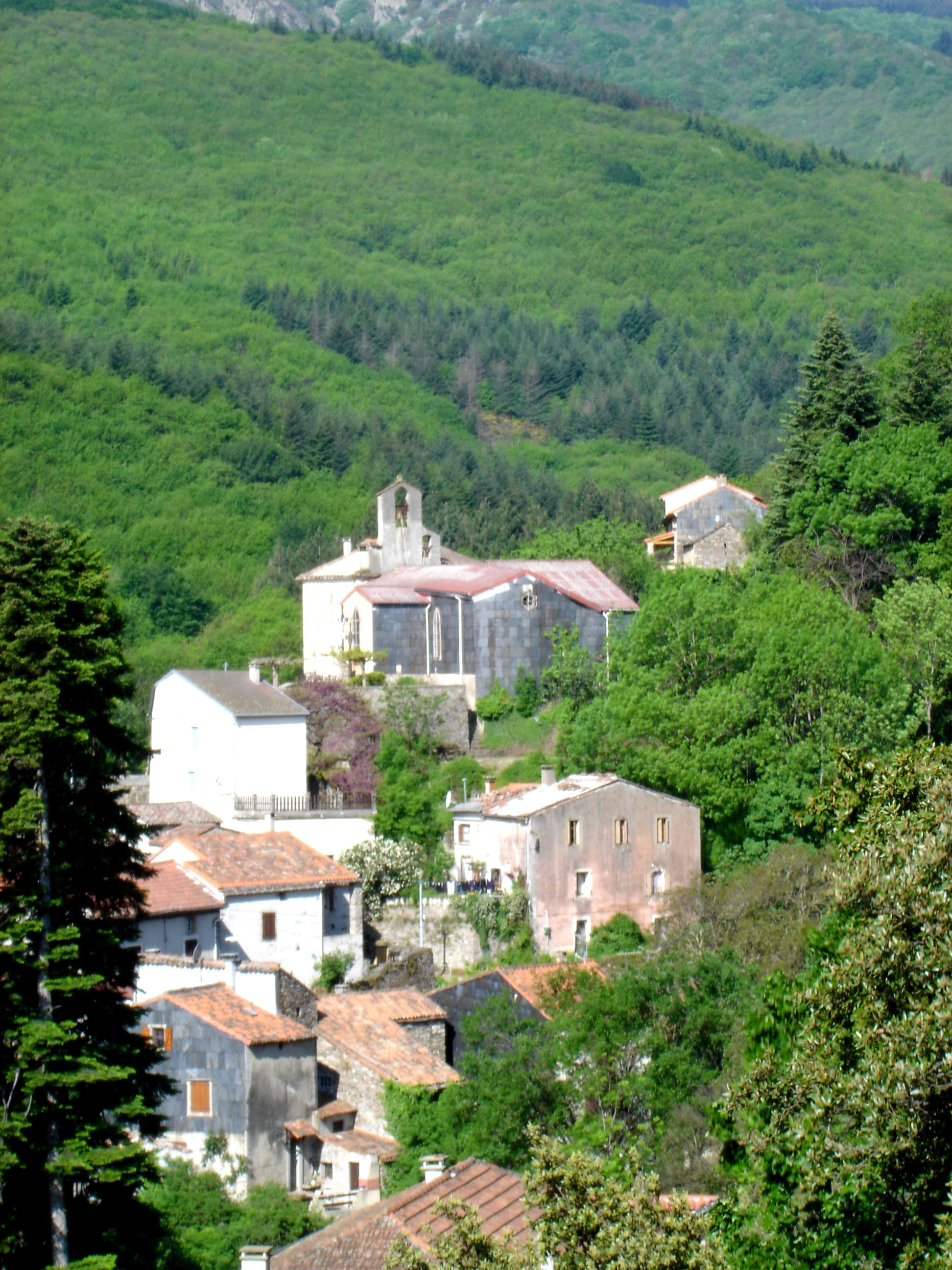
Castanet-le-Haut
