= Orobii =

Ancient people of Cisalpine Gaul

The Orobii or Oromobii (also Orobi or Orumbovii) were an ancient Celtic people who dwelt around present-day Como and Bergamo during the Iron Age. They are usually classed as Celtic and associated with the Golasecca culture, alongside the Laevi, Lepontii, and Insubres, although their ultimate origin was already a matter of uncertainty in antiquity. An ancient tradition credited them with founding the chief towns of the district, among them Como and Bergamo. Their principal town, Bergamo, grew into the easternmost urban centre of the Golasecca culture before declining sharply after the Gallic invasions of the early 4th century BC.

== Name ==
The Orobii are first attested in the lost Origines of Cato the Elder (early 2nd century BC), in a passage transmitted by Pliny the Elder, who, following Cato, credits them with the foundation of Como, Bergamo, Forum Licini, and Parra (modern Parre), while noting that their origin was unknown. In Pliny's manuscript tradition the ethnonym appears in the genitive forms Oromobiorum and Orumboviorum. The form Orobii is not transmitted by the ancient sources and is a humanist emendation.

The ethnonym Orobii appears to be of Celtic origin. It has been compared with the Gaulish noun orbioi (sing. orbios), meaning 'the heirs', with the feminine forms Orobia and Urbia (earlier *Orbia), the ancient names of the Orge river and Orge stream, and with the i-stem Orobis (now the Orb river).

The 1st-century BC Greek scholar Alexander Polyhistor interpreted it as 'those who live in the mountains' (from Greek óros, 'mountain', and bíos, 'life') and on that basis derived the people from Greece, a view transmitted by Pliny.

== Geography ==
The Orobii occupied the mountainous country between Como and Bergamo, between the Insubres to the west and the Cenomani to the east, the land east of the Serio forming a fluid frontier with the latter. The Sottoceneri region, in the present-day Swiss canton of Ticino, lay within their sphere of influence.

Their territory lay to the north of the Gallianates, Bromanenses, and Anesiates, to the east of the Subinates and Ausuciates, to the west of the Gennanates, Trumplini, and Camunni, and to the south of the Aneuniates.

== History ==
Modern scholarship generally regards the Orobii as Celtic, belonging to the older, pre-Gallic population of the western Po plain associated with the Golasecca culture rather than to the La Tène Gauls who entered Italy from the 4th century BC. Together with the Laevi, the Lepontii, and the Insubres, they are reckoned among the peoples associated with that culture.

Bergomum (modern Bergamo) was reckoned their principal oppidum. Its hilltop was settled from the late 10th or 9th century BC and grew into a centre of the Golasecca culture. The settlement reached its apogee between the late 6th and the 5th century BC, when it covered some 24 hectares and was the easternmost urban centre of the culture, on the frontier with the Etruscans and the Veneti. This growth was bound up with the expansion of Etruscan trade in the Po plain from the late 6th century BC. The settlement declined sharply after the Gallic invasions, conventionally dated to 388 BC, contracting to about 1.3 hectares as the Etruscan and Golasecca trade network broke down.

Their town of Parra (modern Parre) lay on the alpine margin of their territory, in the Val Seriana near one of the main mining districts of northern Italy. It is identified with a hilltop settlement occupied from the late Bronze Age to the 1st century BC. Its material culture shared distinctive features with that of Bergomum, while showing strong Raetic and alpine influence. The Bergomenses were held to derive from the oppidum of Parra, and the archaeological sequence bears out the chronological priority of Parra over Bergomum that this tradition implies.

== Settlement and material culture ==
Archaeologically the Orobian district is known above all from two sites, the hill of Bergomum and the terrace of Parra. Bergomum occupied a naturally defensible hill commanding a wide stretch of the Po plain and the routes into the Brembana and Seriana valleys, both rich in metal ores. Parra lay higher up the Val Seriana, above one of the principal mining districts of northern Italy and on the trails running to the central Alps and the Grisons.

Bergomum began at the end of the Final Bronze Age as a village of some 2.5 hectares and was one of the few settlements of the district to survive without interruption into the Early Iron Age. In the 6th and 5th centuries BC it was rebuilt across the whole hilltop as a planned and regularly organised urban centre, in which metalworking is the only craft that can be securely located. Its material culture, at first close to the eastern Paleo-veneti world, had by then aligned with the Golasecca culture and in particular with its eastern facies centred on Como, a shift also seen in the pottery of Parra. No cemeteries have been found, but a votive deposit of bronze vessels at Curno, including a tripod paralleled in a late 8th- or early 7th-century BC grave at Lavinium, attests long-distance contacts.

At Parra, metalworking was central from the start, and a large hoard of Iron Age metalwork was found there as early as 1883. Unlike Bergomum, the settlement was not broken off by the Gallic invasions, and its later material combined alpine and Gaulish products down to its abandonment in the 1st century BC.

== Early modern reception ==
In the early 16th century the Orobii became a subject of antiquarian interest in Bergamo. The humanist Giovanni Crisostomo Zanchi devoted to them a three-book Latin treatise, De origine Orobiorum sive Cenomanorum (1531) in which he identified the Orobii with the Gaulish Cenomani. Antiquarian reconstructions of this kind drew on the forged Antiquitates published by Annio da Viterbo in 1498, a fabricated corpus of pseudo-ancient texts that supplied the peoples of Italy with an invented ancient genealogy. The identification of the Orobii with the Cenomani has no warrant in the ancient sources, which name the Orobii independently of the Cenomani.
