= Clavennates =

Ancient Gallic tribe

The Clavennates were a local community associated with Clavenna (modern Chiavenna) in the region north of Lake Como. Modern scholarship lists them among the Celtic groups settled along the ancient route later known as the Via Regina, together with the Gallianates of Galliano, the Ausuciates of Ossuccio and the Aneuniates of Olonio.

== Name ==
The Clavennates are named after the settlement of Clavenna (modern Chiavenna), mentioned in the Itinerarium Antonini (3rd century AD) and Tabula Peutingeriana (4th–5th century AD). Johann Ulrich Hubschmied argued that the name Clavenna was of Etruscan origin.

== Geography ==
The Clavennates lived in the area of Clavenna (modern Chiavenna), in the basin of the Mera Valley, north of Lake Como.

== History ==
Archaeological evidence from Piazza Castello (Clavenna) indicates occupation from protohistoric times, with traces from the Late Bronze Age and the Early Iron Age. The Roman phase began in the 1st century BC, when a rectangular building was constructed on the site. Pottery from the period between Romanization and the Early Imperial age included both Celtic-tradition forms and Tyrrhenian imports. Among the Celtic-tradition forms, the clearest pre-Roman survivals were situliform ollae, some still handmade or made on a slow wheel.

The presence of Celtic groups along the Via Regina suggests that the Roman road followed earlier protohistoric routes linking the Insubrian centre of Mediolanum with Lake Como. These groups included the Clavennates, together with the Ausuciates (at Ossuccio), Aneuniates (Olonio) and Gallianates (Galliano).

Clavenna was a vicus (village) administratively attached to the Roman colony of Comum (modern Como). Its importance was linked to traffic along the routes crossing the central Alps between the Mediterranean world and central Europe. From Clavenna, one route crossed the Splügen Pass towards Chur and the Rhine valley, while another passed through the Val Bregaglia towards the Inn and Danube basins.

The name of the community survived as a medieval Latin demonym: a royal diploma mentions the consules Clavennates ('consuls of Chiavenna') in a dispute over the investiture of the county of Chiavenna.
