= Mare (river) =

River in southern France

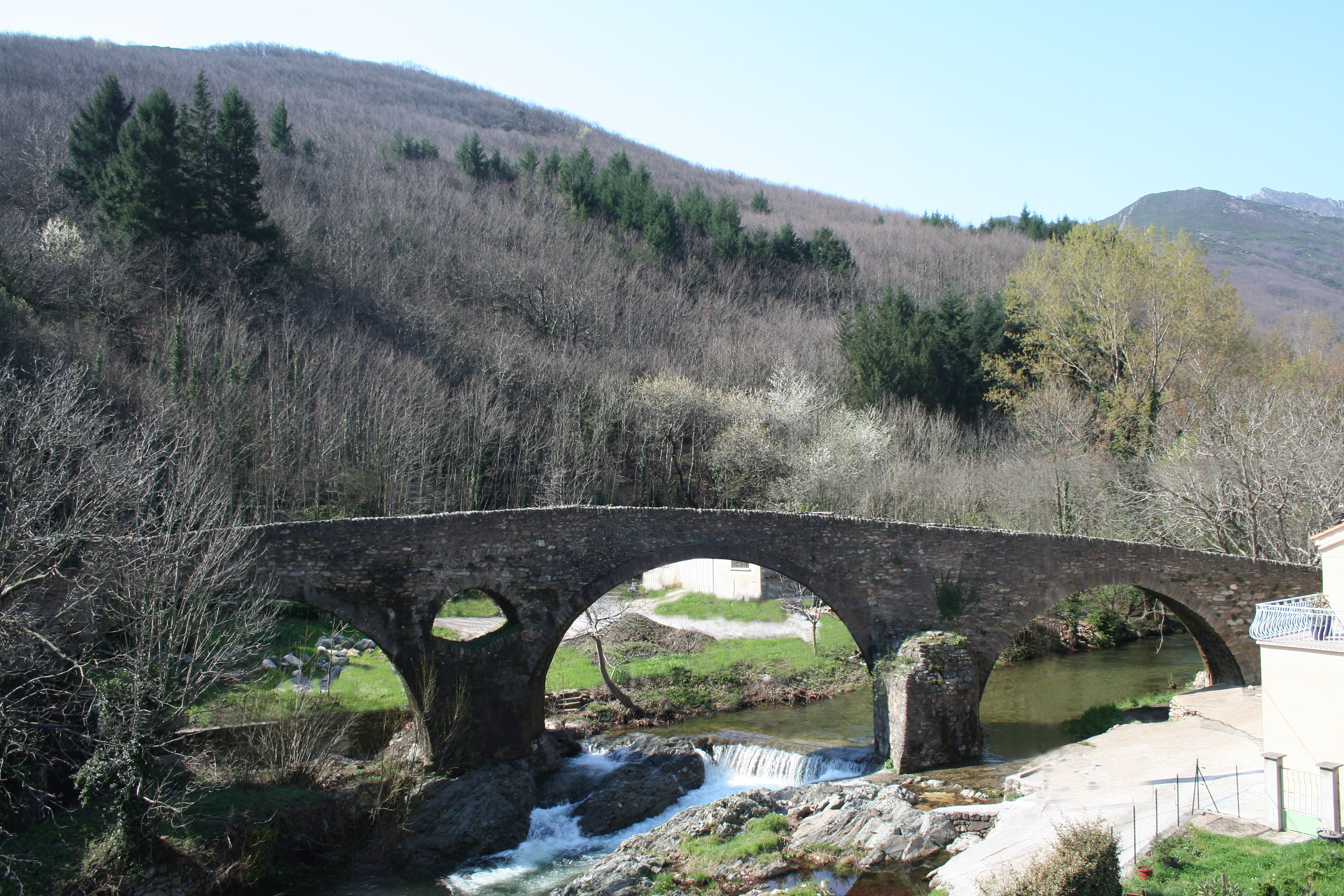
- Bridge over the Mare at Andabre

- Native name: La Mare (French)

Location
- Country: France

Physical characteristics
- Source
  - location: Massif Central
- Mouth
  - location: Orb
  - coordinates: 43°35′29″N 3°7′21″E
- Length: 29.5 km (18.3 mi)
- Discharge
  - average: 4 m^{3}/s (140 cu ft/s)

Basin features
- Progression: Orb→ Mediterranean Sea

The Mare (French pronunciation: [maʁ]) is a 29.5 km (18.3 mi) river in the Hérault department in southern France, which rises in the Caroux-Espinouse hills.

The river's source is above Castanet-le-Haut in the Parc naturel régional du Haut-Languedoc. The river passes through Saint-Gervais-sur-Mare and Villemagne-l'Argentière, before joining the Orb at Hérépian.

== Communes traversed ==
The river passes through the following communes, from source to mouth:

- Castanet-le-Haut
- Rosis
- Saint-Gervais-sur-Mare
- Saint-Étienne-Estréchoux
- La Tour-sur-Orb
- Bédarieux
- Taussac-la-Billière
- Villemagne-l'Argentière
- Hérépian
