= Col de la Croix de Mounis =

Mountain pass in France

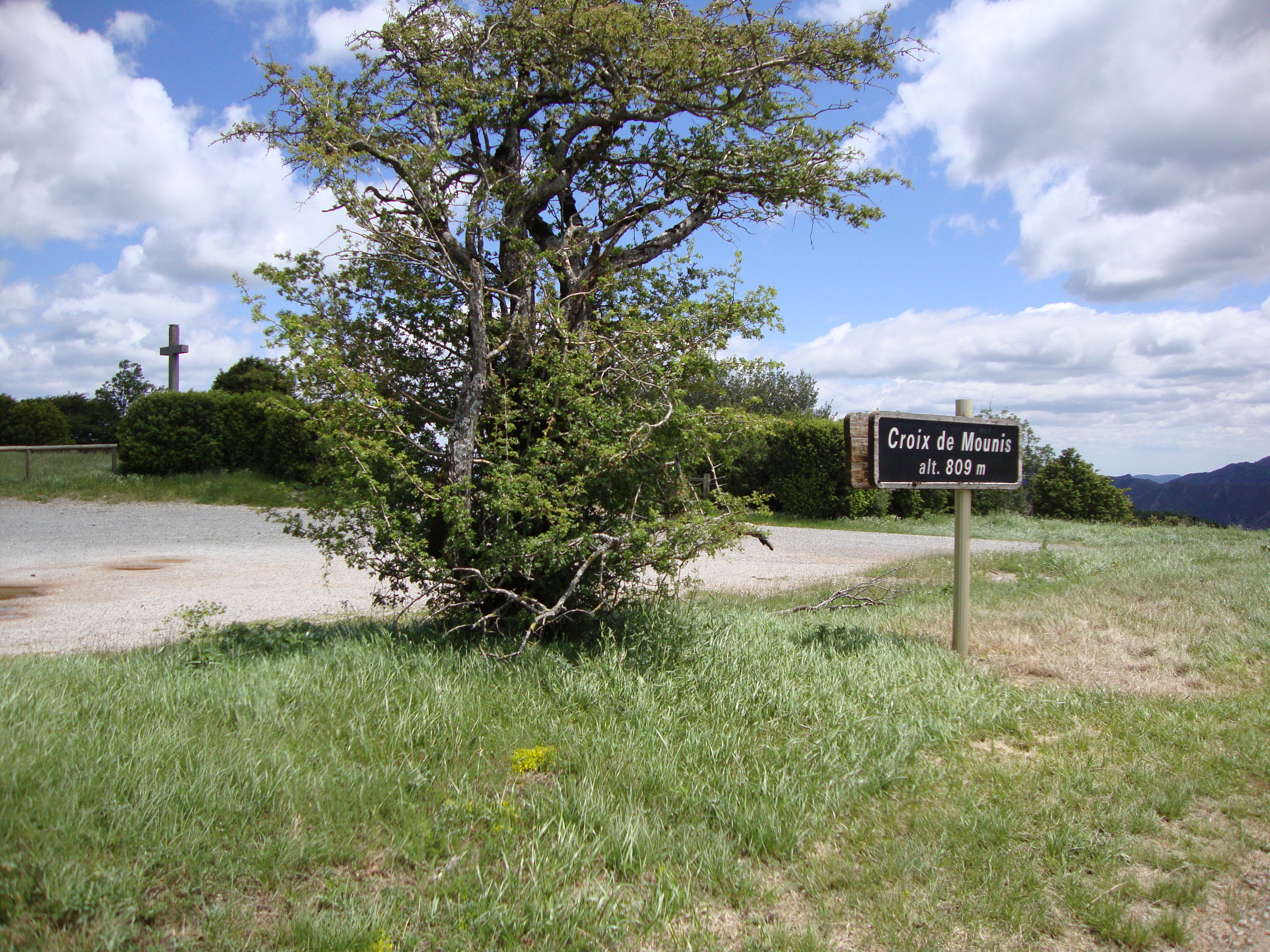
- Col de la Croix de Mounis

- Location within Pyrenees
- Elevation: 808 metres (2,651 ft)
- Traversed by: D922

Third Approach
- Location: Herault, France
- Coordinates: 43°41′7″N 2°57′43″E

Col de la Croix de Mounis (elevation 808 m (2,651 ft)) is a mountain pass in the Parc naturel régional du Haut-Languedoc in southern France. In July 2013, the col was crossed on stage 7 of the Tour de France.

== Location ==
The col is located on the D922 road between Saint-Gervais-sur-Mare and Lacaune on the slopes of the Espinouse mountains.

== Details of the climb ==
The climb starts at the village of Andabre, where the road leaves the valley of the River Mare. From here, the climb is 6.7 km (4.2 mi), climbing 435 m (1,427 ft) at an average gradient of 6.5%.

== Tour de France ==
The Col de la Croix de Mounis has been crossed three times in the Tour de France bicycle race. On the first occasion, in 1953, the pass was descended en route from Albi to Béziers when it was not categorised. In 1972, the col was ranked Category 3, as it was descended en route from Castres to la Grande-Motte.

In 2013, the col was climbed from the south-east for the first time, on Stage 7 between Montpellier and Albi, when it was ranked as a Category 2 climb. The first rider over the summit was Blel Kadri.
