= Gallianates =

Ancient Gallic tribe

The Gallianates or Brecores Gallianates were a Gallic tribe living in the region of modern Cantù (Lombardy), south of Lake Como, during the Roman era.

== Name ==
They are mentioned in a Roman altar dedicated to the Matronis Braecorium Gallianatium.

The ethnic name Gallianates is based on the Celtic stem galli-, which also underlies also ethnonyms such as Gallitae.

The district of Galliano in Cantù is named after the tribe.

== Geography ==
The Gallianates lived in the area of Galliano, a district of Cantù, between Como and Milan.

They were a pagus of the larger Insubres.

== History ==
Gallianum (modern Galliano in Cantù), the centre of the Gallianates, was a rural village (vicus) of protohistoric origin. Following the Roman conquest of the Po Valley, the community became integrated into the Roman administrative and economic system.

The presence of Celtic groups along the Via Regina suggests that the Roman road followed earlier protohistoric routes linking the Insubrian centre of Mediolanum with Lake Como. These groups included Gallianates, together with the Ausuciates (at Ossuccio), Aneuniates (Olonio) and Clavennates (Chiavenna). Prominent families from Comum, including the Plinii and the Caecilii, held estates in the territory of the Gallianates and may have established rural and manufacturing complexes there.
