= Bergalei =

Gallic tribe

The Bergalei were a Gallic tribe dwelling in the Val Bregaglia during the Iron Age and the Roman period.

== Name ==
The ethnic name Bergalei appears to derive from the Gaulish stem for 'mountain, mount', *berga-. It has been translated as the 'highland people'.

== Geography ==
The Bergalei lived in the Val Bregaglia, near the settlements of Clavenna (Chiavenna) and Murus (Bondo). The Barrington Atlas locates their territory north of the Aneuniates, south of the Suanetes, west of the Rugusci.

After their subjugation by Rome in 15 BC, they were integrated into the province of Raetia.

== History ==
They are mentioned during the reign of Claudius (41–54) in the context of an old dispute with the people of Comum.

== Culture ==
The Bergalei were not part of the Raeti. Two votive inscriptions dedicated to the god Mercurius Cissonius attest of a Celtic influence.
