= Castanet-le-Haut =

- Commune
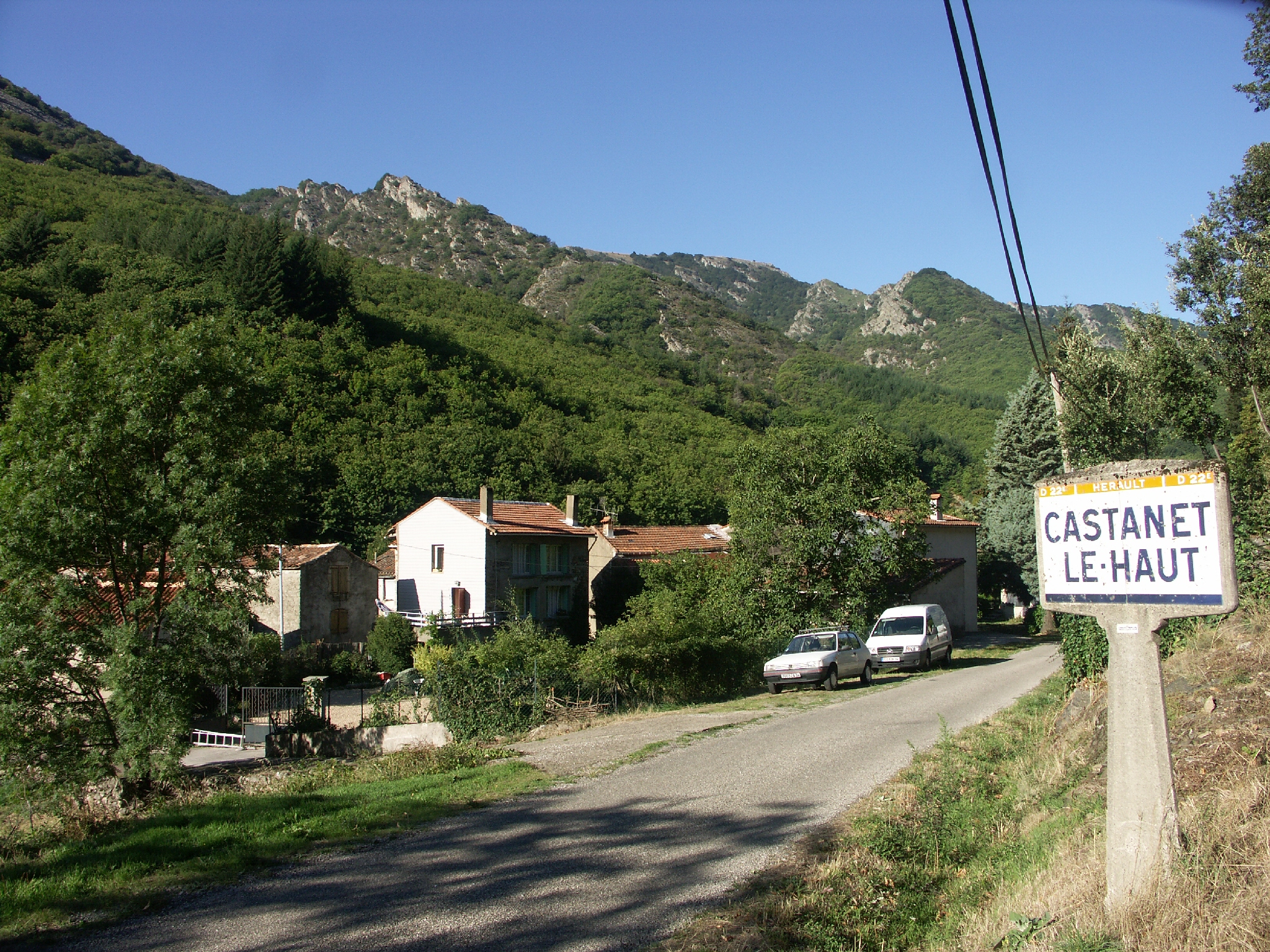
- The road into Castanet-le-Haut

- Coat of arms
- Location of Castanet-le-Haut
- Location within France Location within Occitanie
- Coordinates: 43°40′07″N 2°58′21″E
- Country: France
- Region: Occitania
- Department: Hérault
- Arrondissement: Béziers
- Canton: Saint-Pons-de-Thomières
- Intercommunality: CC du Haut-Languedoc

Government
  - Mayor (2020–2026): Max Allies
- Area^{1}: 27.55 km^{2} (10.64 sq mi)
- Elevation: 450 m (1,480 ft)
- Highest elevation: 1,124 m (3,688 ft)
- Lowest elevation: 389 m (1,276 ft)
- Population (2023): 224
  - Density: 8.13/km^{2} (21.1/sq mi)
- Time zone: UTC+01:00 (CET)
  - Summer (DST): UTC+02:00 (CEST)
- INSEE/Postal code: 34055 /34610
- ^{1} French Land Register data, which excludes lakes, ponds, glaciers > 1 km^{2} (0.386 sq mi or 247 acres) and river estuaries.

Castanet-le-Haut (French pronunciation: [kastanɛ lə o]; Occitan: Castanet lo Naut) is a commune in the Hérault department in southern France.

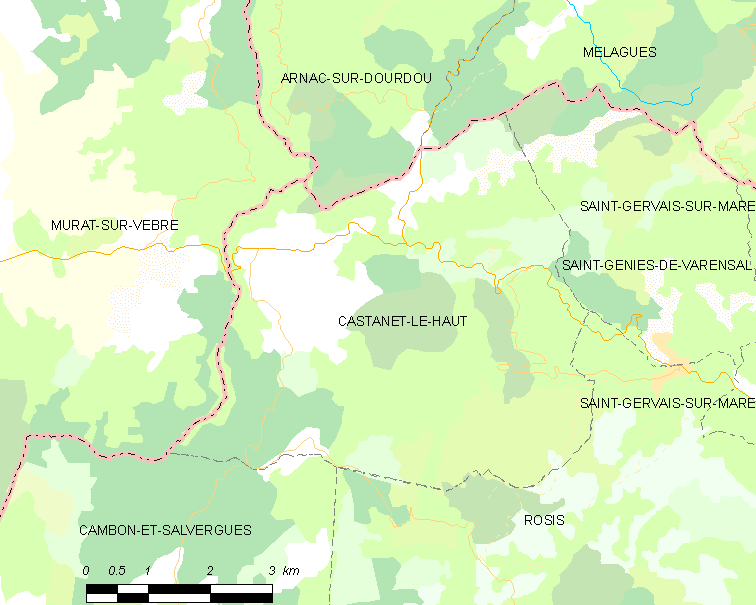
Map

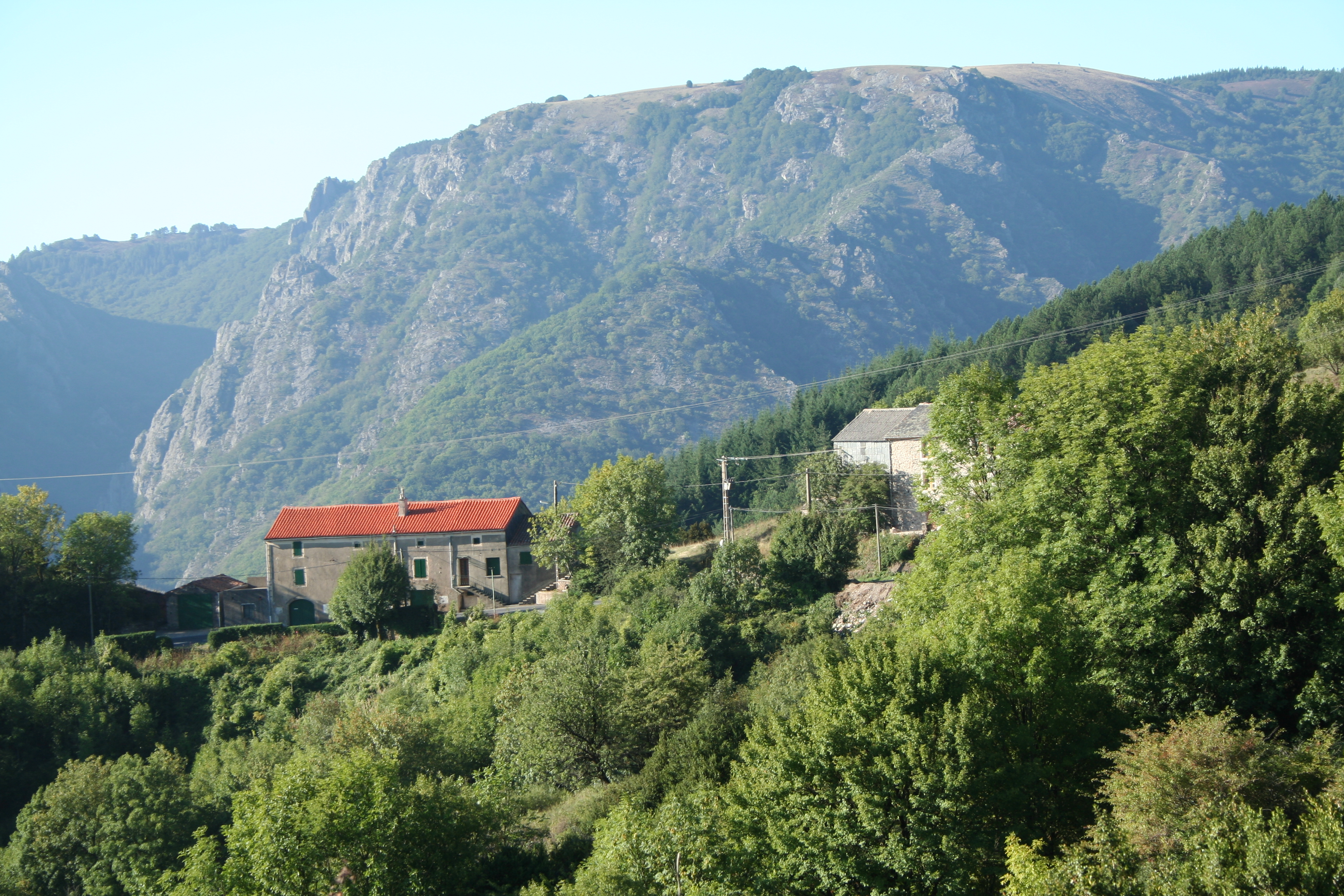
Croix de Mounis, l'Espinouse

== Geography ==
The commune is traversed by the rivers Dourdou de Camarès and Mare.

== Population ==
Historical population
Year	Pop.	±% p.a.
1968	222	—
1975	188	−2.35%
1982	164	−1.93%
1990	148	−1.27%
1999	167	+1.35%
2007	189	+1.56%
2012	196	+0.73%
2017	206	+1.00%
2023	224	+1.41%
Source: INSEE

The residents are called Castanetais in French.

== See also ==
- Communes of the Hérault department
