= Orb (river) =

River in southern France

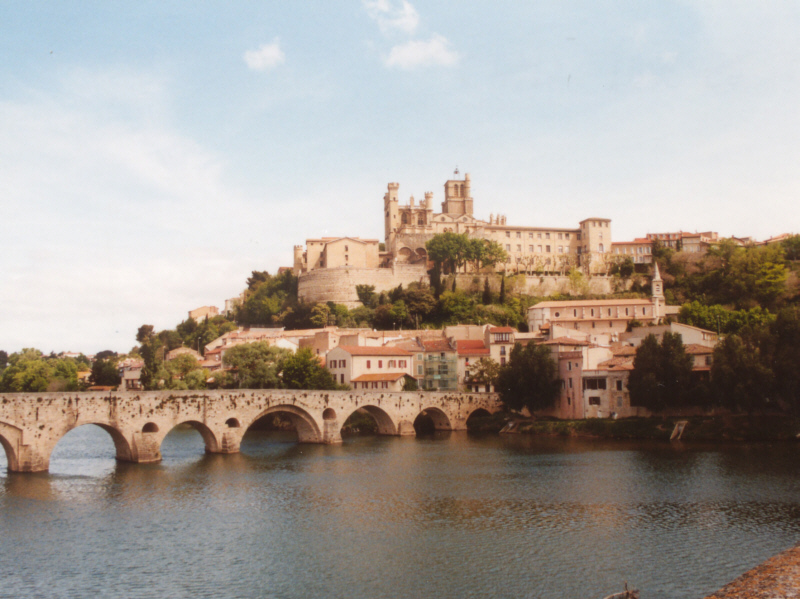
- The Orb in Béziers

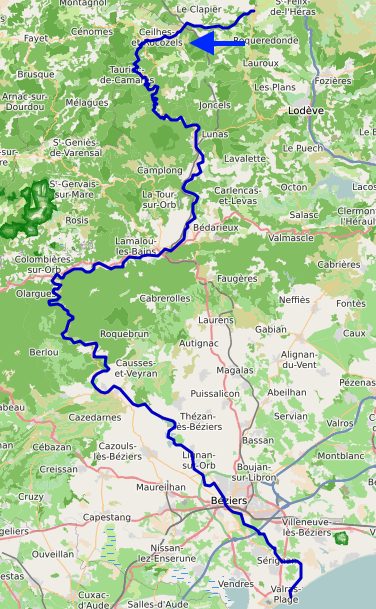

- Native name: L'Orb (French)

Location
- Country: France

Physical characteristics
- Source
  - location: Massif Central
  - elevation: 820 m (2,690 ft)
- Mouth
  - location: Mediterranean Sea
  - coordinates: 43°14′47″N 3°17′54″E
- Length: 135.6 km (84.3 mi)
- Basin size: 1,400 km^{2} (540 mi^{2})
- Discharge
  - average: 25 m^{3}/s (880 cu ft/s)

The Orb (French pronunciation: [ɔʁb]; Occitan: Òrb) is a 135.6-kilometre (84.3 mi) long river in the department of Hérault in the south of France. It flows into the Mediterranean Sea at Valras-Plage. The river flows through the towns of Bédarieux and Béziers, where it is crossed by the canal du Midi on the Orb Aqueduct.

== Geography ==
The Orb flows through the following communes:

- Ceilhes-et-Rocozels
- Avène
- Le Bousquet-d'Orb
- La Tour-sur-Orb
- Bédarieux
- Hérépian
- Lamalou-les-Bains
- Le Poujol-sur-Orb
- Roquebrun
- Cessenon-sur-Orb
- Lignan-sur-Orb
- Béziers
- Sauvian
- Sérignan
- Valras-Plage
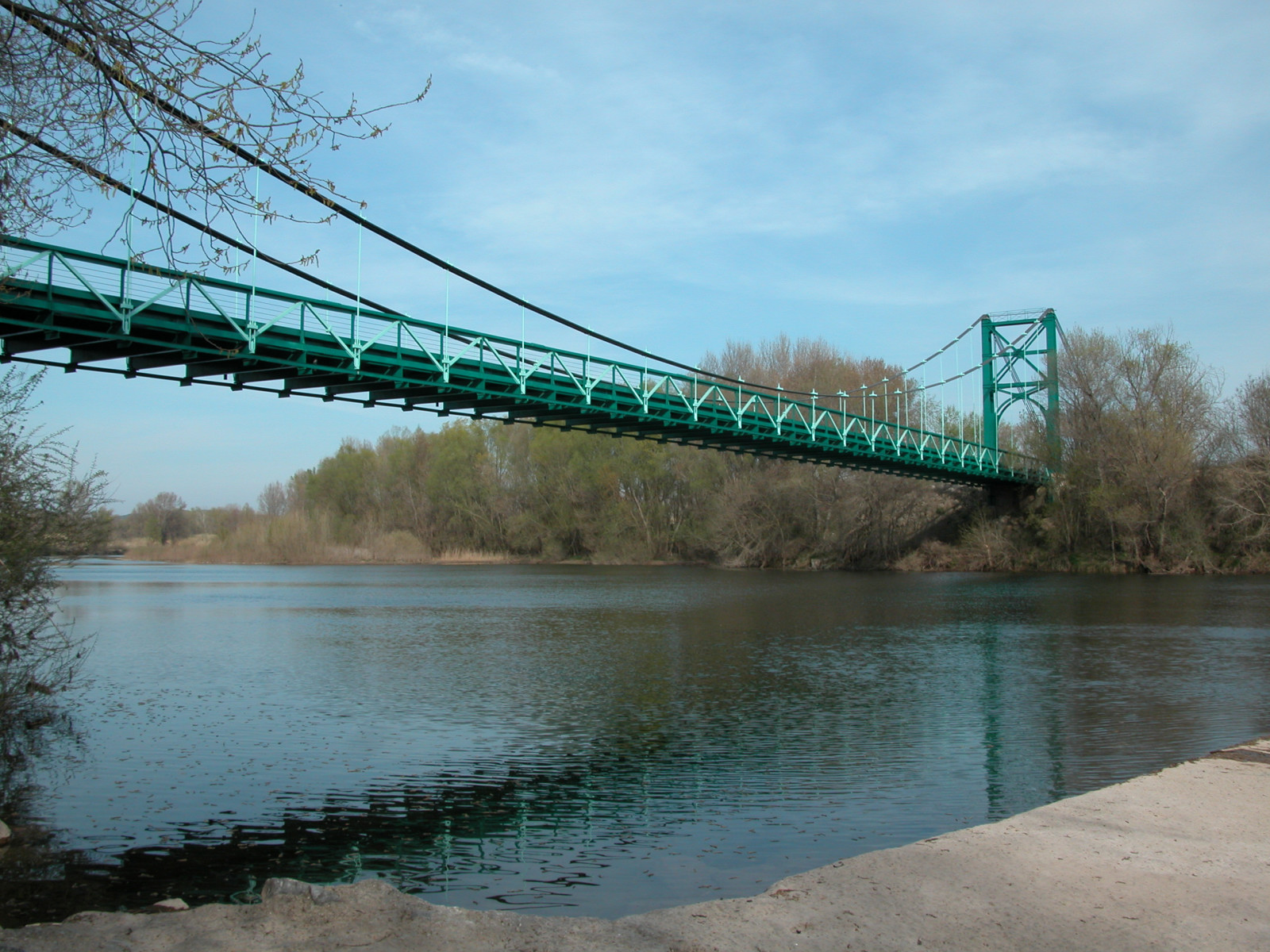
Orb river bridge at Cazouls

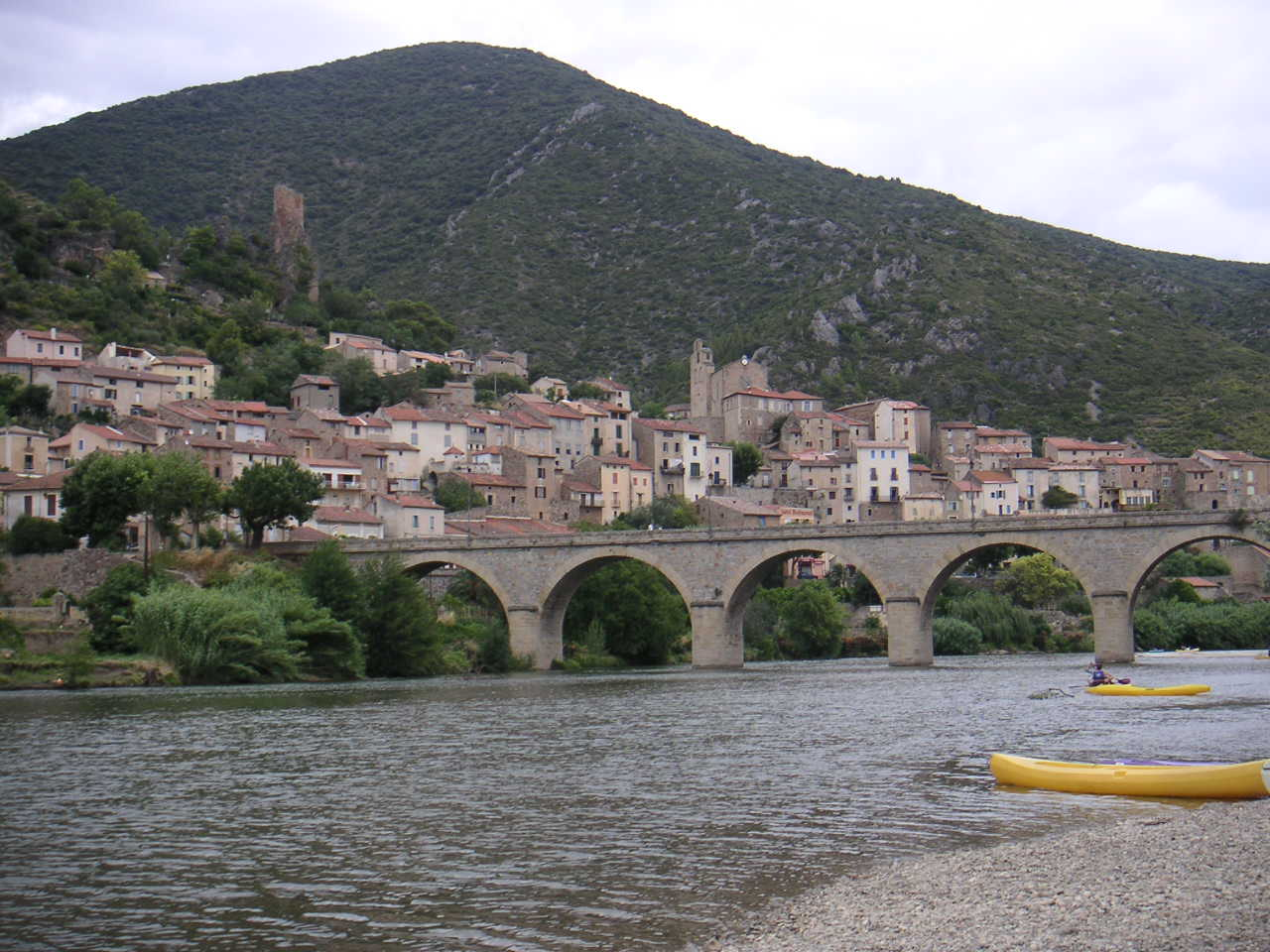
The Orb at Roquebrun

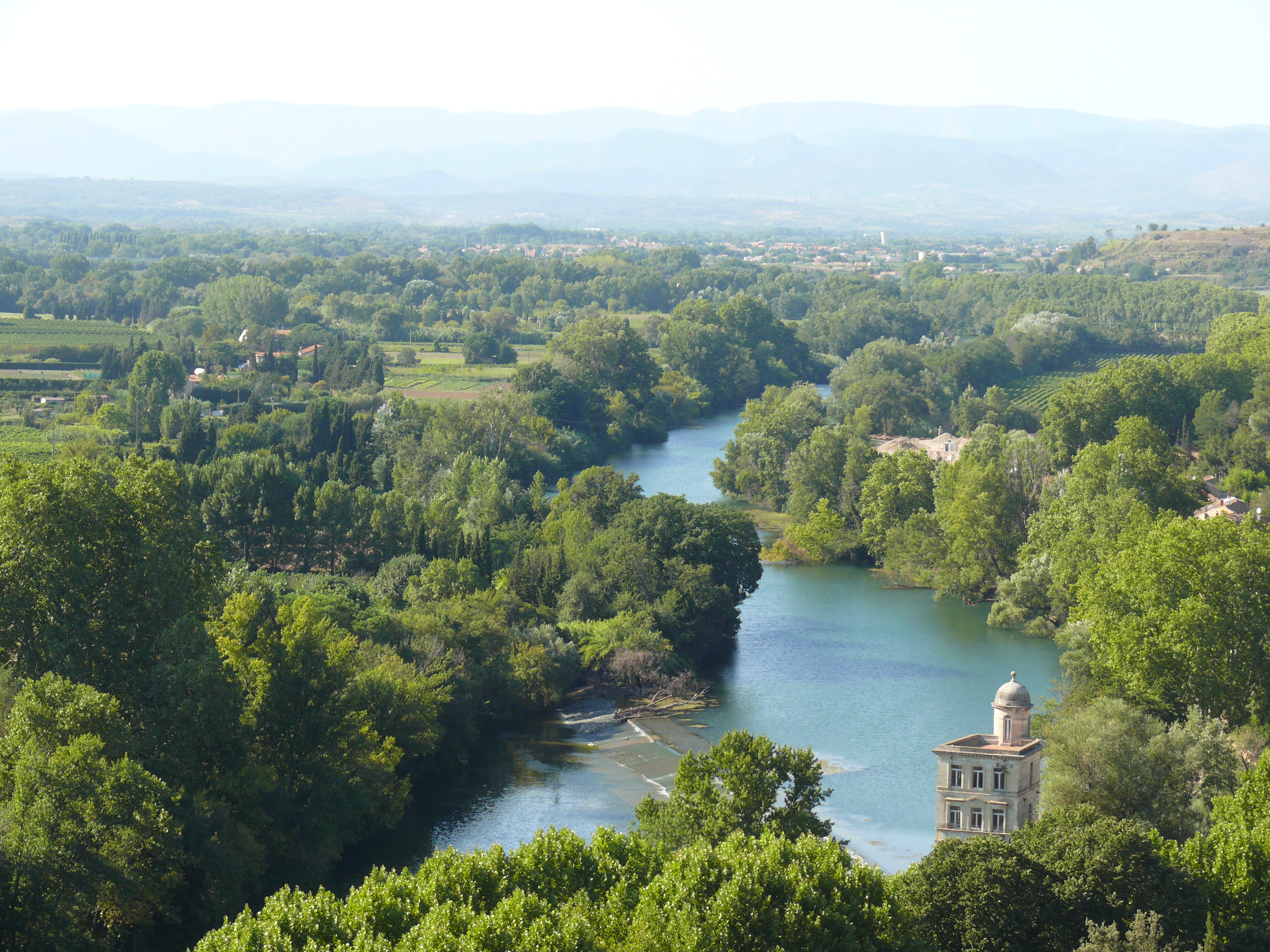
The Orb viewed from Béziers

== Tributaries ==
The following rivers flow into the Orb:

- Jaur 30 kilometres (19 mi)
- Lirou 30 kilometres (19 mi)
- Mare 29 kilometres (18 mi)
- Taurou 25 kilometres (16 mi)
- Vernazobre 24 kilometres (15 mi)
- Rieutort 18 kilometres (11 mi)
- Héric 14 kilometres (9 mi)
