= Roquebrun =

- Commune
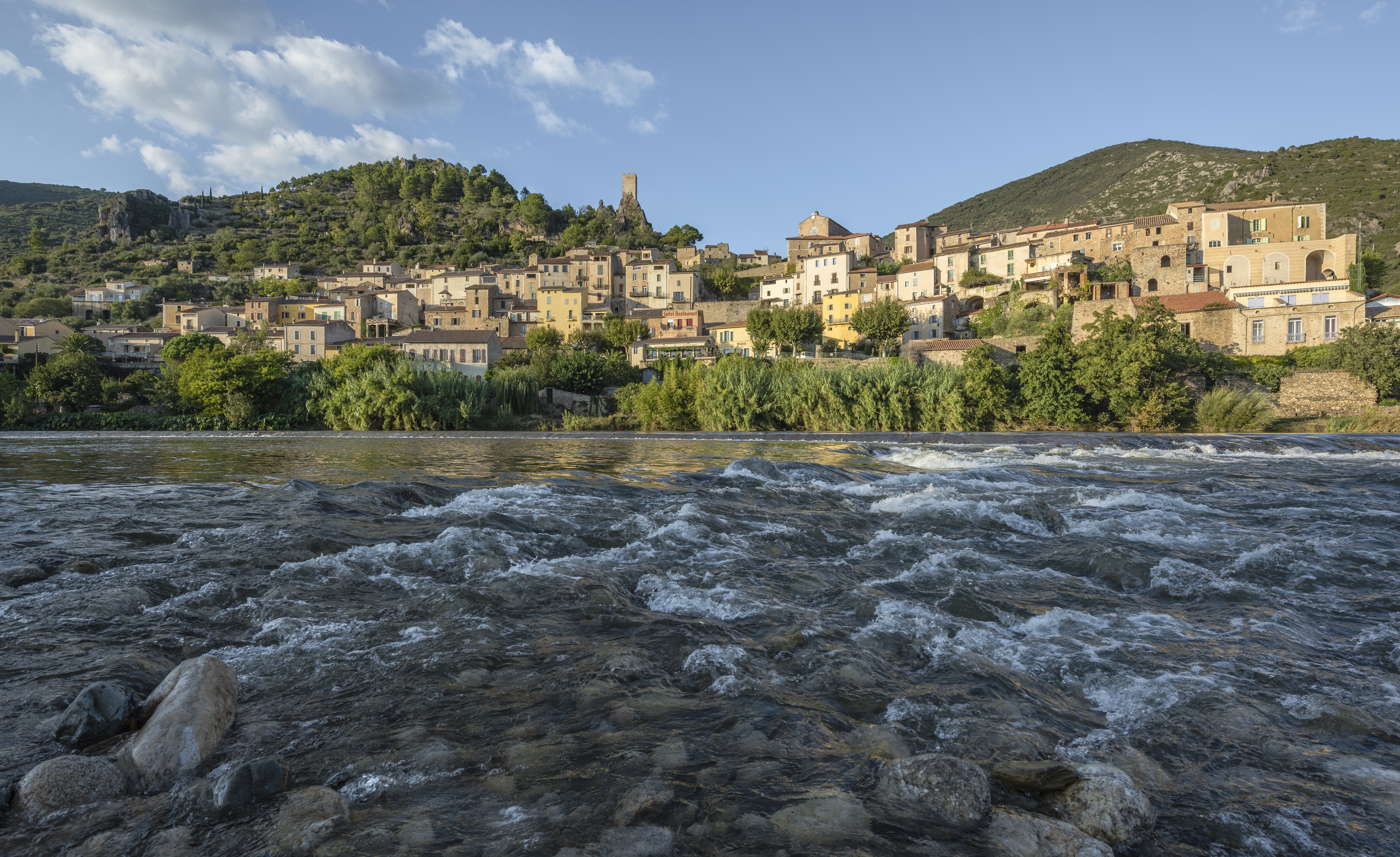
- Roquebrun and the Orb

- Coat of arms
- Location of Roquebrun
- Location within France Location within Occitanie
- Coordinates: 43°30′05″N 3°01′52″E
- Country: France
- Region: Occitania
- Department: Hérault
- Arrondissement: Béziers
- Canton: Saint-Pons-de-Thomières

Government
  - Mayor (2020–2026): Catherine Lister
- Area^{1}: 39.64 km^{2} (15.31 sq mi)
- Elevation: 89 m (292 ft)
- Highest elevation: 731 m (2,398 ft)
- Lowest elevation: 56 m (184 ft)
- Population (2023): 601
  - Density: 15.2/km^{2} (39.3/sq mi)
- Time zone: UTC+01:00 (CET)
  - Summer (DST): UTC+02:00 (CEST)
- INSEE/Postal code: 34232 /34460
- ^{1} French Land Register data, which excludes lakes, ponds, glaciers > 1 km^{2} (0.386 sq mi or 247 acres) and river estuaries.

Roquebrun (French pronunciation: [ʁɔk.bʁœ̃]; Occitan: Ròcabrun) is a commune in the Hérault department in the Occitanie region in southern France.

== Geography ==
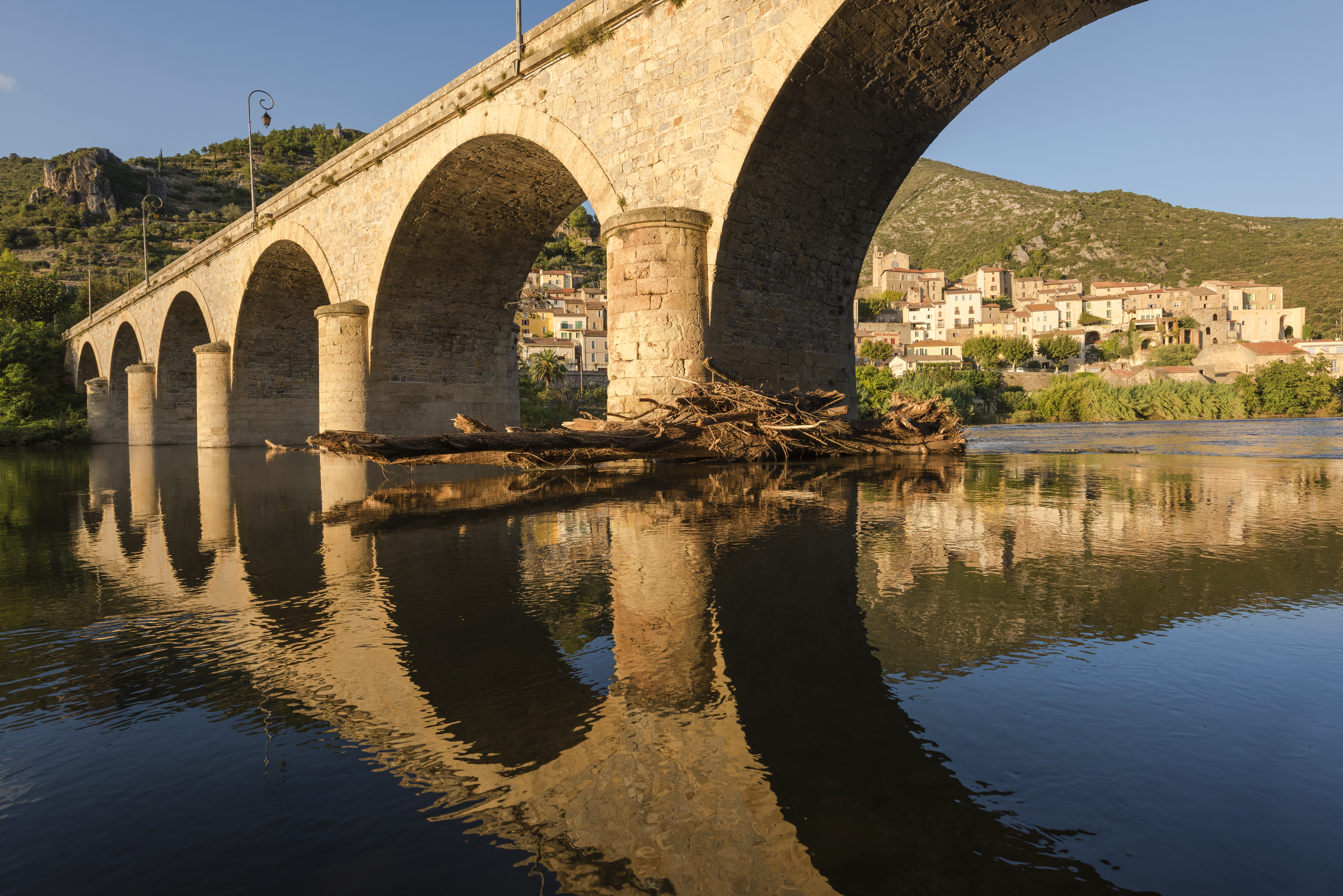
The bridge above the Orb

Roquebrun is a large village situated at the southern entry to the National Park of the High Languedoc. Most of the village is between 200 and 350 metres above sea level and more than 100 metres above the Orb River which flows from the mountains to the west.

=== Climate ===
Overall the pattern of weather is Mediterranean but Roquebrun is also affected by winds from the Massif Central to the north and the Pyrenees to the west. However, the village is sheltered by hills to the north, east and west and this, with the remnants of nearby heat from underlying volcanic intrusion produces a microclimate in which orange, lemon and pomegranate and several types of palm trees are able to flourish and produce fruit. Roquebrun is also known as the 'Le Petit Nice' because its location above the river, giving a view similar to that seen from the corniche on the mediterranean coast of Provence, and because of its vegetation, which is dominated by grape vines and the native garrigue, similar to the Chaparral in California. The lower slopes of the hills are covered by the garrigue: cistus (rockrose), thyme, rosemary, arbousier (arbutus or strawberry tree) and other flowers and shrubs. The Mediterranean Garden, open to the public, is located at the top of the village below the Tour de Guep, and displays plants which are grown in Mediterranean climates all over the world.

Climate data for Roquebrun (1981–2010 averages, extremes 1955−2019)
Month	Jan	Feb	Mar	Apr	May	Jun	Jul	Aug	Sep	Oct	Nov	Dec	Year
Record high °C (°F)	23.8 (74.8)	27.2 (81.0)	29.7 (85.5)	34.7 (94.5)	36.1 (97.0)	45.7 (114.3)	41.0 (105.8)	43.3 (109.9)	38.5 (101.3)	34.7 (94.5)	27.5 (81.5)	23.0 (73.4)	45.7 (114.3)
Mean daily maximum °C (°F)	12.0 (53.6)	13.0 (55.4)	16.1 (61.0)	18.5 (65.3)	22.8 (73.0)	27.2 (81.0)	30.4 (86.7)	30.1 (86.2)	26.2 (79.2)	20.9 (69.6)	15.6 (60.1)	12.6 (54.7)	20.5 (68.9)
Daily mean °C (°F)	7.8 (46.0)	8.3 (46.9)	11.1 (52.0)	13.4 (56.1)	17.4 (63.3)	21.3 (70.3)	24.2 (75.6)	23.9 (75.0)	20.4 (68.7)	16.2 (61.2)	11.4 (52.5)	8.4 (47.1)	15.4 (59.7)
Mean daily minimum °C (°F)	3.5 (38.3)	3.7 (38.7)	6.1 (43.0)	8.3 (46.9)	12.0 (53.6)	15.4 (59.7)	18.0 (64.4)	17.7 (63.9)	14.6 (58.3)	11.6 (52.9)	7.2 (45.0)	4.3 (39.7)	10.2 (50.4)
Record low °C (°F)	−11.5 (11.3)	−15.2 (4.6)	−9.0 (15.8)	−0.5 (31.1)	2.0 (35.6)	5.5 (41.9)	7.5 (45.5)	8.5 (47.3)	4.0 (39.2)	−0.5 (31.1)	−7.0 (19.4)	−11.8 (10.8)	−15.2 (4.6)
Average precipitation mm (inches)	68.5 (2.70)	71.6 (2.82)	44.2 (1.74)	65.4 (2.57)	61.0 (2.40)	40.6 (1.60)	25.8 (1.02)	46.4 (1.83)	72.7 (2.86)	106.6 (4.20)	93.3 (3.67)	86.6 (3.41)	782.7 (30.81)
Average precipitation days (≥ 1.0 mm)	7.0	6.1	5.8	7.1	6.4	3.9	2.8	4.2	4.9	7.0	5.9	6.0	67.1
Source: Meteociel

== History ==
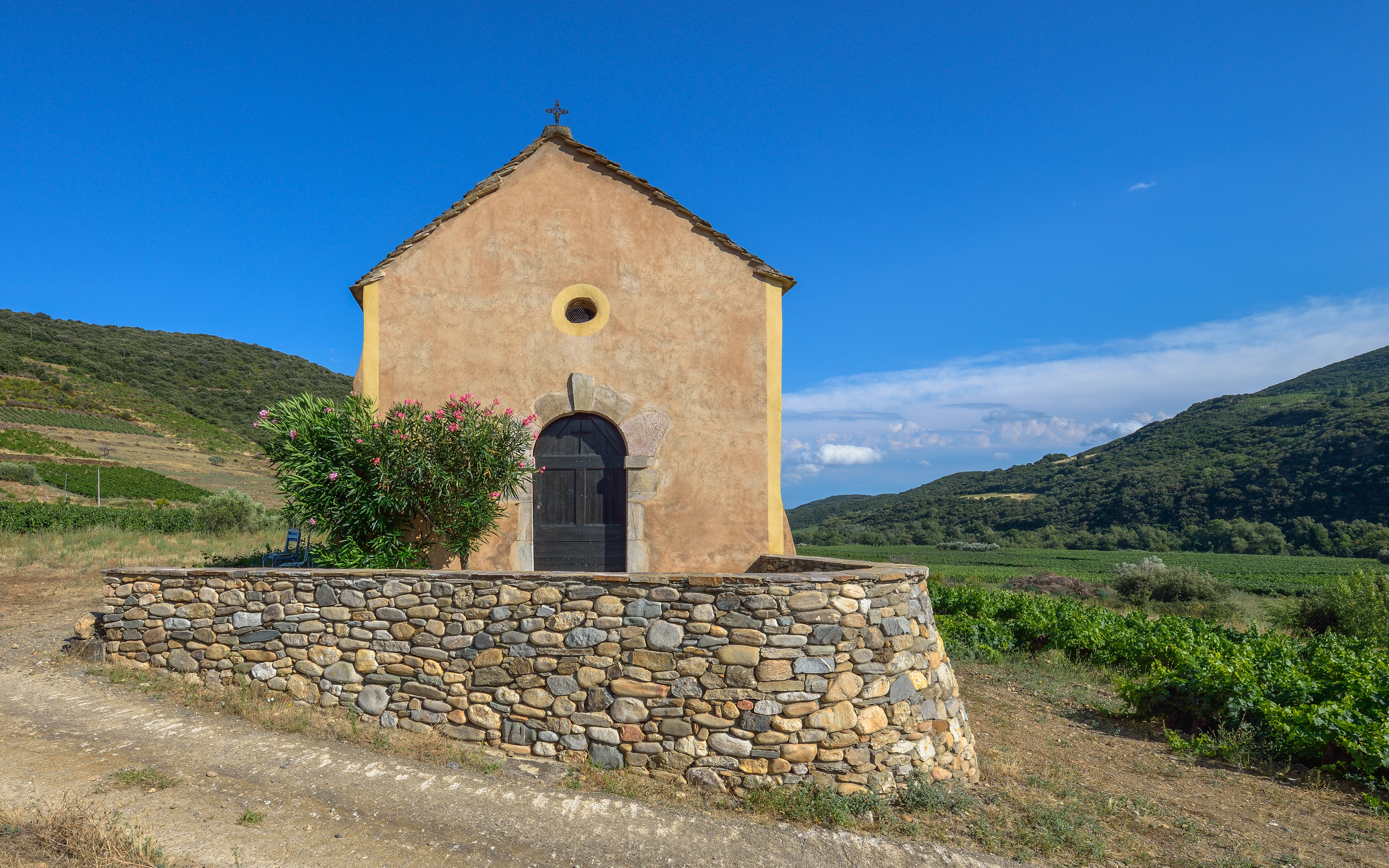
Chapel of Saint-Pontien

There are neolithic sites nearby and the Romans occupied the region. While there are no apparent traces of that occupation today, there is mention of a fortified Roman encampment here. The origins of the village are about 3 km (2 mi) away in the Prieure of St Andre which includes a chapel of AD 600 and also the ruins of a Roman villa. St Andre walked from Italy and is said to have taken with him orange saplings which he planted at the site. It is believed that the Tour de Guep, originally part of a larger fortified castle, was built around 900 AD by the Carolingian rulers to protect from barbarian and Saracen invaders from the south. The tower is the main image on the Roquebrun coat of arms, and dominates the village. There are numerous similar towers that remain in the area. It has recently been restored and returned to what is believed to be its original configuration. There were conflicts in the area up to and through the 1789 revolution and beyond, including noteworthy conflicts between the Cathars (who were considered heretics) and the Roman Catholic Church. Those conflicts are well documented and include the destruction of Béziers by the Catholic forces in 1209.

The village was dominated by several powerful competing families. The poor majority found a living from the poor soil of the hills by raising sheep and goats, fishing, olives, vines and flour from sweet chestnuts. The population was much reduced by the black plague and subsequently by tuberculosis and cholera. The population grew rapidly from about 1800 and was supported by the economy of wine production from the 1820s until the phylloxera infection of the vines in the 1890s. Phylloxera was brought through imported vines from the United States, where it is endemic. All French vines are now grafted onto Native American grape rootstock. Rail transport was the means to distribute the wine internally and to the ports. Spanish workers began to settle in Roquebrun from about 1850 and refugees from the civil war settled in the late 1930s.

== Geology ==
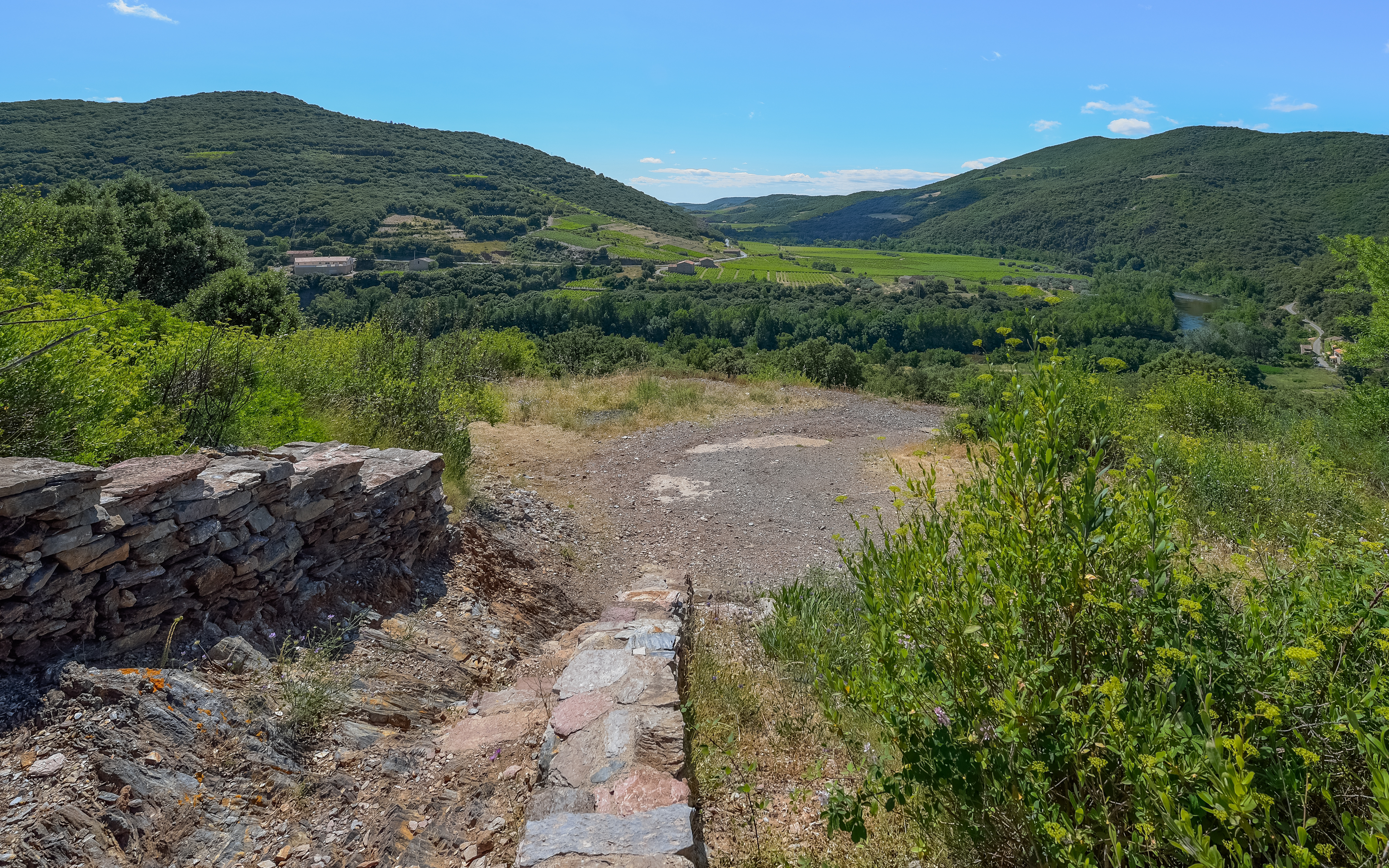
Orb Valley

The hills and valleys of Roquebrun are formed on a fold from the north east and a recumbent fold from the south west. The exposed hard rocks are Ordovician schist and Devonian dolomite. The dolomite forms a vertical ridge upon which the 8th century fortification tower is situated. The junction of the two folds is the valley leading to the hamlet of Laurenque.

== Population ==
Historical population
Year	Pop.	±% p.a.
1968	663	—
1975	569	−2.16%
1982	573	+0.10%
1990	550	−0.51%
1999	576	+0.51%
2007	540	−0.80%
2012	577	+1.33%
2017	605	+0.95%
2023	601	−0.11%
Source: INSEE

In the summer vacation the population sometimes reaches 3,000.

== Economy ==
The main economy is based on the wine production of the cave cooperative, Les Vins de Roquebrun, and seven private producers. Fruit and vegetables add to the economy. There are resident artisans, artists, musicians and writers and a variety of professionals but the nearest doctor is 5 km (3.1 mi) away in the next and larger village. There are two restaurants, a wine bar, a grocery store, a bar, newsagent and baker. Accommodation may be found in gites, at the chambre d'hôtes, Les Mimosas, and at the camping-hotel, Le Nice. There is a small market on Friday mornings. In the summer the river is busy with the kayaks and canoes supplied by a Roquebrun enterprise, Grandeur Nature.

== Activities ==
Roquebrun has a wide variety of sporting and cultural associations open to all. Each year, on the second Sunday of February Roquebrun celebrates the flowering of its many Mimosa trees. It hosts several other festivals, special markets (for instance of regional food and of pottery), concerts, dances and feasts. Hunting the wild boar opens on August 15 and closes in mid-January.

== Gallery ==
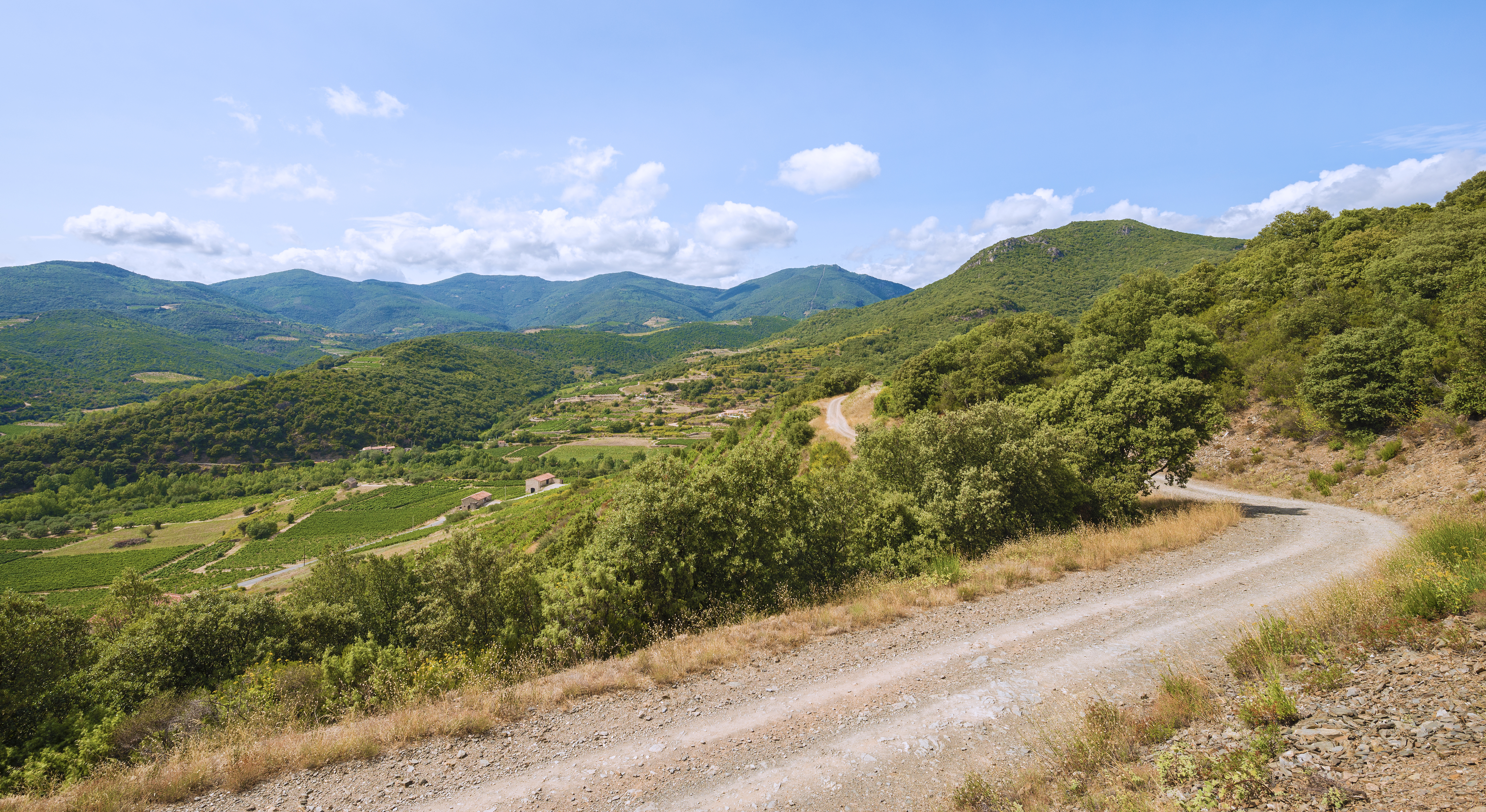
Orb Valley

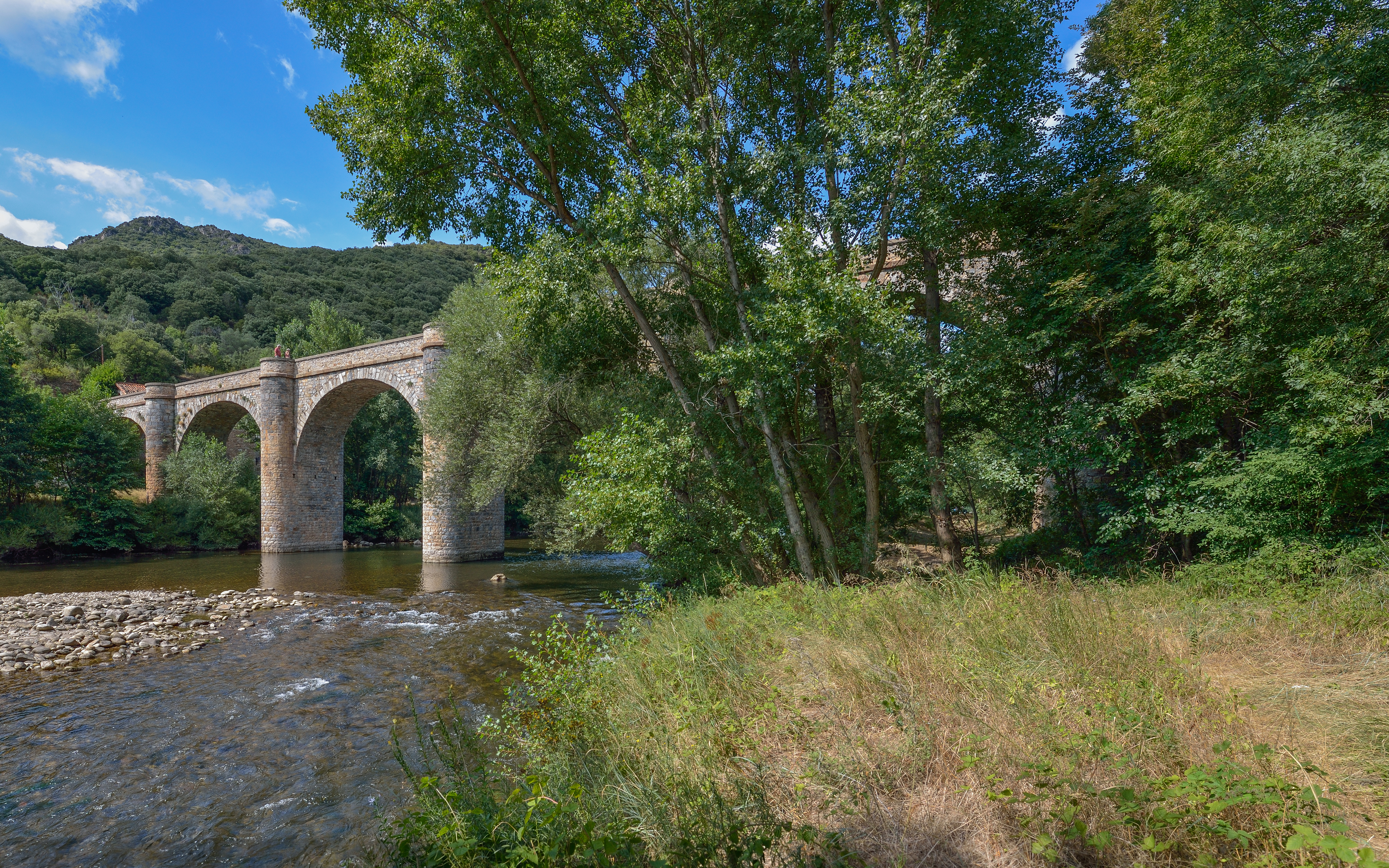
Bridge of Ceps

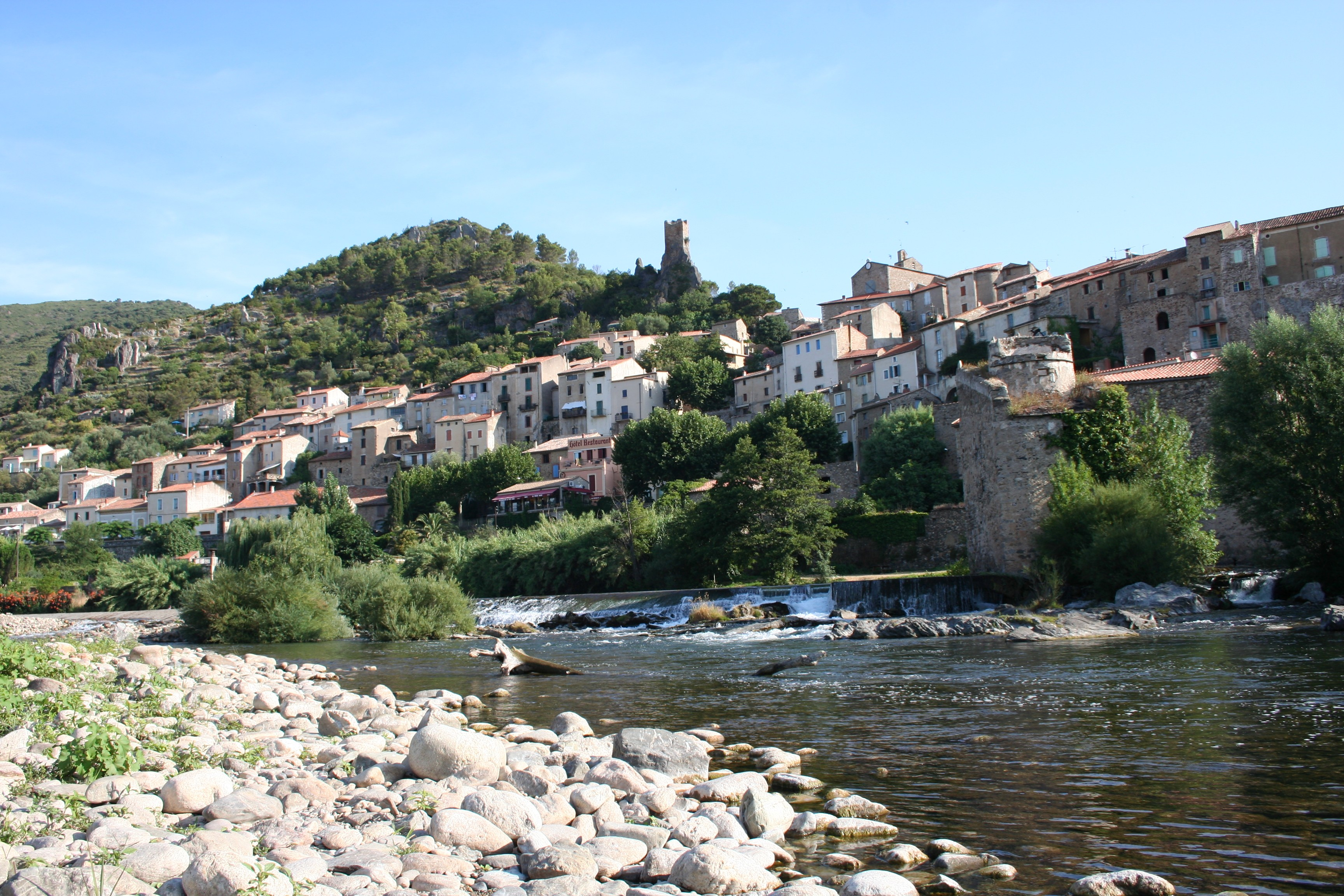
Overview

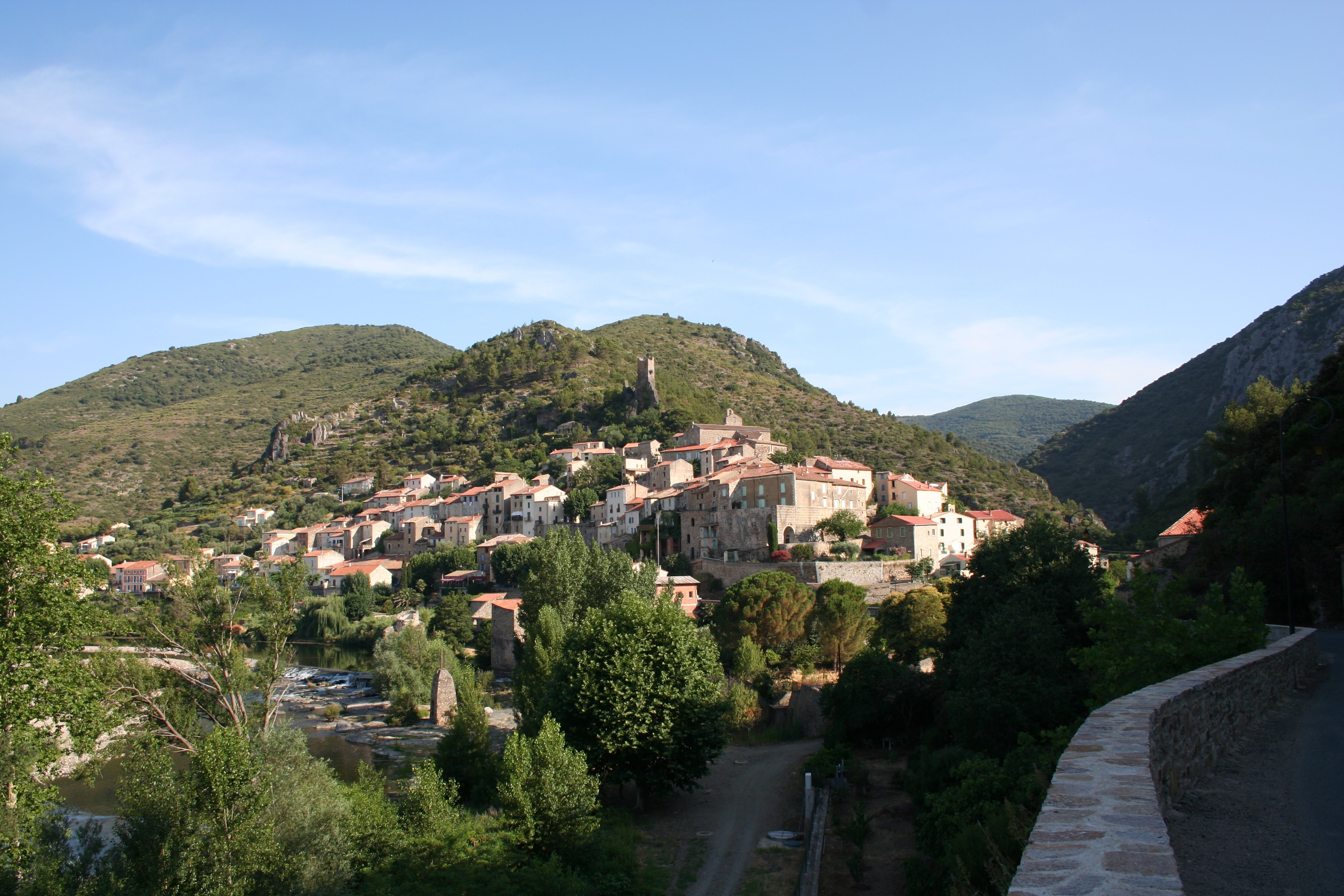
Overview

== See also ==
- Communes of the Hérault department
