= Ausuciates =

Gallic tribe

The Ausuciates (Gaulish: *Ausuciatis) were a small Gallic tribe dwelling around present-day Ossuccio, on the western shore of Lake Como, during the Roman period.

== Name ==
They are mentioned as Ausuciatium on an inscription dated to the early 1st millennium AD and found in Ossuccio (Ausucum).

The ethnonym Ausuciates may be derived from the Gaulish root aus(i)- ('ear'), and possibly translated as 'those having big ears'. It could be compared with the Old Irish óach ('with big ears'), from an earlier *ausākos. Alternatively, it may be derived from a hypothetical deity named *Ausucos ('The Golden One'), from the root *aus- ('gold'). The place-name Ausucum has been translated as the 'domain of *Ausucos'.

== Geography ==
The Ausuciates dwelled on the western shore of Lake Como, around the settlement of Ausucum (modern Ossuccio). The Barrington Atlas locates their territory north of the Gallianates and Insubres, northeast of the Subinates, east of the Orobii, and south the Aneuniates.
