= Lamalou-les-Bains =

Commune in Hérault department, France

- Commune
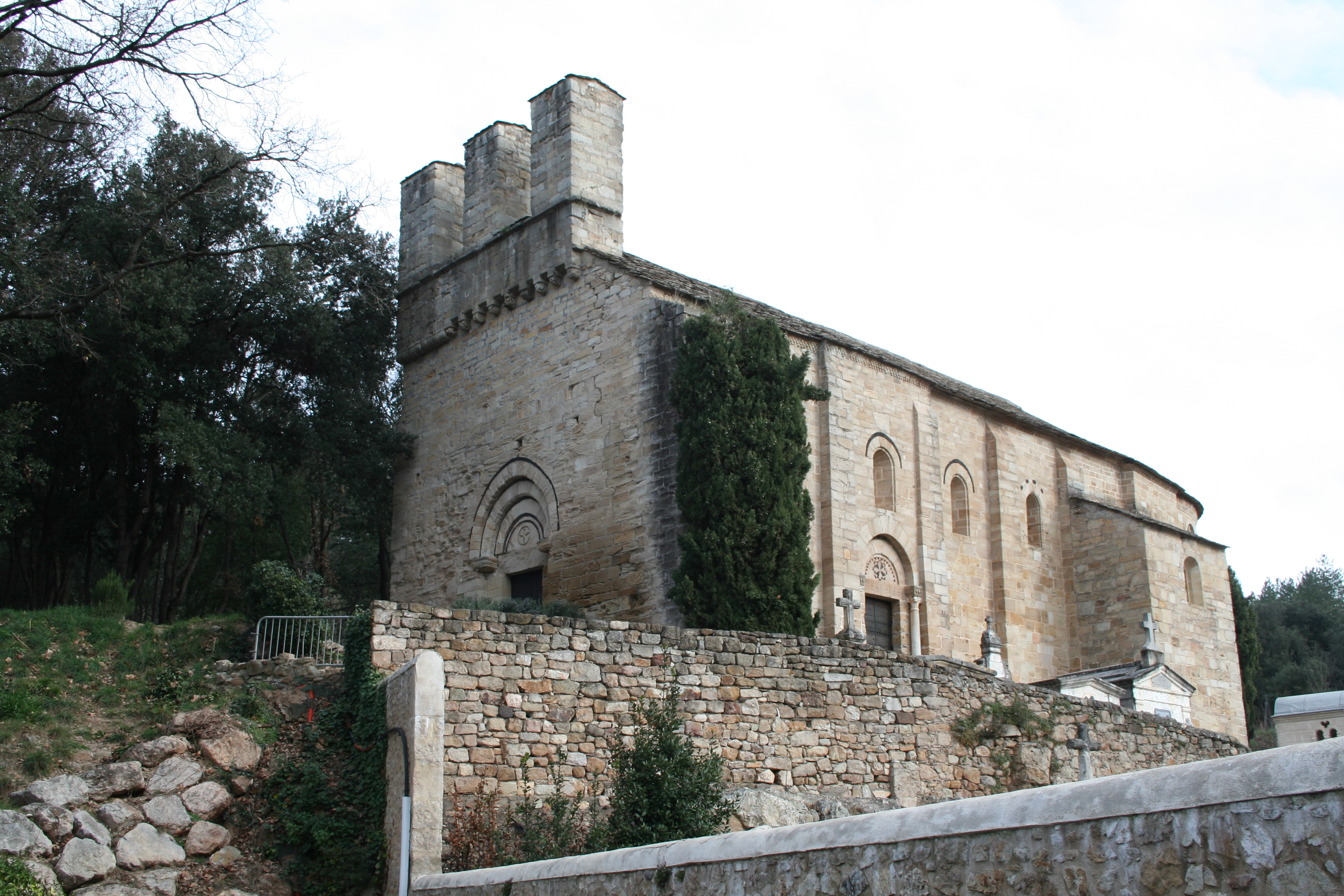
- Saint-Pierre-de-Rhèdes church

- Coat of arms
- Location of Lamalou-les-Bains
- Location within France Location within Occitanie
- Coordinates: 43°35′55″N 3°04′50″E
- Country: France
- Region: Occitania
- Department: Hérault
- Arrondissement: Béziers
- Canton: Clermont-l'Hérault

Government
  - Mayor (2020–2026): Guillaume Dalery
- Area^{1}: 6.18 km^{2} (2.39 sq mi)
- Elevation: 600 m (2,000 ft)
- Highest elevation: 458 m (1,503 ft)
- Lowest elevation: 175 m (574 ft)
- Population (2023): 2,389
  - Density: 387/km^{2} (1,000/sq mi)
- Time zone: UTC+01:00 (CET)
  - Summer (DST): UTC+02:00 (CEST)
- INSEE/Postal code: 34126 /34240
- ^{1} French Land Register data, which excludes lakes, ponds, glaciers > 1 km^{2} (0.386 sq mi or 247 acres) and river estuaries.

Lamalou-les-Bains (French pronunciation: [lamalu le bɛ̃]; Languedocien: L’Amalon) is a commune in the Hérault département in the Occitanie region in southern France.

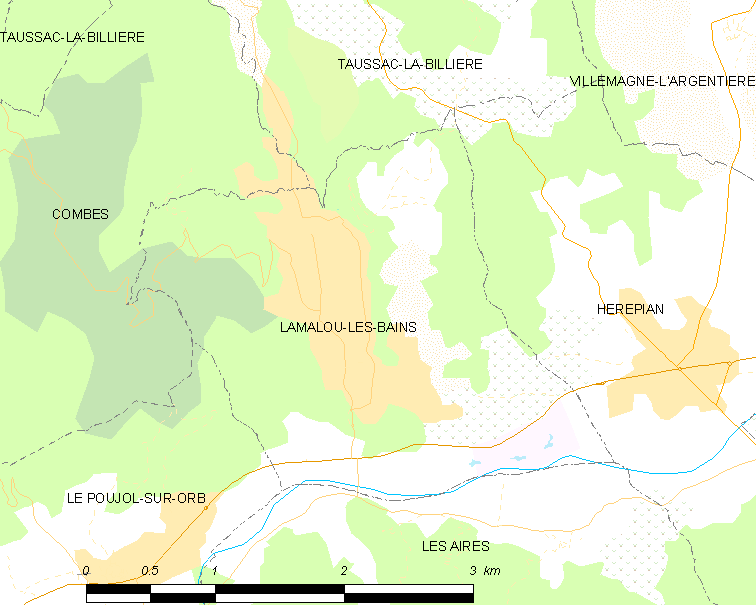
Map

== Geography ==
Lamalou-les-Bains is located 53½ miles west of Montpellier in the Orb valley of the southern Cévennes. The village lies at an altitude of 200 metres and offers commanding views of the rivers, lakes and mountains situated in Haut Languedoc.

== Population ==
Its inhabitants are called Lamalousiens in French.

Historical population
| Year | Pop. | ±% p.a. |
|---|---|---|
| 1968 | 2,029 | — |
| 1975 | 2,067 | +0.27% |
| 1982 | 2,202 | +0.91% |
| 1990 | 2,194 | −0.05% |
| 1999 | 2,156 | −0.19% |
| 2007 | 2,256 | +0.57% |
| 2012 | 2,663 | +3.37% |
| 2017 | 2,509 | −1.18% |
| 2023 | 2,389 | −0.81% |
Source: INSEE

== Spa ==
The waters, which are both hot and cold, are used in cases of rheumatism, sciatica, locomotor ataxia and nervous maladies.

== International relations ==
Lamalou-les-Bains is twinned with:

- Leutkirch im Allgäu, Germany
- Misasa, Japan
- Yaoundé, Cameroon

== Festival ==
Lamalou-les-Bains hosts an annual Operetta Festival in the months of July and August.

== See also ==
- Communes of the Hérault department
