= Bromanenses =

Conjectured ancient community of Transpadane Italy

The Bromanenses were the inhabitants of an ancient village (vicus) in Transpadana (Cisalpine Gaul), in the area of the modern village of Brumano, in northern Italy. The name is not directly attested: it rests on a restored reading of a single fragmentary inscription, in which the vicani Bro[...] have been supplemented as Bro[manensibus] on the strength of the nearby place-name Brumano.

== Name ==
The name is known only from the fragmentary inscription CIL V 5203, from Transpadana, which records the villagers (vicani) as together with the neighbouring Anesiates. The legible portion reads [...] qui uicanis Bro[man(ensibus) et?] Anesiatibus pratu[m ...].

The form Bromanenses is a modern restoration not attested elsewhere. The supplement was prompted only by the presence of a modern village named Brumano about 1 km away. Alexander Falileyev writes that, were it Celtic and of late formation, the name would perhaps belong with the Celtic root *brog- ('borderland, territory').

== Location and interpretation ==
The community is identified with the modern village of Brumano, a hamlet in the comune of Alzano Lombardo in Val Seriana (Province of Bergamo) adjacent to Nese, whose inhabitants the inscription names as the Anesiates.

Gian Piero Bognetti interpreted the Bromanenses and Anesiates as instances of continuity between an ancient village community and the later rural commune (comune rurale), the Bromanenses corresponding to the people of Brumano and the Anesiates to those of Nese.
