= Anesiates =

Ancient community of Transpadane Italy

The Anesiates were the inhabitants of an ancient village (vicus) in Transpadana (Cisalpine Gaul), in the area of the modern village of Nese, in northern Italy. They are attested in a fragmentary inscription, which records them together with the neighbouring Bromanenses of Brumano.

== Name ==
The name is known from the fragmentary inscription CIL V 5203, from Transpadana, in which the villagers (vicani) are recorded in the dative as Anesiatibus. The legible portion reads [...] qui uicanis Bro[man(ensibus) et?] Anesiatibus pratu[m ...]. Unlike the neighbouring Bromanensibus, which is an editorial restoration, the form Anesiatibus is preserved on the stone.

== Location and interpretation ==
The community is identified with the modern village of Nese, a hamlet in the comune of Alzano Lombardo in Val Seriana (Province of Bergamo). The inscription pairs it with the Bromanenses of neighbouring Brumano.

Gian Piero Bognetti interpreted the Anesiates and Bromanenses as instances of continuity between an ancient village community and the later rural commune (comune rurale), the Anesiates corresponding to the people of Nese and the Bromanenses to those of Brumano.
