= Gennanates =

Ancient Gallic tribe

The Gennanates were an ancient tribe living in the area of modern Sarezzo (Lombardy), near Brescia, during the Roman era.

== Name ==
They are mentioned in an inscription from a wall plaque at Palazzo Avogadro (Zanano), which reads Bitionis f(ilio) Gennanati viro suo.

According to Alexander Falileyev, the "Celticity of the [ethnic name Gennanates] is not transparent. It allows several possible interpretations, mere guesswork".

== Geography ==
The Gennanates lived in the area of Zanano, a district of Sarezzo, north of Brescia, between Lake Iseo and Lake Garda.
