= Le Poujol-sur-Orb =

- Commune
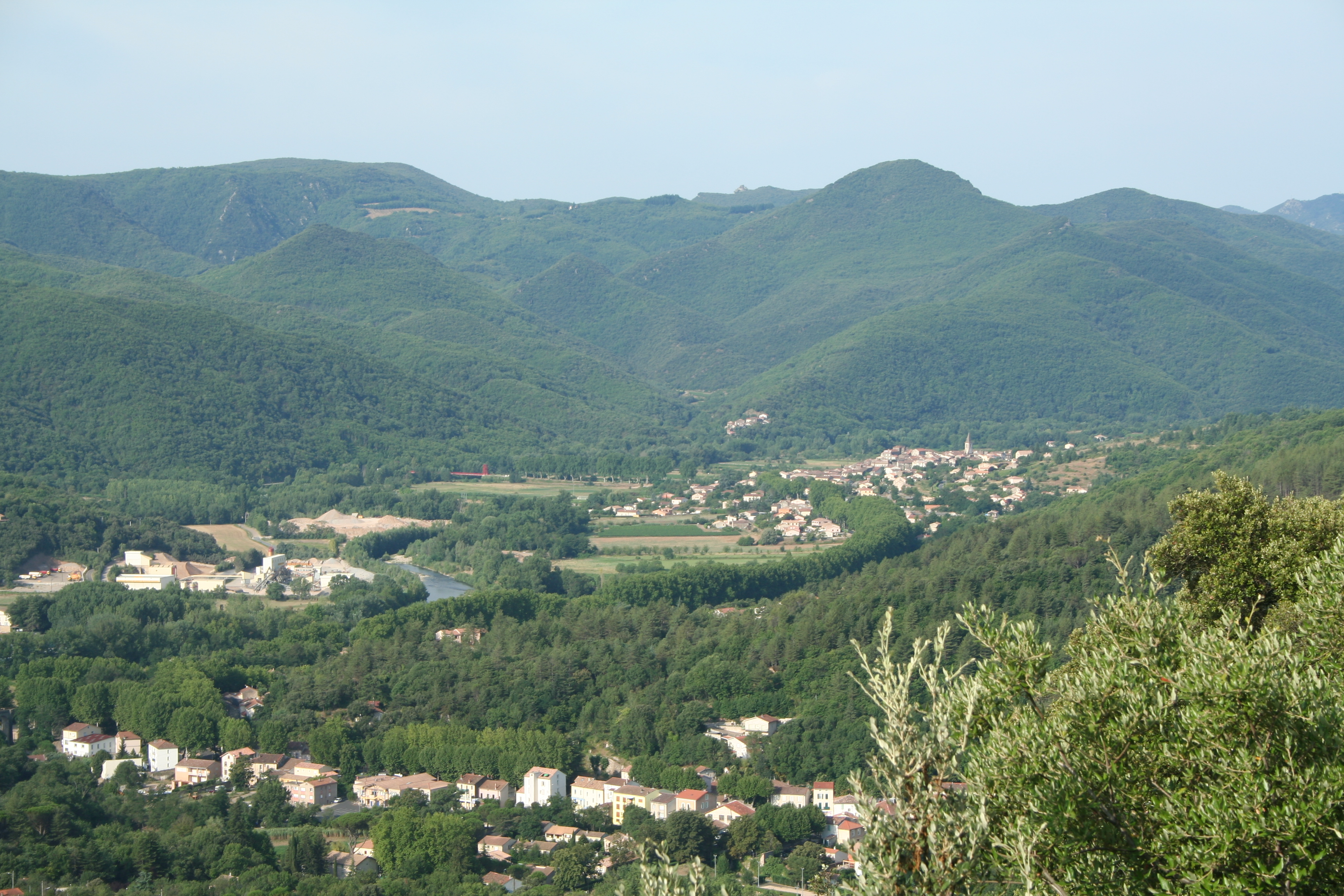
- A general view of Le Poujol-sur-Orb

- Coat of arms
- Location of Le Poujol-sur-Orb
- Location within France Location within Occitanie
- Coordinates: 43°34′50″N 3°03′41″E
- Country: France
- Region: Occitania
- Department: Hérault
- Arrondissement: Béziers
- Canton: Clermont-l'Hérault

Government
  - Mayor (2020–2026): Yves Robin
- Area^{1}: 4.58 km^{2} (1.77 sq mi)
- Elevation: 180 m (590 ft)
- Highest elevation: 380 m (1,250 ft)
- Lowest elevation: 162 m (531 ft)
- Population (2023): 947
  - Density: 207/km^{2} (536/sq mi)
- Time zone: UTC+01:00 (CET)
  - Summer (DST): UTC+02:00 (CEST)
- INSEE/Postal code: 34211 /34600
- ^{1} French Land Register data, which excludes lakes, ponds, glaciers > 1 km^{2} (0.386 sq mi or 247 acres) and river estuaries.

Le Poujol-sur-Orb (French pronunciation: [lə puʒɔl syʁ ɔʁb], literally Le Poujol on Orb; Occitan: Lo Pojòl) is a commune in the Hérault department in the Occitanie region in southern France.

Le Poujol-sur-Orb is a rural commune with a population of 944 in 2022. It is part of the Bédarieux urban area and the greater Bédarieux catchment area. Its inhabitants are called Poujolais and Poujolaises.

== Toponym ==
The commune was known under the variants: castrum de Pojols (1164), castro de Poiol (1247), de Pujolio (1271), seigneur de Pujol (1529), etc.

The name Poujol derives from the Occitan pojòl which comes from the Latin podiolum, meaning which is "small hill".

== Population ==
Historical population
Year	Pop.	±% p.a.
1968	876	—
1975	826	−0.84%
1982	825	−0.02%
1990	905	+1.16%
1999	890	−0.19%
2007	1,045	+2.03%
2012	1,033	−0.23%
2017	1,083	+0.95%
2023	947	−2.21%
Source: INSEE

== See also ==
- Communes of the Hérault department
