= Taussac-la-Billière =

Commune in southern france

- Commune
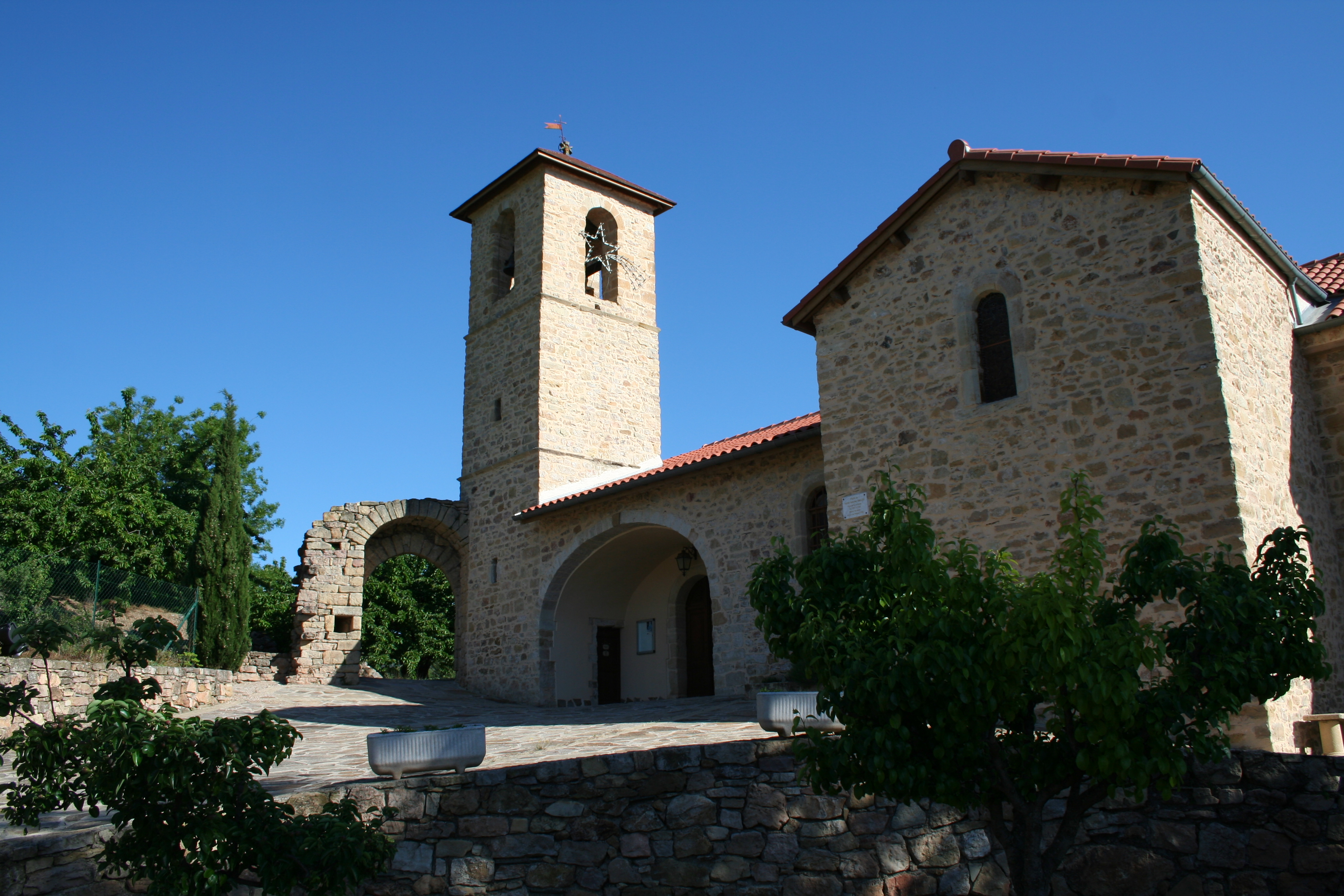
- The church of Taussac-la-Billière

- Coat of arms
- Location of Taussac-la-Billière
- Location within France Location within Occitanie
- Coordinates: 43°37′20″N 3°04′19″E
- Country: France
- Region: Occitania
- Department: Hérault
- Arrondissement: Béziers
- Canton: Clermont-l'Hérault

Government
  - Mayor (2020–2026): Bernard Vinches
- Area^{1}: 14.62 km^{2} (5.64 sq mi)
- Elevation: 230 m (750 ft)
- Highest elevation: 700 m (2,300 ft)
- Lowest elevation: 199 m (653 ft)
- Population (2023): 460
  - Density: 31/km^{2} (81/sq mi)
- Time zone: UTC+01:00 (CET)
  - Summer (DST): UTC+02:00 (CEST)
- INSEE/Postal code: 34308 /34600
- ^{1} French Land Register data, which excludes lakes, ponds, glaciers > 1 km^{2} (0.386 sq mi or 247 acres) and river estuaries.

Taussac-la-Billière (French pronunciation: [tosak la biljɛʁ]; Occitan: Tauçac) is a commune in the Hérault department in the Occitanie region in southern France.

== Population ==
Historical population
Year	Pop.	±% p.a.
1968	219	—
1975	213	−0.40%
1982	259	+2.83%
1990	330	+3.07%
1999	352	+0.72%
2007	423	+2.32%
2012	471	+2.17%
2017	446	−1.08%
2023	460	+0.52%
Source: INSEE

== Personalities linked to the commune ==
- Antoine Salles, village priest between 1747 and 1793, victim of the French Revolution in 1794.

== See also ==
- Communes of the Hérault department
