= Via Regina =

Roman road from Cremona to Milan

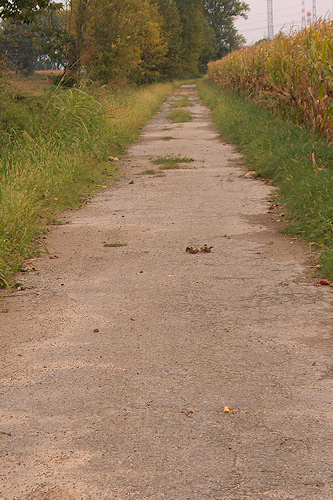
A stretch of the Via Regina that has not been modernized

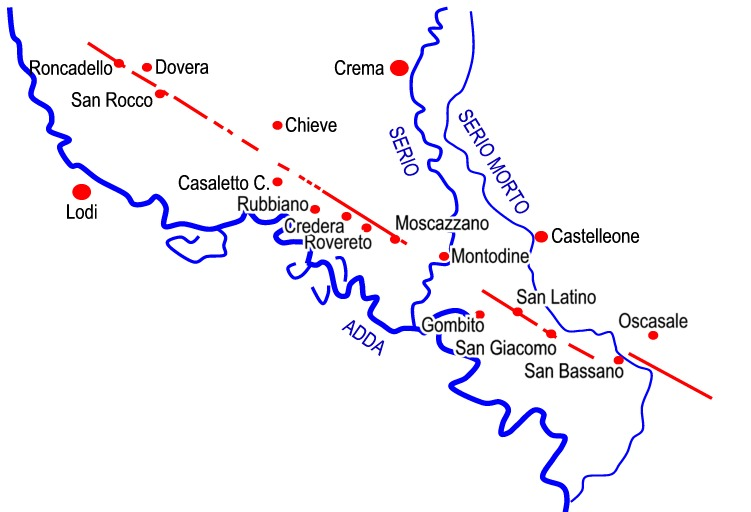
Map of the Via Regina from Roncadello to San Bassano with ancillary paths

Via Regina (Latin: Antica Strada Regina) is the old Roman road which ran from Cremona to Milan. It was based on an earlier trade route. the total length of the road was about 75 kilometres (47 mi) Associated with it was the road along the western shore of Lake Como across the Milanese plain, that linked up with Valchiavenna.

The name "Via Regina" (strada regia, royal road, hence main road) was given to it much later on and is first documented in the year 1187. Together with the waterway of Lake Como and the Po River, the Via Regina and associated paths were used by sailors, soldiers and merchants, as well as local traffic, with parts of it being suitable for vehicles, some just mule tracks, and a few pedestrian only paths. For centuries it constituted a true "Lake Como system", an articulate network of routes pointing northwards, to the Alpine passes, and southwards, towards Milan, the hub for the Po Valley.
