= Aneuniates =

Gallic tribe

The Aneuniates (Gaulish: *Aneuniatis) were a small Gallic tribe dwelling near Lake Como, around present-day Samolaco, during the Roman period.

== Name ==
They are mentioned Aneuniates on an inscription dated to the 2nd century AD and found in Gera Lario.

The ethnonym Aneuniates can be derived from the Gaulish aneun- ('inspired') attached to the suffix -ates ('belonging to'), although the etymology of the first element remains unclear. Xavier Delamarre has proposed to posit a deity named *Aneunos ('The Inspired'), with Aneuniates as 'those of *Aneunos'.

== Geography ==
The Aneuniates dwelled on the northern shores of Lake Como, around the settlement of Summus Lacus (modern Samolaco). The Barrington Atlas locates their territory north of the Ausuciates and Orobii, and south of the Bergalei.
