= Subinates =

Ancient community of Roman-era Ticino

The Subinates were the inhabitants of a vicus in the area of modern Riva San Vitale (Canton Ticino), in present-day southern Switzerland, during the Roman era.

== Name ==
The community is known from a fragmentary and heavily restored Latin inscription (Pais 1287), in which the villagers are named in the dative as [vic(anis?)] Primo subinatibus.

Alexander Falileyev observes that its Celticity is uncertain. If Celtic, it may be formed with the prefix su- ('good').

The inscription, which is undated, records a bequest by a magistrate (quattuorvir iure dicundo) of Comum to the vicani, who in return were to maintain his memory each year with roses and garlands, subject to a penalty clause.

== Geography ==
The community was located around Riva San Vitale, at the southern end of Lake Lugano, in the Mendrisiotto of Canton Ticino.
