= Saint-Gervais-sur-Mare =

- Commune
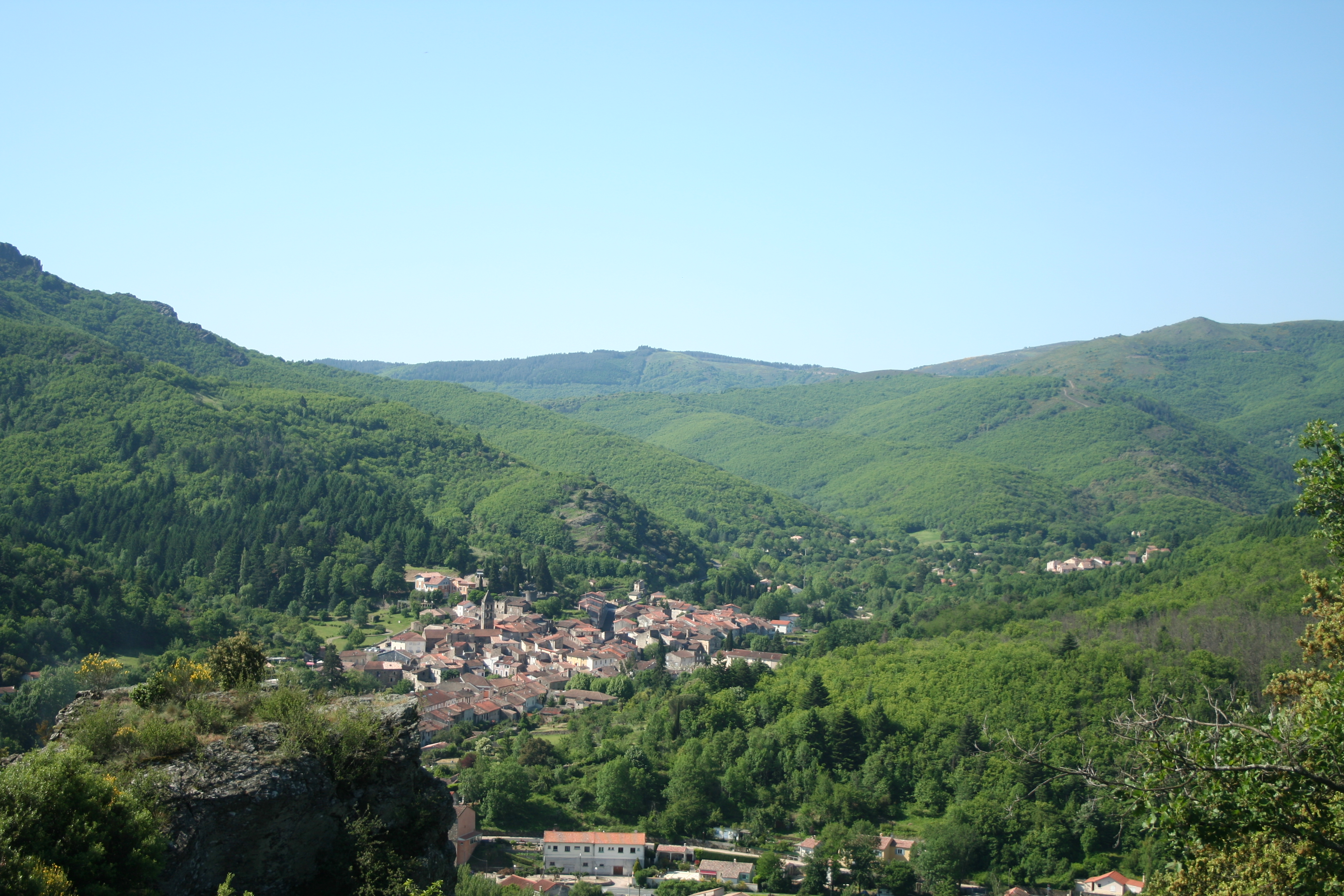
- A general view of Saint-Gervais-sur-Mare

- Coat of arms
- Location of Saint-Gervais-sur-Mare
- Location within France Location within Occitanie
- Coordinates: 43°39′10″N 3°02′27″E
- Country: France
- Region: Occitania
- Department: Hérault
- Arrondissement: Béziers
- Canton: Clermont-l'Hérault

Government
  - Mayor (2020–2026): Jean-Luc Falip
- Area^{1}: 24.29 km^{2} (9.38 sq mi)
- Elevation: 330 m (1,080 ft)
- Highest elevation: 940 m (3,080 ft)
- Lowest elevation: 280 m (920 ft)
- Population (2023): 859
  - Density: 35.4/km^{2} (91.6/sq mi)
- Time zone: UTC+01:00 (CET)
  - Summer (DST): UTC+02:00 (CEST)
- INSEE/Postal code: 34260 /34610
- ^{1} French Land Register data, which excludes lakes, ponds, glaciers > 1 km^{2} (0.386 sq mi or 247 acres) and river estuaries.

Saint-Gervais-sur-Mare (French pronunciation: [sɛ̃ ʒɛʁvɛ syʁ maʁ], literally Saint-Gervais on Mare; Languedocien: Sant Gervais) is a commune in the Hérault department in the Occitanie region in southern France.

== Population ==
Historical population
| Year | Pop. | ±% p.a. |
|---|---|---|
| 1968 | 873 | — |
| 1975 | 860 | −0.21% |
| 1982 | 859 | −0.02% |
| 1990 | 813 | −0.69% |
| 1999 | 789 | −0.33% |
| 2007 | 803 | +0.22% |
| 2012 | 874 | +1.71% |
| 2017 | 858 | −0.37% |
| 2023 | 859 | +0.02% |
Source: INSEE

== See also ==
- Communes of the Hérault department
