= Rosis =

- Commune
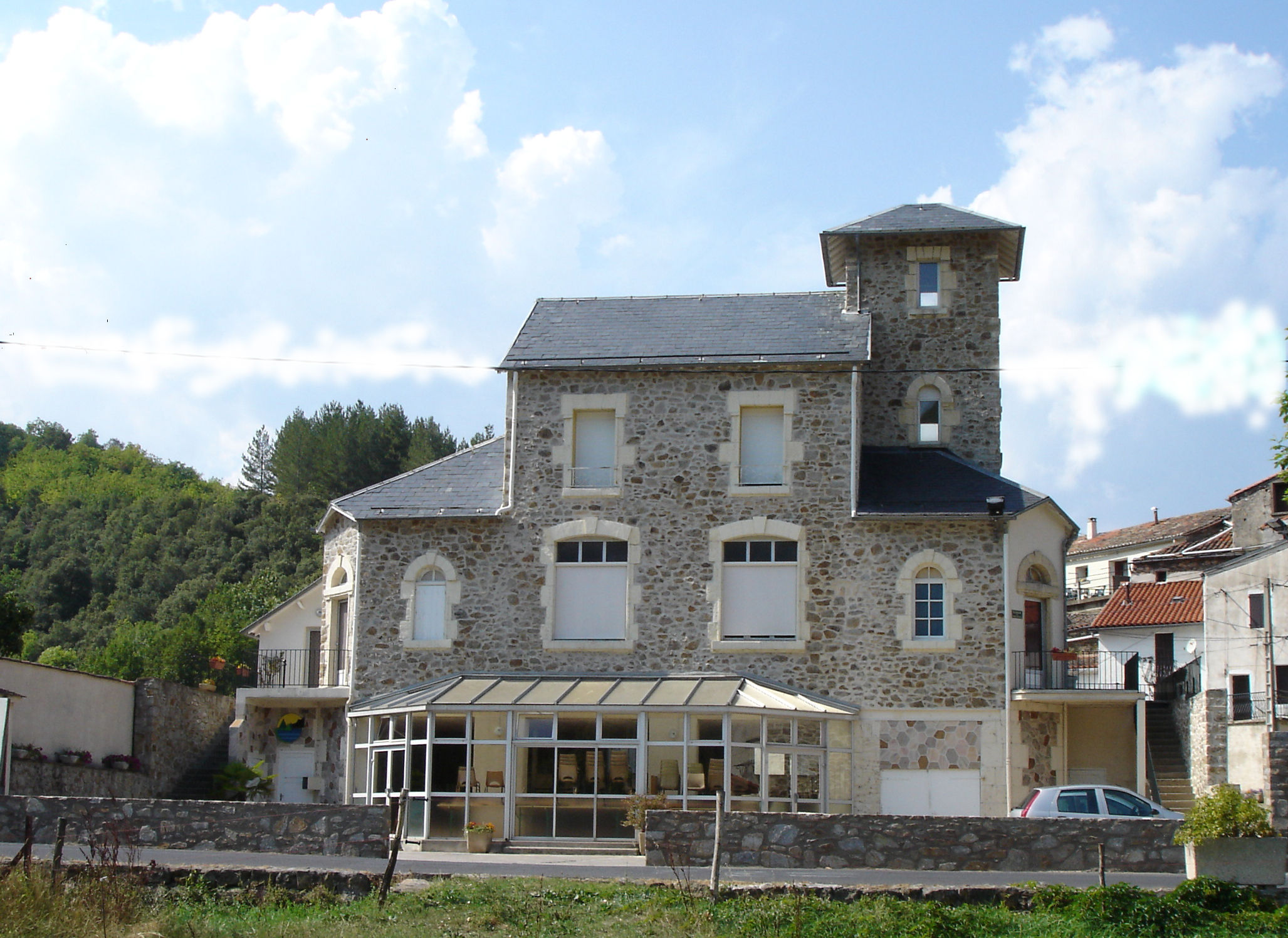
- The town hall of Rosis

- Coat of arms
- Location of Rosis
- Location within France Location within Occitanie
- Coordinates: 43°40′04″N 3°00′17″E
- Country: France
- Region: Occitania
- Department: Hérault
- Arrondissement: Béziers
- Canton: Saint-Pons-de-Thomières
- Intercommunality: CC du Haut-Languedoc

Government
  - Mayor (2020–2026): Anne-Lise Sauterel
- Area^{1}: 52.91 km^{2} (20.43 sq mi)
- Elevation: 380 m (1,250 ft)
- Highest elevation: 1,123 m (3,684 ft)
- Lowest elevation: 272 m (892 ft)
- Population (2023): 279
  - Density: 5.27/km^{2} (13.7/sq mi)
- Time zone: UTC+01:00 (CET)
  - Summer (DST): UTC+02:00 (CEST)
- INSEE/Postal code: 34235 /34610
- ^{1} French Land Register data, which excludes lakes, ponds, glaciers > 1 km^{2} (0.386 sq mi or 247 acres) and river estuaries.

Rosis is a commune in the Hérault department in the Occitanie region in southern France.

== Population ==
Historical population
Year	Pop.	±% p.a.
1968	343	—
1975	269	−3.41%
1982	244	−1.38%
1990	257	+0.65%
1999	261	+0.17%
2007	299	+1.71%
2012	304	+0.33%
2017	287	−1.14%
2023	279	−0.47%
Source: INSEE

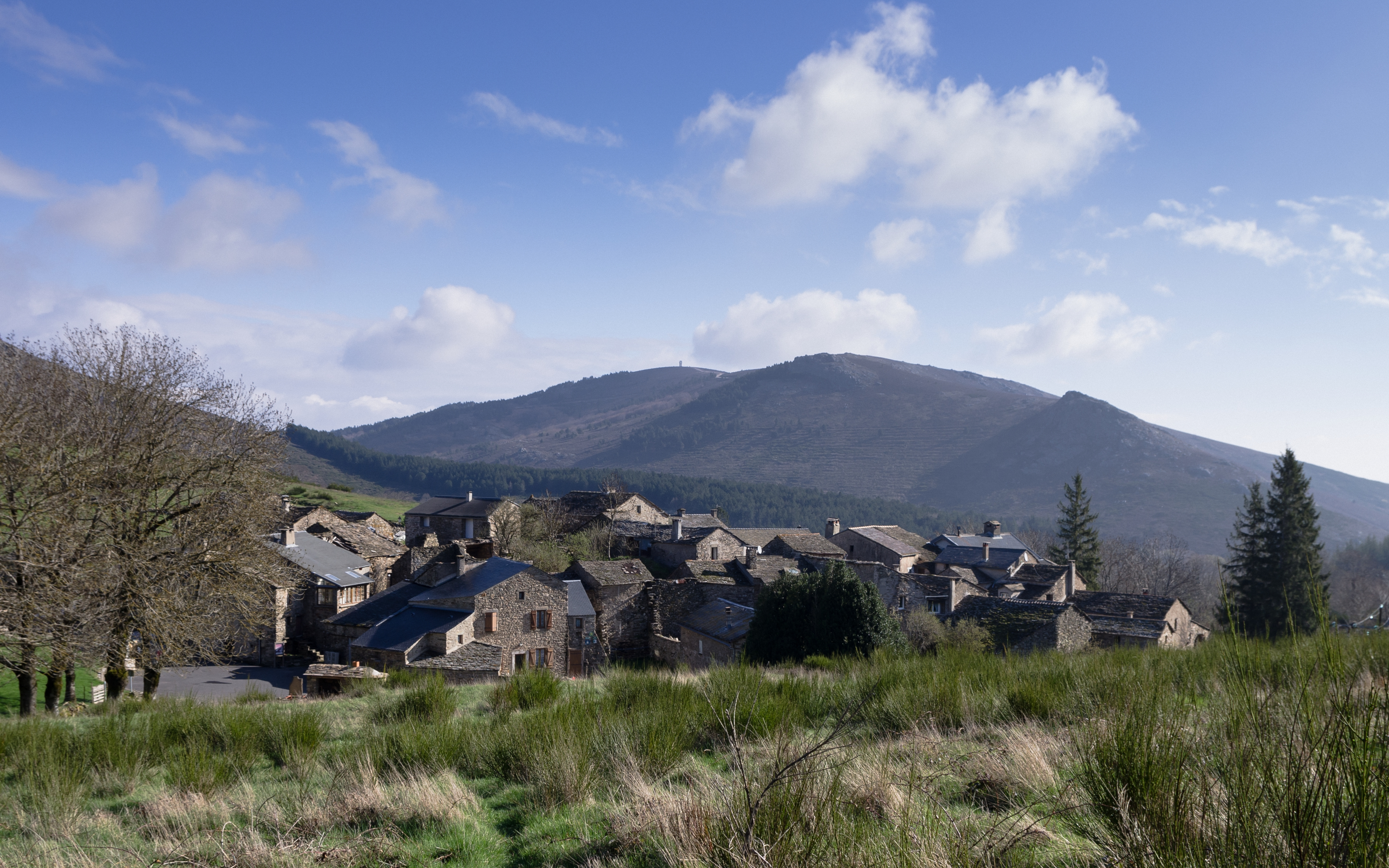
The hamlet of Douch, commune of Rosis

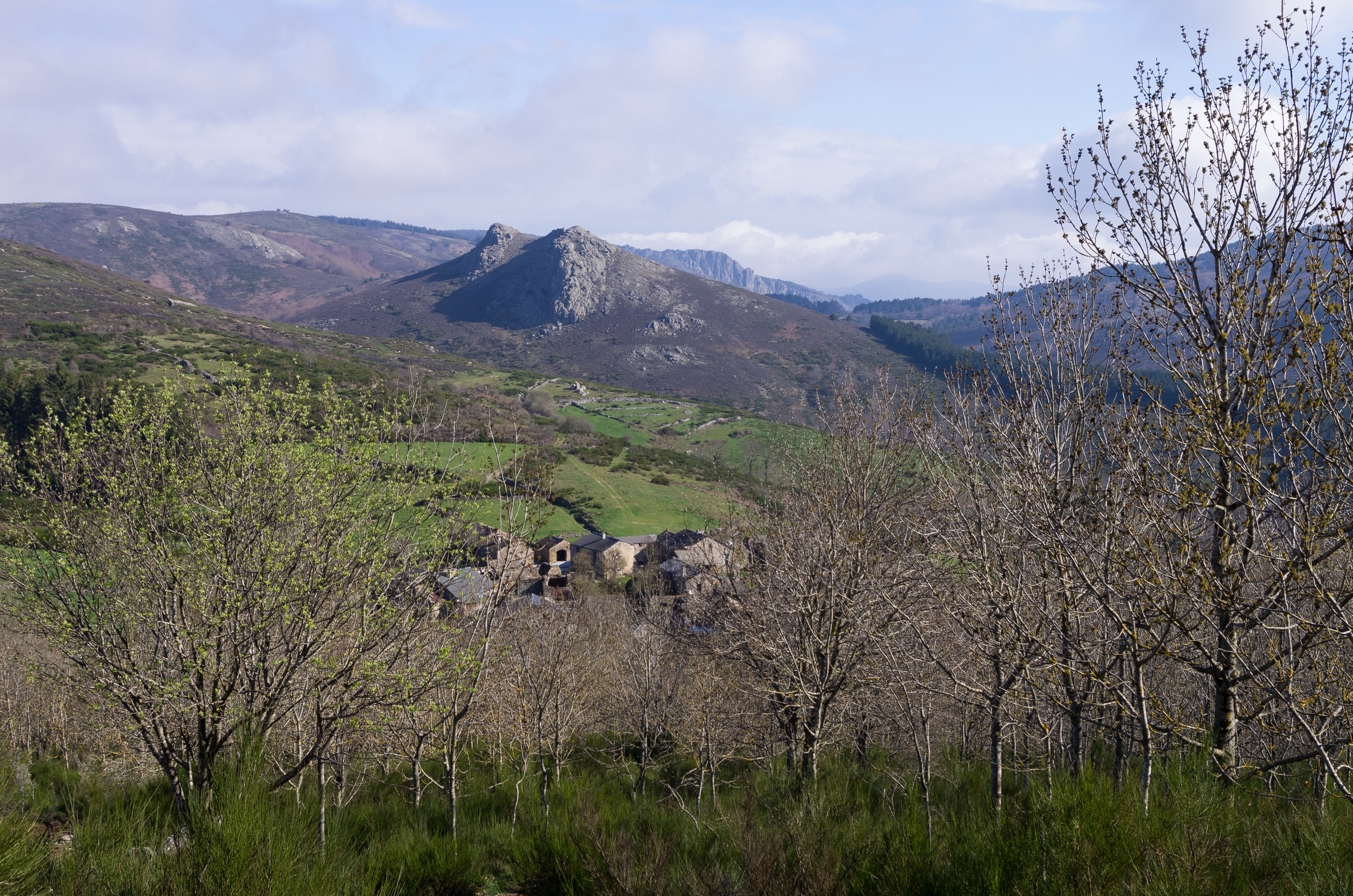
The hamlet of Douch, commune of Rosis

== See also ==
- Communes of the Hérault department
