= Hérépian =

- Commune
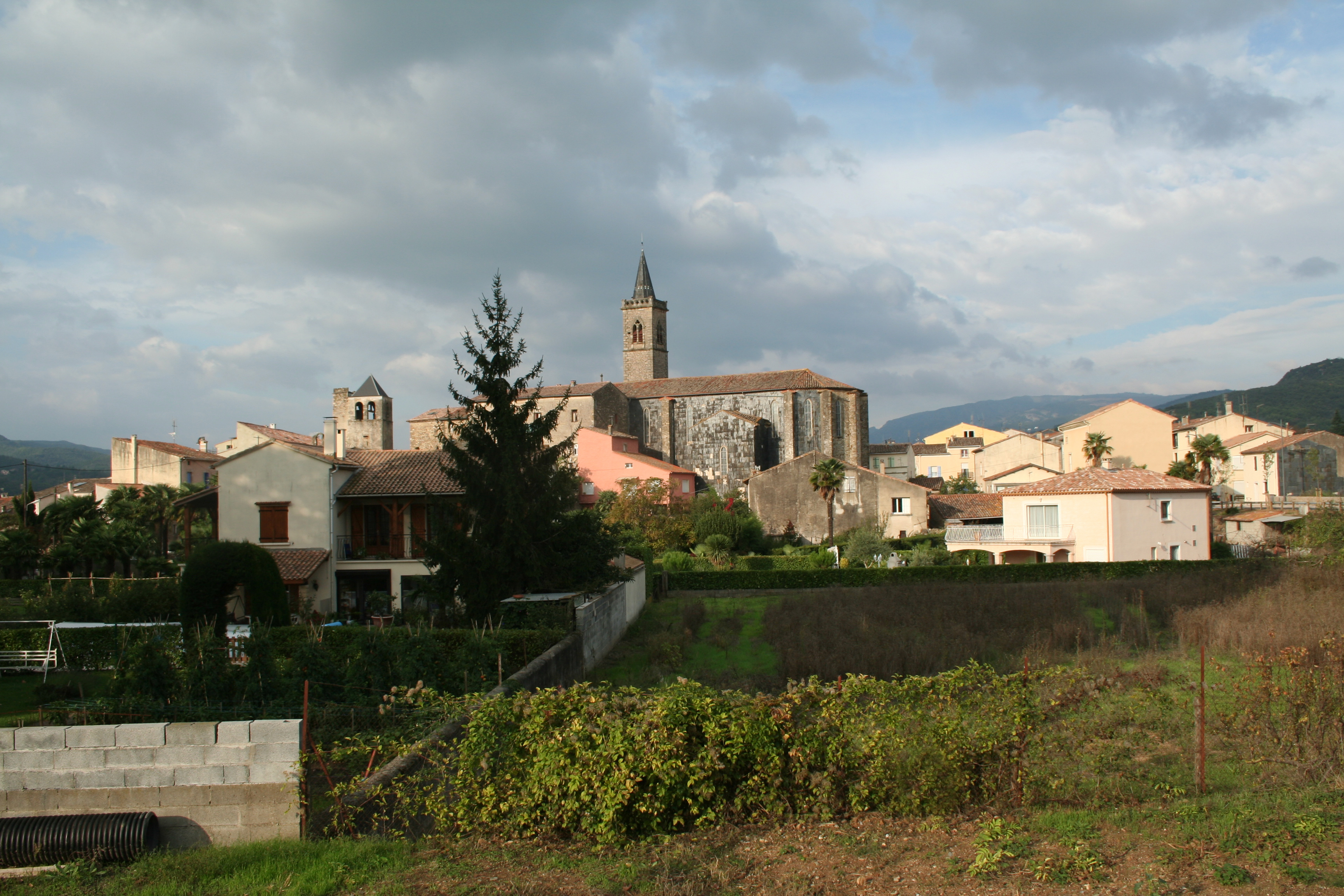
- Hérépian

- Coat of arms
- Location of Hérépian
- Location within France Location within Occitanie
- Coordinates: 43°35′39″N 3°06′58″E
- Country: France
- Region: Occitania
- Department: Hérault
- Arrondissement: Béziers
- Canton: Clermont-l'Hérault
- Intercommunality: Grand Orb

Government
  - Mayor (2020–2026): Jean-Louis Lafaurie
- Area^{1}: 8.77 km^{2} (3.39 sq mi)
- Elevation: 191 m (627 ft)
- Highest elevation: 520 m (1,710 ft)
- Lowest elevation: 178 m (584 ft)
- Population (2023): 1,594
  - Density: 182/km^{2} (471/sq mi)
- Time zone: UTC+01:00 (CET)
  - Summer (DST): UTC+02:00 (CEST)
- INSEE/Postal code: 34119 /34600
- ^{1} French Land Register data, which excludes lakes, ponds, glaciers > 1 km^{2} (0.386 sq mi or 247 acres) and river estuaries.

Hérépian (French pronunciation: [eʁepjɑ̃]; Occitan: Erépia) is a commune in the Hérault département in the Occitanie region in southern France.

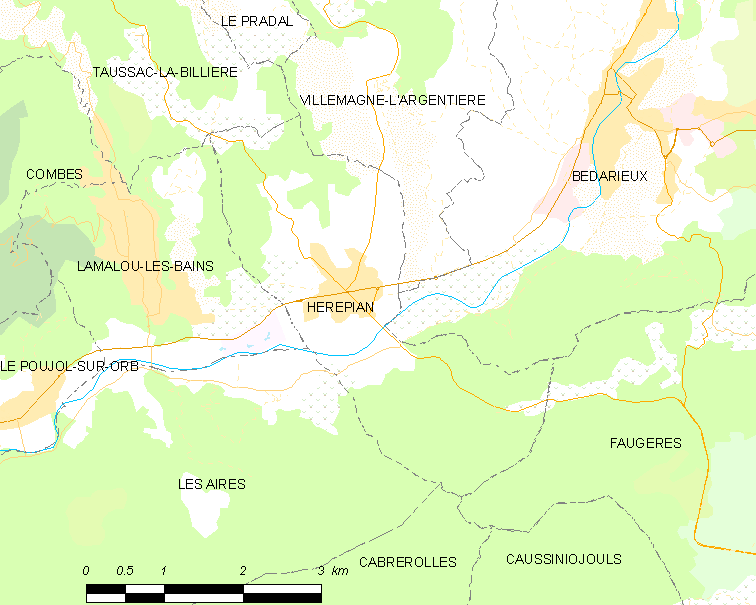
Map

== Population ==
Historical population
Year	Pop.	±% p.a.
1968	1,135	—
1975	1,126	−0.11%
1982	1,157	+0.39%
1990	1,241	+0.88%
1999	1,368	+1.09%
2007	1,458	+0.80%
2012	1,492	+0.46%
2017	1,518	+0.35%
2023	1,594	+0.82%
Source: INSEE

== See also ==
- Communes of the Hérault department
