= Saint-Geniès-de-Varensal =

- Commune
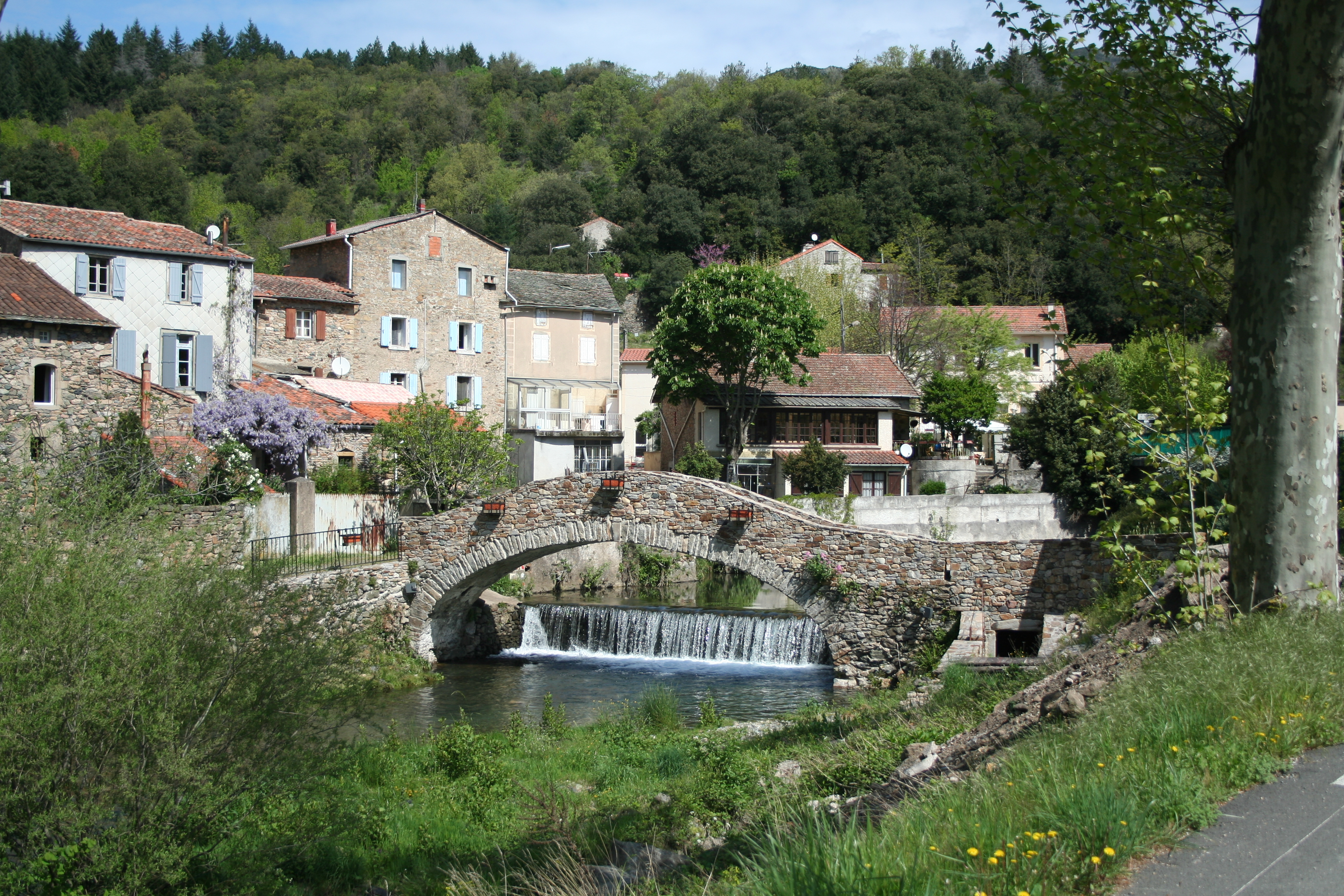
- A general view of Saint-Geniès-de-Varensal

- Coat of arms
- Location of Saint-Geniès-de-Varensal
- Location within France Location within Occitanie
- Coordinates: 43°40′54″N 3°00′12″E
- Country: France
- Region: Occitania
- Department: Hérault
- Arrondissement: Béziers
- Canton: Clermont-l'Hérault

Government
  - Mayor (2020–2026): Jean-Claude Boltz
- Area^{1}: 12.55 km^{2} (4.85 sq mi)
- Elevation: 1,000 m (3,300 ft)
- Highest elevation: 1,086 m (3,563 ft)
- Lowest elevation: 358 m (1,175 ft)
- Population (2023): 202
  - Density: 16.1/km^{2} (41.7/sq mi)
- Time zone: UTC+01:00 (CET)
  - Summer (DST): UTC+02:00 (CEST)
- INSEE/Postal code: 34257 /34610
- ^{1} French Land Register data, which excludes lakes, ponds, glaciers > 1 km^{2} (0.386 sq mi or 247 acres) and river estuaries.

Saint-Geniès-de-Varensal is a commune in the Hérault department in the Occitanie region in southern France.

== Population ==
Historical population
Year	Pop.	±% p.a.
1968	200	—
1975	214	+0.97%
1982	223	+0.59%
1990	207	−0.93%
1999	209	+0.11%
2007	226	+0.98%
2012	198	−2.61%
2017	209	+1.09%
2023	202	−0.57%
Source: INSEE

== See also ==
- Communes of the Hérault department
