= Councils of Aachen =

A number of significant councils of the Latin Church were held at Aachen (also known in French as Aix-la-Chapelle) in the early Middle Ages.

In the mixed council of 798, Charlemagne proclaimed a capitulary of eighty-one chapters, largely a repetition of earlier ecclesiastical legislation, that was accepted by the clergy and acquired canonical authority. At the council of 799, after a discussion of six days Felix (bishop of Urgell) in Spain, avowed himself overcome by Alcuin and withdrew his theory of Adoptionism.

At the council held in 809, the Frankish Church adopted the filioque addition in the Creed (which contributed to the East–West Schism), although Pope Leo III refused to recognize it as valid (and the Church of Rome did not accept this addition until 1014).

In the Synods of Aachen (816–819), clerical and monastic discipline was the chief issue. The council of 816 established the Rule of Aix which was made obligatory on all establishments of canons and canonesses. The later councils imposed a new revision of the Rule of Saint Benedict on the monks of the Benedictine Order by Benedict of Aniane. A list of monasteries and the services to the crown that they owed following these councils can be found in the Notitia de servitio monasteriorum. The synod of 836 was largely attended and devoted itself to the restoration of ecclesiastical discipline that had been affected by the civil wars between Louis the Pious and his sons.

From 860 to 862 three councils were occupied with the question of the divorce of King Lothair II from his wife, Teutberga.

In 1166 took place the schismatic council, approved by the Antipope Paschal III, in which was decreed the canonization of Charlemagne, that was solemnly celebrated 29 December of that year.
