= Notre-Dame de Soissons =

Abbey in Soissons, France

Coordinates: 49.3810°N 3.3284°E

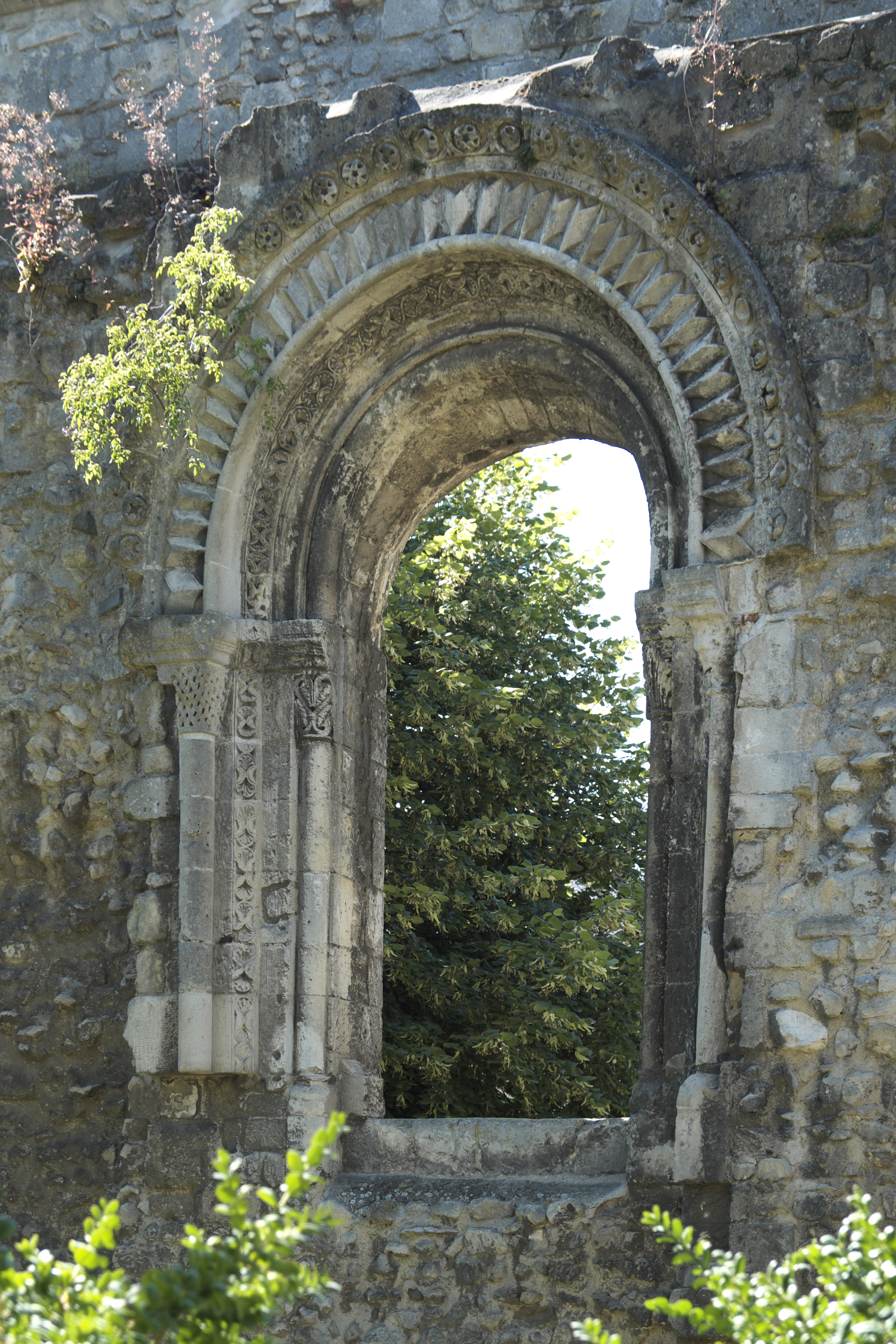
Ruins of the nunnery today

Notre-Dame de Soissons was a nunnery dedicated to the Virgin Mary (Our Lady) in Soissons. It was founded during the Merovingian era, between 658 and 666, but the community was dissolved and the building partially demolished during the French Revolution (1789–99).

The convent was founded by Ebroin, the mayor of the palace under the Merovingian kings, who appointed Aetheria, a nun from Jouarre, as its first abbess. Jouarre had been founded by Ado, a disciple of the Irish missionary Columban, and Notre-Dame therefore stood in the Columbanian tradition of monasticism. In the 660s the nunnery received a monastic rule from the bishop of Soissons, Drauscius. It was a mixta regula, a mixed rule, combining elements of the Benedictine rule and the rule of Columban. The text of this unique rule has not been preserved. During the 660s, the nuns also adopted the practice of the laus perennis (perennial praise), whereby the Psalms were sung constantly, day and night, by alternating groups of singers. This custom was pioneered at the monastery of Saint-Maurice d'Agaune.

During the Carolingian era, the nunnery came under royal control. Charlemagne's daughter Rotrude (died 810) became a nun there, and his sister Gisela became abbess. In 816–17 it adopted the reforms of Benedict of Aniane propounded at the synods of Aix-la-Chapelle. According to the record of monasteries made around that time, the Monasterium sanctae Mariae Suessionis owed the state dona et militia, a monetary gift and military contribution (in the case of a nunnery, paid soldiers). In 858, an inventory (descriptio) of the monastery's possessions was made before the king's leading men (optimates) and signed by fifteen bishops and abbots. The document is preserved. Such inventories were made and confirmed by the king or other leading men to serve as proof and confirmation of possession.

The writer and theologian Paschasius Radbertus was raised at Notre-Dame de Soissons—prior to 803/4, when Charlemagne made illegal the education of boys at nunneries. He dedicated his treatises De assumptione sanctae Mariae virginis to the Abbess Theodrada (abbess 810, died 846), a cousin of Charlemagne, and her daughter, Irma. After Irma succeeded her mother as abbess, Radbertus wrote the Expositio in Psalmum XLIV for the nuns of Soissons. It is an exposition of Psalm 44 as an epithalamium.

== Sources ==
- Lesne, Émile (1920). "Les ordonnances monastiques de Louis le Pieux et la Notitia de servitio monasteriorum". Revue d'histoire de l'église de France. 6 (31): 161–75, 321–38 and 449–93. doi:10.3406/rhef.1920.2144.
- McKitterick, Rosamond (1989). The Carolingians and the Written Word. Cambridge: Cambridge University Press.
- Poquet, Alexandre Eusèbe (1855). Notre-Dame de Soissons: son histoire, ses églises, ses tombeaux, ses abbesses, ses reliques. Didron.
- Zola, Alan G. (2008). Radbertus's Monastic Voice: Ideas about Monasticism at Ninth-century Corbie (Ph.D. dissertation). Loyola University Chicago.
