= Notitia de servitio monasteriorum =

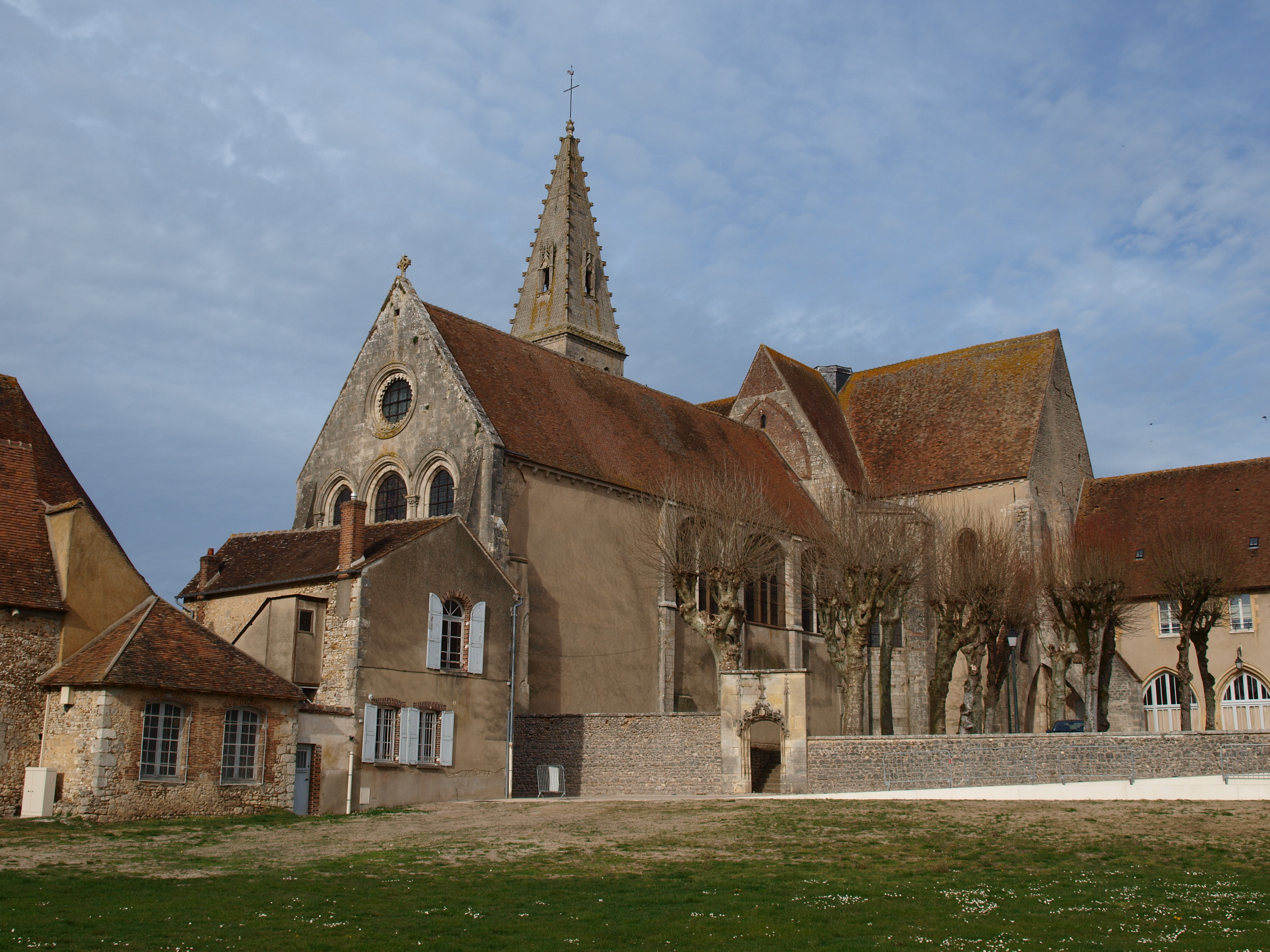
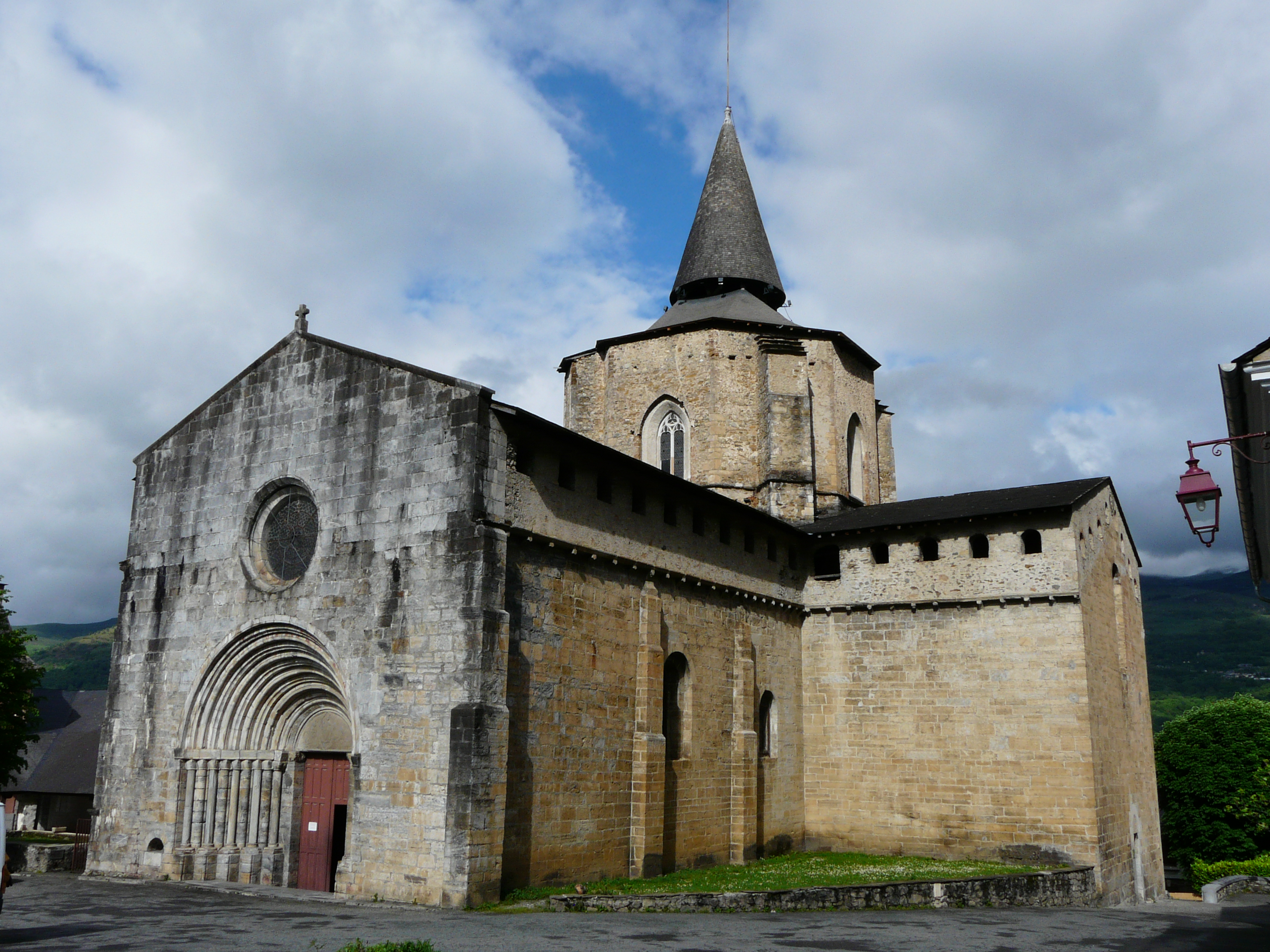
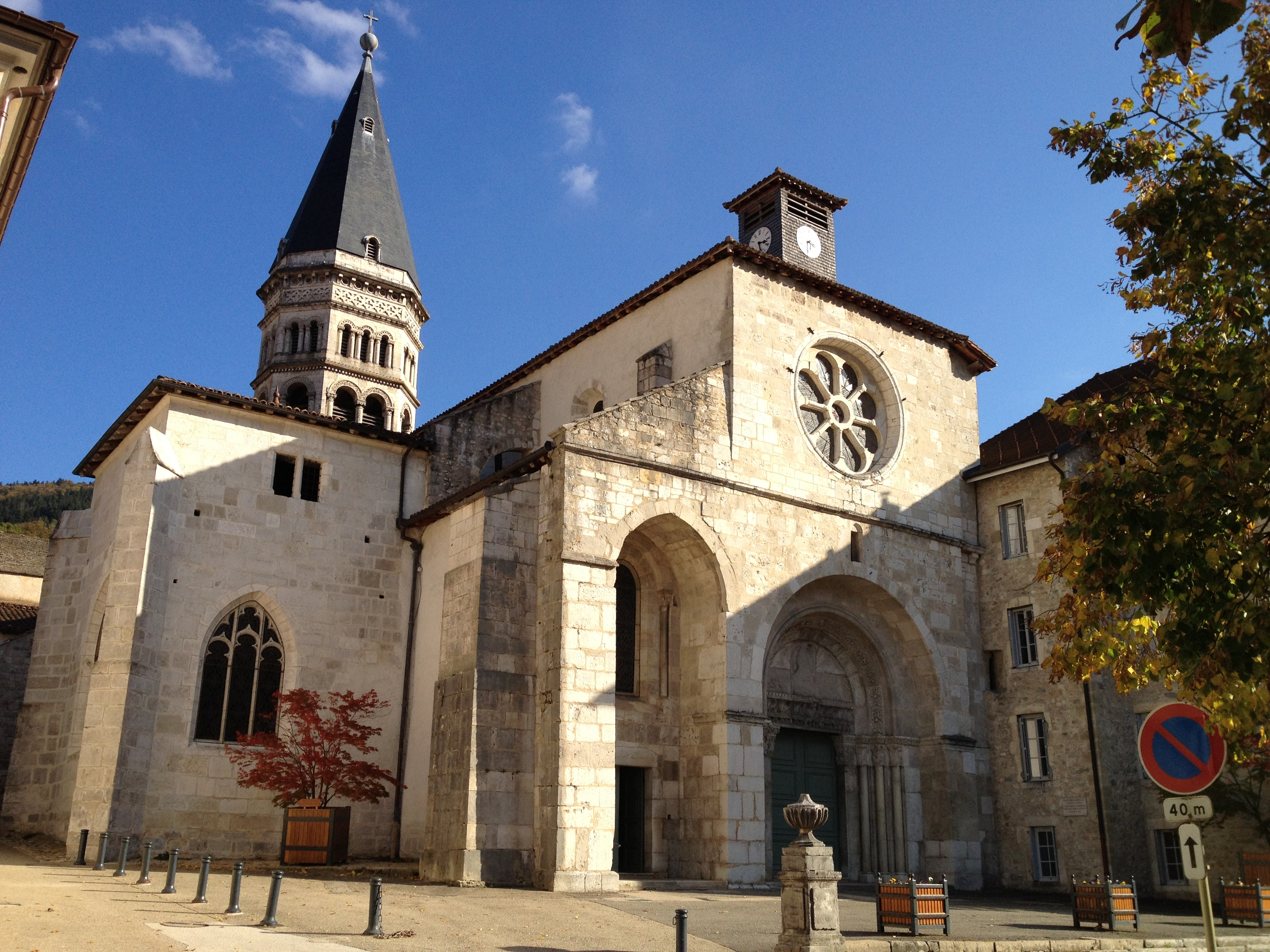
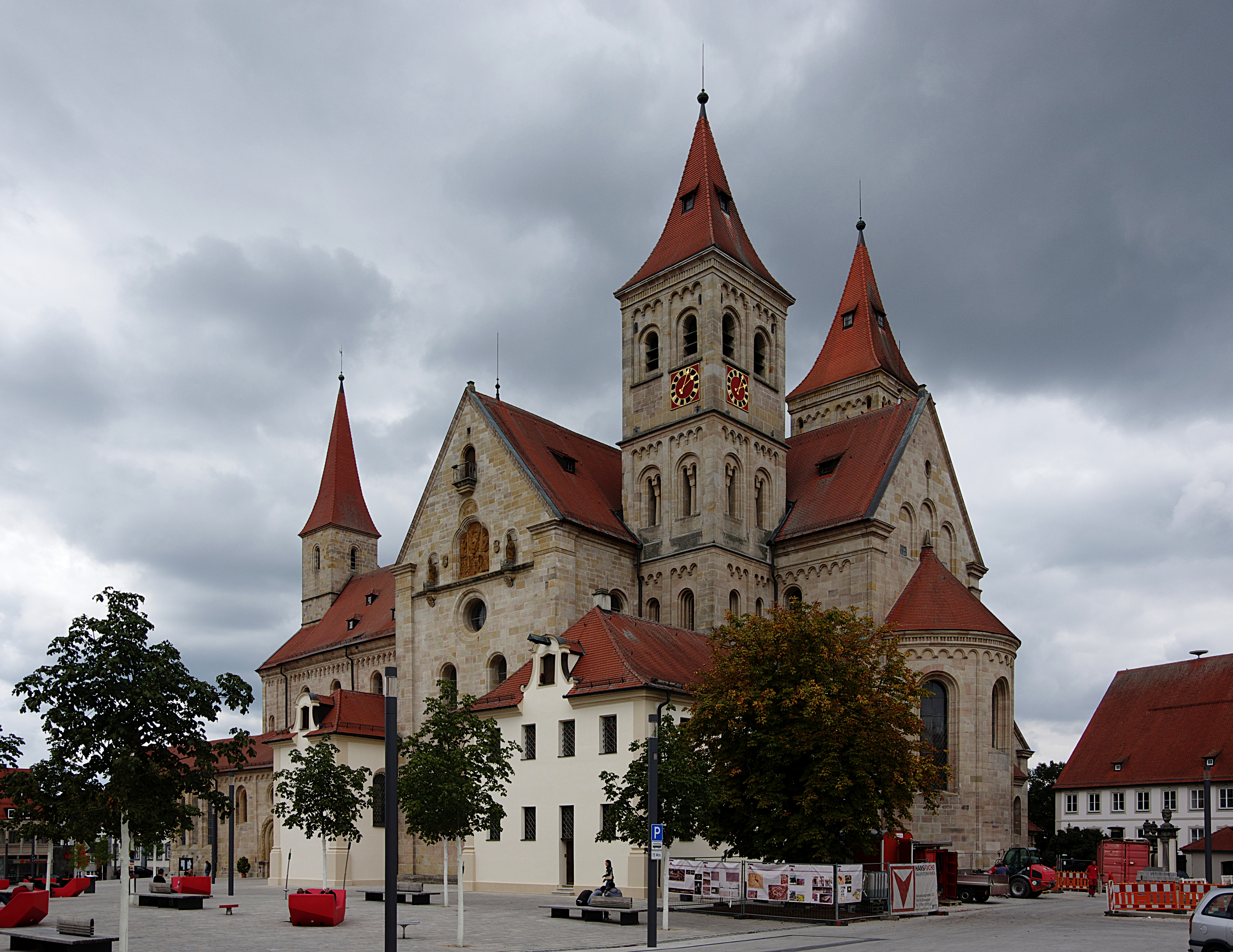
Four monasteries in the Notitia. Clockwise from upper left: Ferrières (which owed tribute, military service and prayers), Saint-Savin (prayers), Ellwangen (tribute and prayers), Saint-Michel de Nantua (tribute and prayers).

The Notitia de servitio monasteriorum ("Notice of the Service of Monasteries") is a list of monasteries in the Frankish Empire and the services they owed the crown. It was compiled under Emperor Louis the Pious in 819, probably as a summation of the royal reform of the monasteries carried out following the councils of 816 and 817. It is not a complete list of the reformed monasteries: only 82 of the 104 monasteries known to have adopted the reforms are listed in the Notitia.

There three basic services monasteries could owe to the sovereign. Militia was military service. Dona was an annual gift, tax or service "donated" to the king. Orationes was the obligation to pray for the royal family and the state of the realm. Collectively, these were known by the technical term servitium regis ("king's service"), hence the servitio of the Notitia's title. The service of prayer, although specified in the Notitia, appears to have been considered a general obligation of all ecclesiastical institutions in the empire. The burden of these services seem to have been more severe in west Francia than in east Francia. Only four monasteries east of the Rhine owed all three services: Lorsch, Schuttern, Mondsee and Tegernsee.

The monastic reforms undertaken in the years preceding the Notitia's compilation were led by the monk Benedict of Aniane. One of his chief concerns was to secure an income for the exclusive use of the monks. This was because at the time monasteries frequently granted revenue-generating lands as benefices to laymen in return for the laymen's service, a process known as enfeoffment. Since monasteries could be governed by a secular abbot, that is, by an abbot who was not under the rule (regula) of the monastery, property and thus revenue could be alienated without regard for the needs of the monks. To prevent this, Benedict frequently designated some land as belonging exclusively to the prebend (endowment) of the monks. According to the Vita sancti Benedicti Anianensis, a biography of Benedict written by his disciple Ardo, the emperor Louis determined which monasteries in the realm were required to have a regular abbot, in order to prevent the abuse of monks by laymen. Although this list was probably a companion of the Notitia, it has not come down to us.

== Manuscripts ==
In 1629, Jacques Sirmond published the Notitia based on a codex he found in the abbey of Saint-Gilles, but he did not edit it. This had to await André Duchesne in 1636, who was apparently unaware of Sirmond's earlier publication. This manuscript is now lost and since both Sirmond and Duchesne only published the Notitia it is impossible to ascertain whether the codex also contained the chronicle found in a different manuscript from the same abbey. The age of this manuscript is also unknown.

In 1750, Léon Ménard published a text of the Notitia based on a 13th-century manuscript from Saint-Gilles. The manuscript contains a chronicle written by the same hand as the Notitia, and which covers the years 813–18. The brief, perhaps fragmentary, chronicle appears to depend entirely upon the Chronicon Moissiacense for its information, and the author only cared to include information on the major ecclesiastical assemblies of the period. A related work is the Chronicon Anianense. Both are associated with the monastery of Santa Maria de Ripoll: the Anianense was found there, but is named for Benedict's monastery at Aniane, with which the chronicler showed an acute interest; and the Moissiacense was probably written there, although it was discovered at Saint-Pierre de Moissac. According to Wilhelm Pückert, the chronicle was probably composed by the scribe who wrote the manuscript and also copied in the Notitia.

== List of monasteries ==
=== Dona et militia ===
The first grouping of monasteries is "those which must make a gift and a militia" (haec sunt quae dona et militiam facere debent). The monasteries of East Francia and Bavaria are listed separately:

1. Saint-Benoît de Fleury (Monasterium sancti Benedicti)
2. Ferrière (Monasterium Ferrarias) (Note: Ferrerias)
3. Nesle-la-Reposte (Monasterium Nigelli)
4. La Croix-Saint-Leufroy (Monasterium sanctae Crucis)
5. Corbie (Monasterium Corbeia) (Note: Corbeya)
6. Notre-Dame de Soissons (Monasterium sanctae Mariae Suessionis)
7. Stavelot (Monasterium Stabulaus) (Note: Stablaus)
8. an unidentified monastery called Monasterium Prub... Mediolano, which may be two monasteries (Prüm and Moyenmoutier) or more probably a single house (perhaps one dedicated to Protasius at Milan or perhaps Mettlach)
9. Moutier-Saint-Jean de Réôme (Monasterium sancti Johannis)
10. Faverney (Monasterium Fariniacum) (Note: Flaviniacum, Favriniacum)
11. Saint-Oyend (Monasterium sancti Eugendi)
12. Novalesa (Monasterium Novalicium)

ULTRA RHENUM (beyond the Rhine)

1. Lorsch (Monasterium sancti Nazarii) (Note: Nazari)
2. Schuttern (Monasterium Offunwilarii)

IN BAVARIA

1. Mondsee (Monasterium Manauser) (Note: Mavauster, Mananseo)
2. Tegernsee (Monasterium Tegnauser) (Note: Tegerinseo)

=== Dona sine militia ===
The second grouping of monasteries is "those which must give a donation without a militia" (haec sunt quae tantum dona dare debent sine militia). Once again, the monasteries of East Francia and Bavaria, as well as Alemannia, are listed separately:

1. Saint-Mihiel (Monasterium sancti Michaelis Maresupium) (Note: Marsupii, Maresci primi, Maris periculi)
2. Baume-les-Dames (Monasterium Balma)
3. Saint-Seine (Monasterium sancti Sequani)
4. Nantua (Monasterium Nantuadis) (Note: Natradis, Natuadis)

ULTRA RHENUM (beyond the Rhine)

1. Schwarzach (Monasterium Suarizaha) (Note: Suarisaha)
2. Fulda (Monasterium sancti Bonifacii)
3. Hersfeld (Monasterium sancti Wigberti)

IN ALEMANNIA

1. Ellwangen (Monasterium Clehenwanc) (Note: Elehenwanc)
2. Feuchtwangen (Monasterium Fruelinwanc) (Note: Fruhelinwanc, Fiuhctinwanc)
3. Hasenried (Monasterium Nazaruda) (Note: Nazarecda)
4. Kempten (Monasterium Campita)

IN BAVARIA

1. Weltenburg (Monasterium Altemburc)
2. Altaich (Monasterium Altahe) (Note: Alcabe, Alcane)
3. Kremsmünster (Monasterium Creausa) (Note: Creauza, Crenuza, Cremisa)
4. Mattsee (Monasterium Mathasco) (Note: Mathaseo)
5. Benediktbeuern (Monasterium Buria)

=== Orationes ===
The third grouping of monasteries is "those which neither a gift nor militia must they give, but only prayers for the health of the emperor, as well as his children, and the stability of the empire" (haec sunt quae nec dona, nec militiam dare debent, sed solas orationes pro salute imperatoris vel filiorum ejus et stabilitate imperii). This section of the list is the longest and most comprehensive. It separates out those monasteries of East Francia, Bavaria, Aquitaine, Septimania, Toulouse and Gascony:

1. Moutiers-en-Puisaye (Monasterium Melaredum)
2. Saint-Maur-des-Fossés (Monasterium Fossatus)
3. Lure (Monasterium Ludra) (Note: Lutra, Luda)
4. Munster (Monasterium sancti Gregorii)
5. Marmoutier (Monasterium [sancti] Mauri)
6. Ebersheim (Monasterium Eborreheim)
7. Klingen (Monasterium Clinga)
8. Savigny (Monasterium Saviniaco) (Note: Saviniciaco)
9. Cruas (Monasterium Crudatis) (Note: Erudatis)
10. Donzère (Monasterium Dusera)
11. possibly Lérins (Monasterium Lorwim)

ULTRA RHENUM (beyond the Rhine)

1. Stettwang (Monasterium Scewanc) (Note: Schewanc)
2. Schlüchtern (Monasterium Sculturbura) (Note: Scultzurburna)

IN BAVARIA

1. Haindlingberg (Monasterium Berch)
2. Metten (Monasterium Methema) (Note: Mechema)
3. Schönau (Monasterium Scovenawa) (Note: Sconenauva, Scovenauva)
4. Moosburg (Monasterium Aloseburch) (Note: Alozeburch, Moseburch)
5. Wessobrunn (Monasterium Weizzenbrunninco) (Note: Wizzenbrunico)

IN AQUITANIA (in Aquitaine)

1. Noirmoutier-en-l'Île (Monasterium sancti Philiberti) (Note: Filiberti)
2. Saint-Maixent (Monasterium sancti Maxentii)
3. Charroux (Monasterium Caroffinii) (Note: Karrofini)
4. Brantôme (Monasterium Brantosmurii) (Note: Brantosmum, Brantosmense)
5. Saint-Savin-sur-Gartempe (Monasterium sancti Savini)
6. Sainte-Croix de Poitiers (Monasterium sanctae Crucis puellarum)
7. Notre-Dame de Limoges (Monasterium sanctae Mariae in Lemovicas)
8. Massay (Monasterium Mastracurii)
9. Menat (Monasterium Menadinii) (Note: Menadivii)
10. Manglieu (Monasterium Magnilocum)
11. Conques (Monasterium Conquas)
12. Saint-Antonin-Noble-Val (Monasterium sancti Antonii) (Note: Anthonii)
13. Moissac (Monasterium Musciacum)

IN SEPTIMANIA

1. Saint-Gilles (Monasterium sancti Aegidii in valle Flaviana)
2. Psalmodi (Monasterium Psalmodium)
3. Aniane (Monasterium Anianum)
4. Saint-Thibéry (Monasterium sancti Tiberii)
5. Villemagne-l'Argentière (Monasterium Villa magna)
6. Joncels (Monasterium sancti Petri in Lunate)
7. Caunes (Monasterium Caunas)
8. Montolieu (Monasterium Castelli Malasci) (Note: Castrelli Malasci)
9. Cabrières (Monasterium sanctae Mariae Capariensis) (Note: Caprariensis)
10. La Grasse (Monasterium sanctae Mariae ad Orubionem)
11. Saint-Chignan (Monasterium sancti Laurentii)
12. Sainte-Eugénie (Monasterium sanctae Eugeniae...)
13. Saint-Hilaire (Monasterium sancti Hilarii)
14. Arles-du-Vallespir (Monasterium Valle asperii)

IN TOLOSANO (in the Toulousain)

1. Saint-Papoul (Monasterium sancti Papuli)
2. Sorèze (Monasterium Suricinium) (Note: Surizinum, Soricinum)
3. Le Mas-d'Azil (Monasterium Asilo) (Note: Mansi Asilii, Mansi Asilis)
4. Venerque (Monasterium Venercha)

IN WASCONIA (in Gascony)

1. Serres (Monasterium Cella-fraxilii)
2. Notre-Dame de Simorre (Monasterium Cimorra)
3. Saint-Michel de Pessan (Monasterium Piciano) (Note: Pisciano, Visciano)
4. Saint-Sixte de Fagito (Monasterium Altum fagitum) (Note: fragitum)
5. Saint-Savin (Monasterium sancti Savini)

Notes on names

The names below are variations found in the manuscripts.

== Sources ==
- Bernhardt, John W. "Servitium regis and Monastic Property in Early Medieval Germany". Viator 18 (1987): 53–87.
- Bernhardt, John W. Itinerant Kingship and Royal Monasteries in Early Medieval Germany, c. 936–1075. Cambridge Studies in Medieval Life and Thought, 21. Cambridge: Cambridge University Press, 1993. ISBN 0521394899
- Lesne, Émile. "Les ordonnances monastiques de Louis le Pieux et la Notitia de servitio monasteriorum" Revue d'histoire de l'église de France 6 (1920): 161–75, 321–38 and 449–93.
- Niedermayer, Andreas. Das Mönchtum in Bajuwarien in den römischen, agilolfingischen und karolingischen Zeiten Landshut: J. Thomann, 1859.
- Reuter, Timothy. Germany in the Early Middle Ages, c. 800–1056. London: Longman, 1991. ISBN 0582490340
- Schneider, Olaf. Erzbischof Hinkmar und die Folgen: Der vierhundertjährige Weg historischer Erinnerungsbilder von Reims nach Trier. De Gruyter, 2010.
- Zola, Alan G. Radbertus's Monastic Voice: Ideas about Monasticism at Ninth-century Corbie. Ph.D. dissertation. Loyola University Chicago, 2008.
