= Abbey of Aniane =

Benedictine monastery in southern France from 782 to 1790

Coordinates: 43.6836°N 3.5893°E

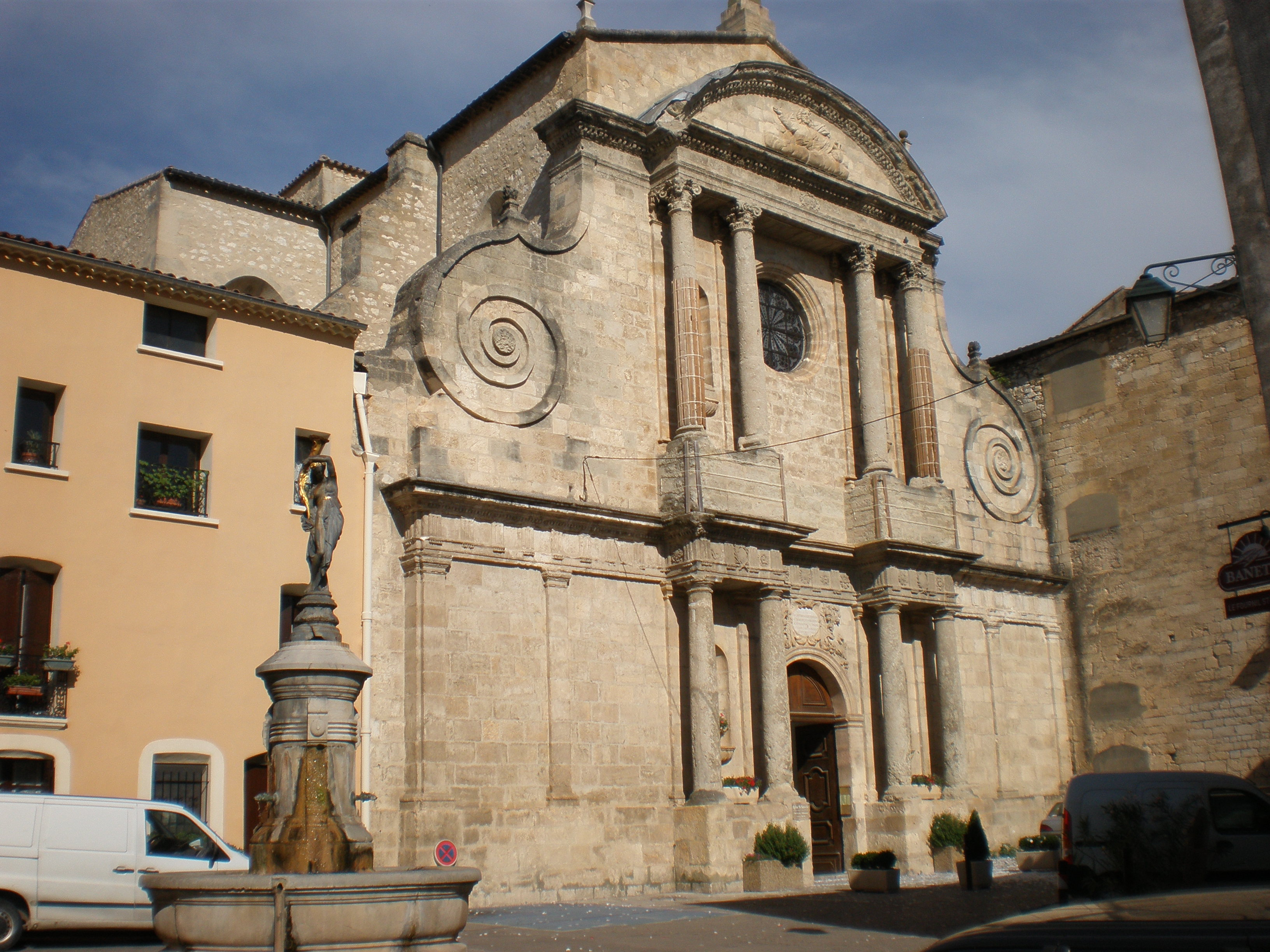
Façade of the old abbey church today

The abbey of Aniane was a Benedictine monastery in southern France between 782 and 1790. Founded by Benedict of Aniane with the support of Charlemagne, it was a major reforming monastery in the Carolingian era. It went into decline in the 16th century, when it was placed under custodianship (1542) and sacked by Calvinists (1562). After 1633, it was a Maurist house. It was closed during the French Revolution.

== History ==
=== Foundation ===
Aniane was founded in 782 in the diocese of Maguelone as a Benedictine monastery. Its founder was Witiza, son of the count of Maguelone and a friend of Charlemagne. He took the religious name Benedict.

The abbey was located on the banks of the brook Anian, now called Corbières, just upstream from where it joins the Hérault. It took its name from the brook. Its original dedicated was to Our Lady (Notre-Dame) and the Holy Saviour (Saint-Sauveur). In its early years it also had altars dedicated to Saint Michael and Saints Peter and Paul.

=== Carolingian era ===
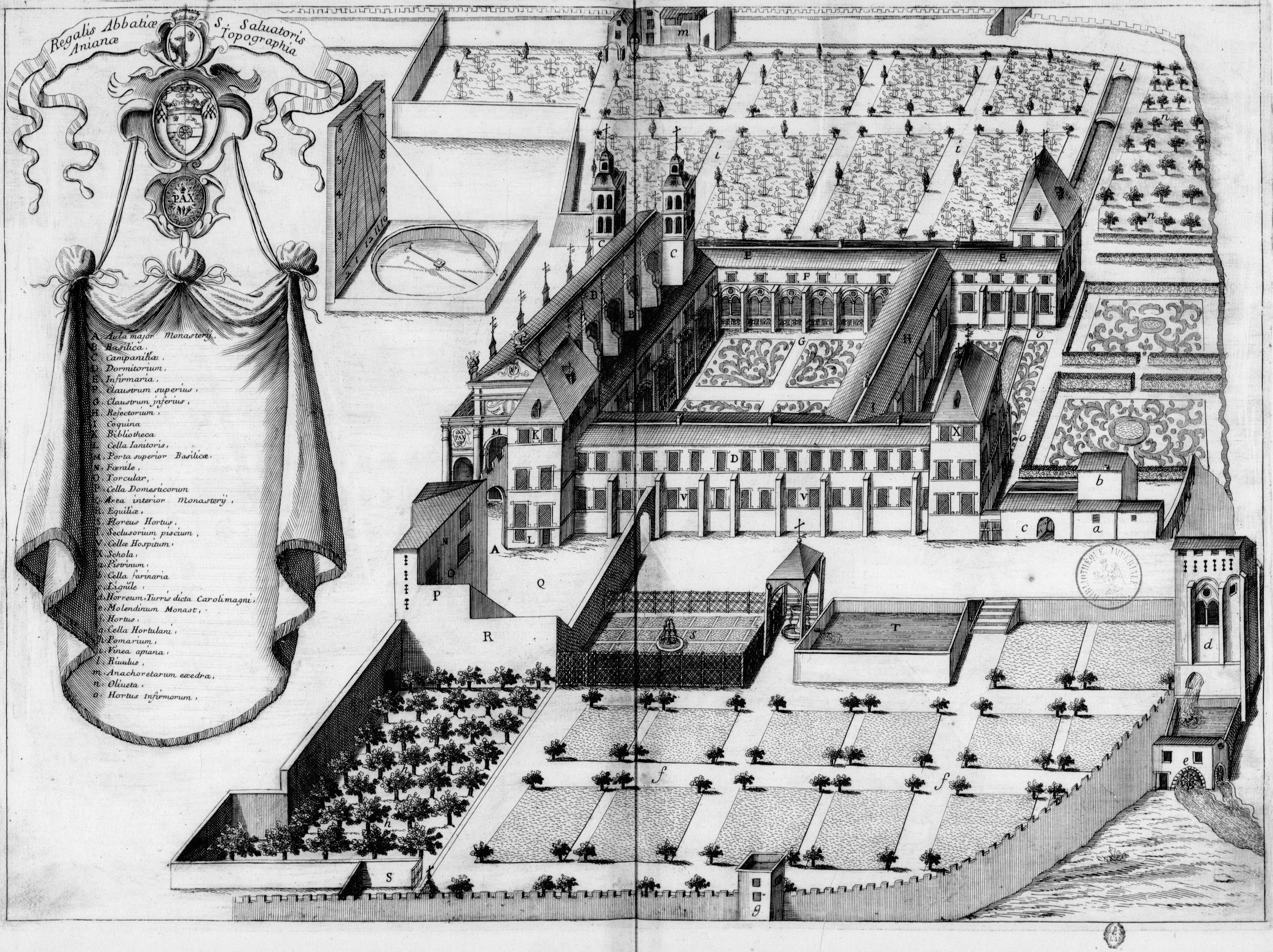
Aniane in the Monasticon Gallicanum

Aniane was endowed by Charlemagne. In 787, he also granted it immunity. By 800, it had 300 monks. Duke William of Toulouse retired from secular life to entre Aniane. In 806, with Benedict's authorization, he and some fellow monks founded the abbey of Gellone.

Aniane was one of the "exemplary cloisters" of the Carolingian monastic reform. At the request of Bishop Theodulf of Orléans, it sent monks to reform Saint-Mesmin de Micy. In 817, the council of Aachen imposed the customs of Aniane on all monasteries in the empire. Its monks spread their renewed emphasis on the Benedictine rule to the houses of Cormery, Île-Barbe, Sainte-Colombe-lès-Sens, Saint-Savin-sur-Gartempe and Celleneuve. According to the Notitia de servitio monasteriorum of 819, the monasterium Anianum owed the emperor prayers only, neither military aid nor aid in kind.

During the Carolingian era, the Chronicon Anianense was written at Aniane. The monk Smaragdus Ardo wrote a biography of Witiza. So prominent was the abbey that, in 822, Archbishop Agobard of Lyon and Nimfridius of Narbonne attended the abbatial election.

=== High Middle Ages ===
In 890, the abbey and its rich holdings were occupied by Archbishop Rostang of Arles. He managed to pass control of it down to his successor, Manasses Afterwards it was acquired by the bishop of Béziers. By the 11th century, it had regained its independence.

In the 11th century, Aniane was involved in a serious dispute with its daughter house of Gellone. Abbot Emneno, himself a former monk of Gellone, claimed authority over it. The monks of Aniane produced false documents to support their claims. These did not fool the pope, who confirmed the independence of Gellone. Aniane was also involved in a dispute with the abbey of La Chaise-Dieu over the priory of Gourdaignes. The parties reached a compromise settlement under Pope Adrian IV.

In the 14th century, the abbots of Aniane were prominent at the papal curia when the papacy was in Avignon. The abbey was highly favoured and several abbots became bishops of Béziers, Montpellier, Nîmes and Saint-Papoul. After the start of the Great Schism in 1378, the abbots continued to support the popes at Avignon. Benedict XIII rewarded Abbot Philippe by appointing him vicar general in the archdiocese of Arles. The result was that the abbey suffered a punitive visitation and reform in 1411 from the Roman pope Gregory XII.

=== Reformation to Revolution ===
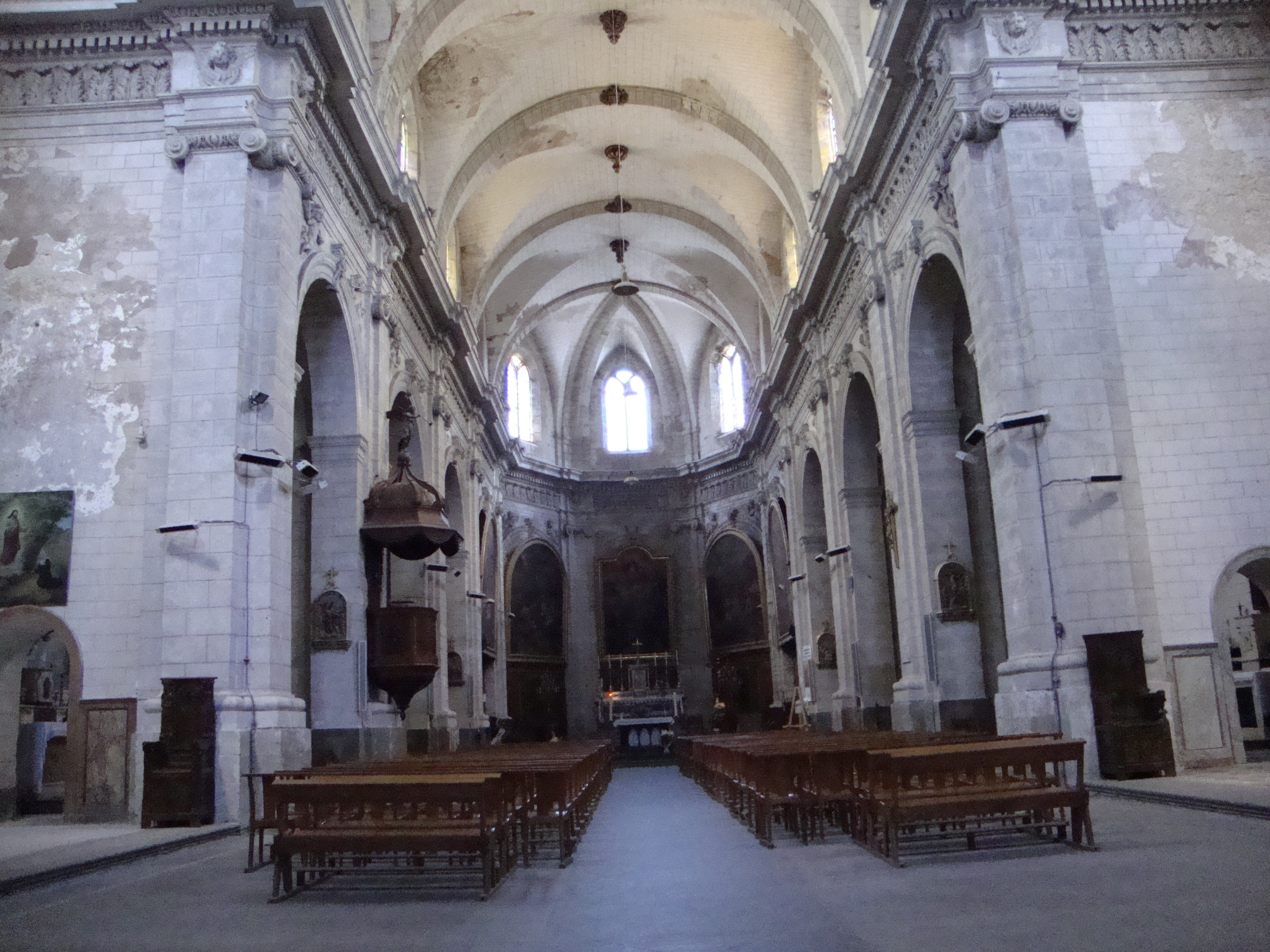
Interior of the church

In the 16th century, Aniane went into decline. It was placed in commendam in 1542. At the start of the French Wars of Religion, the Calvinists gained the ascendancy in the region. On 29 December 1561, they forced the abandonment of Catholic services in the church. On 15 April 1562, they sacked the abbey, razing the buildings and burning the archives and furnishings. The commendatory abbot himself, Jean de Saint-Chamond, soon abandoned Catholicism and converted.

The abbey's property was acquired by the Bonzi family that controlled the diocese of Béziers between 1616 and 1703. The Bonzis charity and religious zeal assured that the irregularity of the acquisition was ignored. Clément de Bonzi initiated a Maurist reform in 1633. Pierre de Bonzi rebuilt the church, laying the first stone on 28 April 1679 and consecrating it on 10 February 1688.

Despite the Bonzis interest in Aniane, the abbey had declined to ten monks in 1768. It was secularized during the French Revolution in 1790. The abbey church became the parish church of the village of Aniane. The other buildings were declared biens nationaux. At first they served as a cotton mill, later a jail.

== List of abbots ==
The following list is from the Dictionnaire d'histoire et de géographie ecclésiastiques.

=== Regular abbots ===
- Benedict (782–814)
  - According to the Chronicon, Benedict was succeeded by Smaragdus Ardo, but a late copy of a diploma of the emperor Louis the Pious shows an abbot Senegild in 815.
- George (819–822)
- Tructesind (elected 822)
- Ermenald (830–838)
  - Elias was abbot before the death of Louis the Pious in 840, but whether he preceded or succeeded Ermenald is not known.
- Arnold (853–875), became bishop of Carcassonne
- Gilmond (890)
- Rostang (890–913), also archbishop of Arles
- Manasses (elected 914), also archbishop of Arles
- Bernard Gerald (960–962), also bishop of Béziers
- Leufred (971)
- Reginald (972–986)
- Hugh (dates uncertain)
- Salvator (1025)
- Pons I (1036–1059)
- Emneno (1066–1089), died in office
- Pierre de Sauve (1094–1114)
- Pons II (1115–1119)
- Pierre Raymond de Calz (1120–1140)
- Guillaume (1146–1154)
- Pierre (1155–1158)
- Gaucelin Raymond de Montpeyroux (1161), became bishop of Lodève
- Raymond Guillaume (1162–1187), became bishop of Lodève
- Adhemar (1187–1195)
- Gaucelin (1201–1204)
- Amien (existence uncertain)
- Bernard de Vertefeuil (1205–1218), died in office
- Guillaume de Brignac (1221–1230)
- Guillaume de Valhauquès (1232–1235)
- Guillaume de Parme (1236–1247)
- Pierre de Sauve (1250–1280)
- Raymond Delmas (1281)
  - Raymond de Sérignac and Jean de Sauve were jointly elected abbot in 1282.
- Pons de Canillac I (1285–1311)
- Gui de Canillac (1312–1333)
- Guillaume de Landorre (1335–1349), became bishop of Béziers
- Pons de Canillac II (1349–1360)
- Jean de Gase (1365–1367), became bishop of Nîmes
- Bernard de Castelnau (1367–1369), became bishop of Saint-Papoul
- Pierre de Vernols (1369–1373), became bishop of Montpellier
- Pierre de La Plotte (1373–1377)
- Hugues de Pujols (1378–1397)
  - Jean de Bordet, vicar
- Philippe (1399–1412)
- Guillaume (1413–1422)
- Pierre de Roquessels (1423–1443)
  - In 1443, Bertrand de Brisson was canonically elected. King Charles VII appointed a commendatory abbot, Jean d'Armand, in response. In 1444, Bertrand resigned. Jean continued in power until 1452.
- Girard de Roux (1452–1490)
- Jacques de Roux (1490–1494)
- Antoine de Narbonne I (1494–1516)
- Antoine de Narbonne II (1516–1542), also bishop of Sisteron and Mâcon

=== Commendatory abbots ===
- Jean du Bellay (1542–1546), also cardinal
- Rostaing de la Baume de Suze (1546–1556), also bishop of Orange
- Jean de Saint-Chamond (1557–1567), also archbishop of Aix
- Jean Bourgois (1568–1571)
- Laurent de Fizes (1582–1595), also abbot of Saint-Laumer de Blois
- Louis du Caylar d'Espandeillan (1595–1600)
  - A layman, Louis was represented in spiritual matters by the priest Pierre Host.
- Taneguy Le Blanc du Rollet (1603–1614)
- Pierre Le Blanc du Rollet (1614–1615)
- Jean de Bonzi (1616–1621), also cardinal and bishop of Béziers
- Clément de Bonzi (1621–1659), also bishop of Béziers
- Pierre de Bonzi (1660–1703), also cardinal
- Francois Blouin (1703–1723)
- Louis de La Tour du Pin de Montauban (1723–1737), also bishop of Toulon
- Antoine-Joseph de Chevrières (1738–1752)
- Gabriel François Moreau (1752–1782), also bishop of Vence and Mâcon
- Jean-Baptiste de Joussineau de Tourdonnet (1782–1790), also vicar general of the diocese of Meaux
