= Celleneuve =

Coordinates: 43.613296°N 3.828585°E

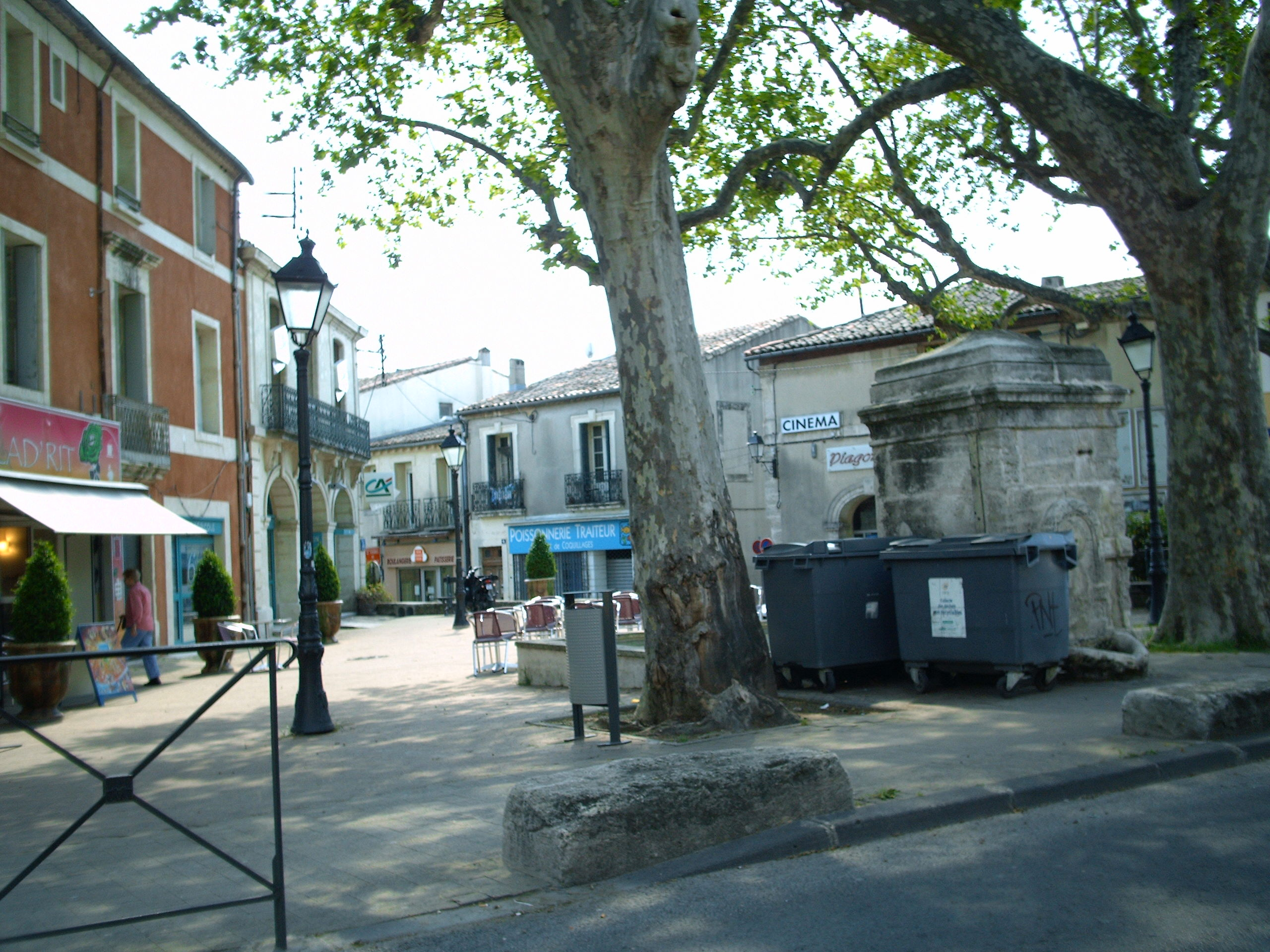
Place Renaudel (Renaudel Square) with its fountain and Cinéma Nestor Burma movie theater

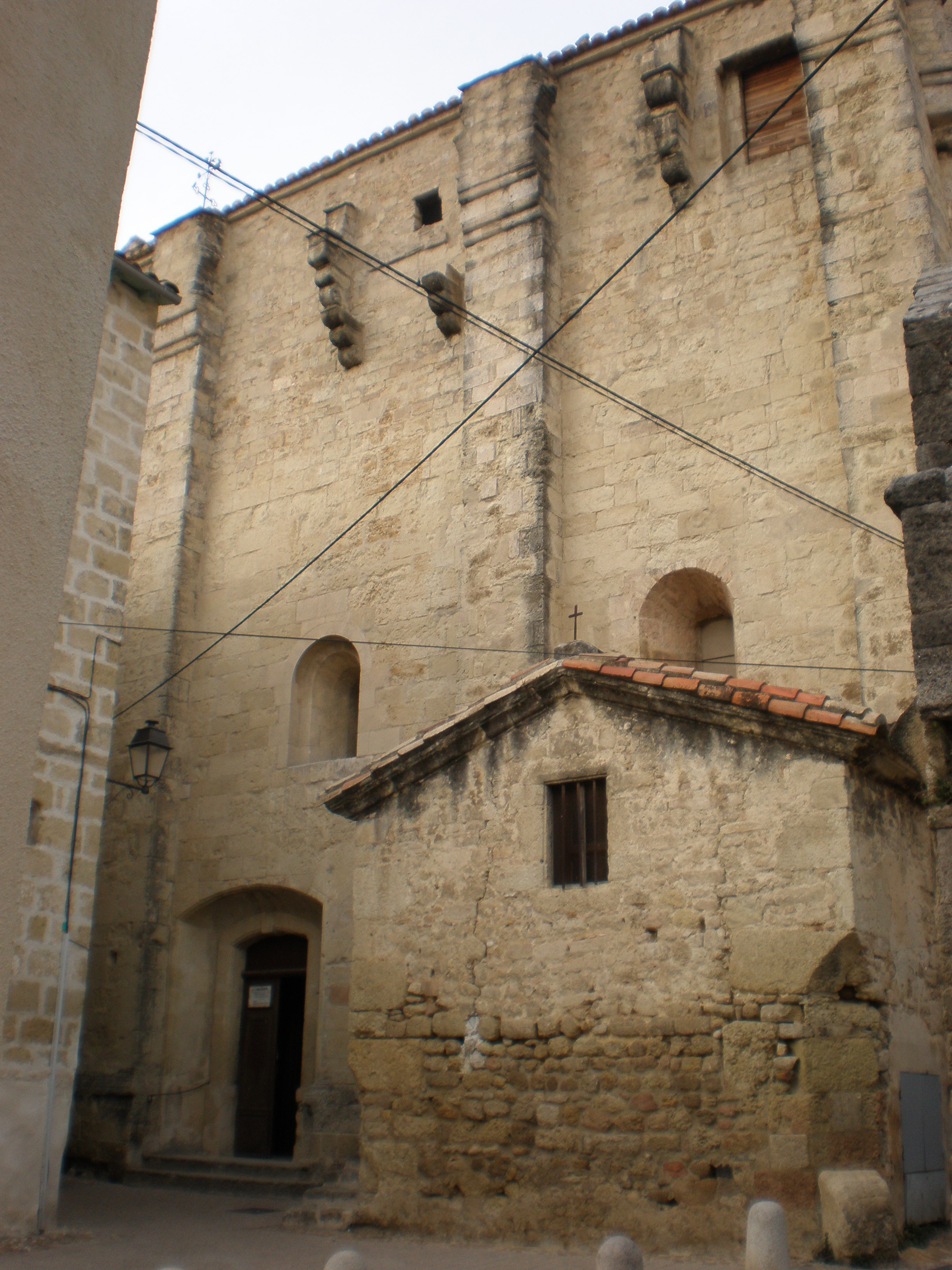
Eglise Sainte-Croix de Celleneuve (Holy Cross Church), one of the oldest churches in Montpellier (XIIth c)

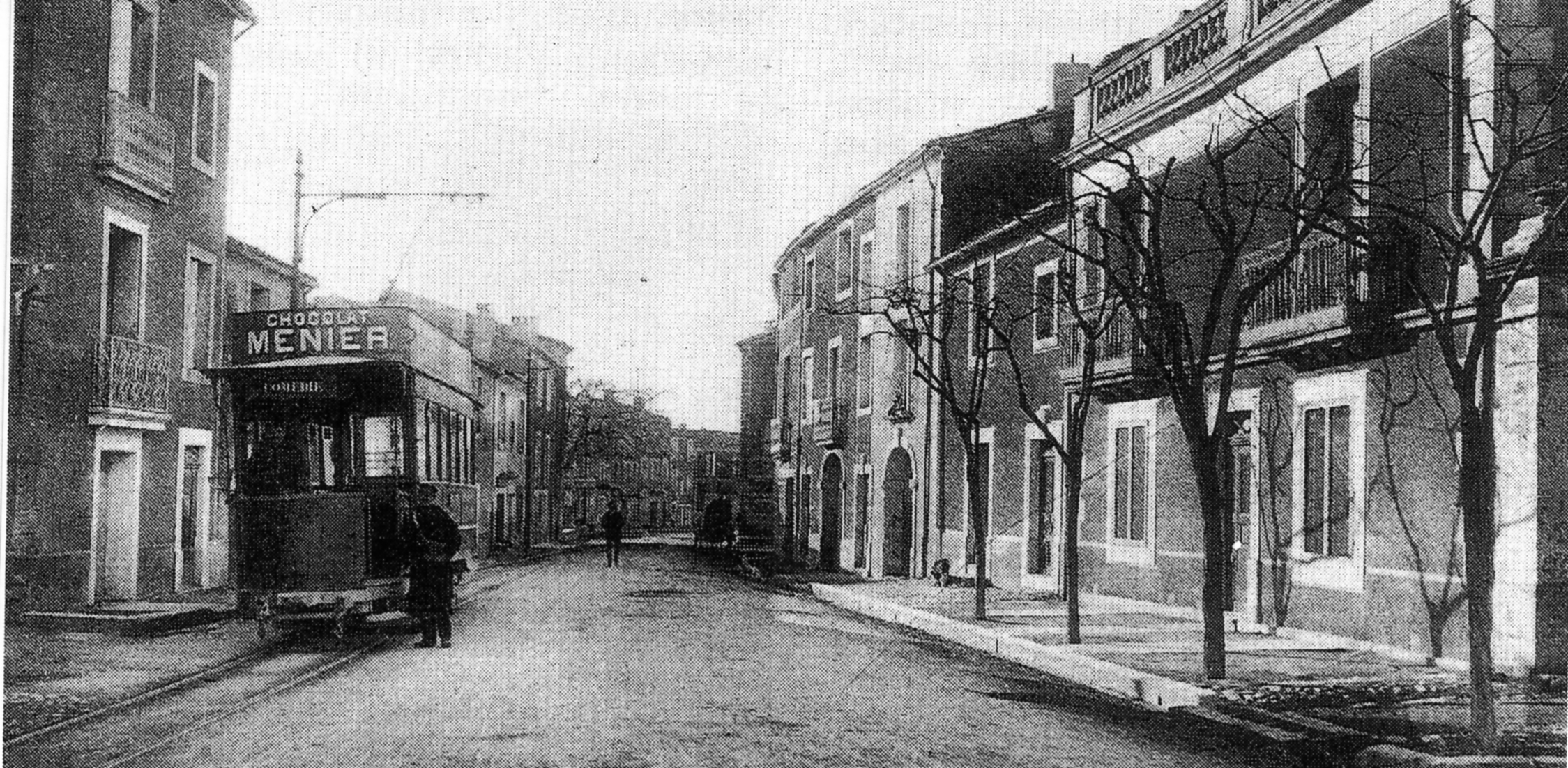
Postcard showing Celleneuve tram terminus on Avenue de Lodève in the 1910s, with a Brill traction

Celleneuve (Cèlanòva in Occitan) is a part of Mosson neighbourhood, in the West of the city of Montpellier, Hérault, France.

The place name can be translated as new cellar. It first appeared in Aniane's cartulary, written in 799, where it is mentioned that Benedict of Aniane (c. 747-821) created a priory, called Cella nova on the soil of Juvignac, even before the city of Montpellier was founded (first mentioned in a document of 985).

Equipments

- Maison pour tous Marie Curie
- Caisse d'allocations familiales
- Parc Dioscorides
- Esplanade Léo Malet

People from Celleneuve:

- Abbé Fabre (1727–1783), a prior of Celleneuve, writer of Occitan literature, whose Sermoun de moussu sistre, delivered by a drunken priest against intemperance, is a masterpiece.
- Léo Malet (1909-1996), a crime novelist and the creator of fiction character Nestor Burma.
