= Ardo Smaragdus =

French hagiographer (died 843)

Saint Ardo Smaragdus
- Died: March 843; Aniane, Hérault, France
- Feast: 7 March

Ardo Smaragdus (died March 843 AD) was a hagiographer. He entered the monastery of Aniane in Hérault as a boy, probably as an oblate, and was brought up by Benedict of Aniane. He was ordained a priest and made head of the monastery school.

In 794, he accompanied Benedict to the Council of Frankfurt. and in 814, he replaced Benedict as abbot after the latter joined the imperial court at Aix-la-Chapelle.

Smaragdus wrote a life of Benedict in 822, one of the most reliable hagiological productions of that period. He himself was honored as a saint at his monastery after his death.

== Editions ==
- Ardo Smaragdus, Vita, Migne's Patrologia Latina, 103:353 sqq.;
- Cabaniss, Allen, trans. Benedict of Aniane: The Emperor's Monk, Ardo's Life. Foreword by Annette Grabowsky and Clemens Radl. Kalamazoo, Michigan: Cistercian Publications, 2008. Pp. 112.
