= Pont du Diable =

Pont du Diable may refer to:

- Pont du Diable, Hérault, a bridge over a steep-sided gorge in the Hérault département of France constructed in the 11th century
- Pont du Diable (Villemagne-l'Argentière), a bridge over the river Mare in the Hérault département of France constructed in the 18th century
- Pont du Diable (Céret), a medieval stone arch bridge at Céret, France

== See also ==
- Devil's Bridge
- fr:Pont du Diable, a more extensive list in French Wikipedia
