= Villemagne-l'Argentière =

- Commune
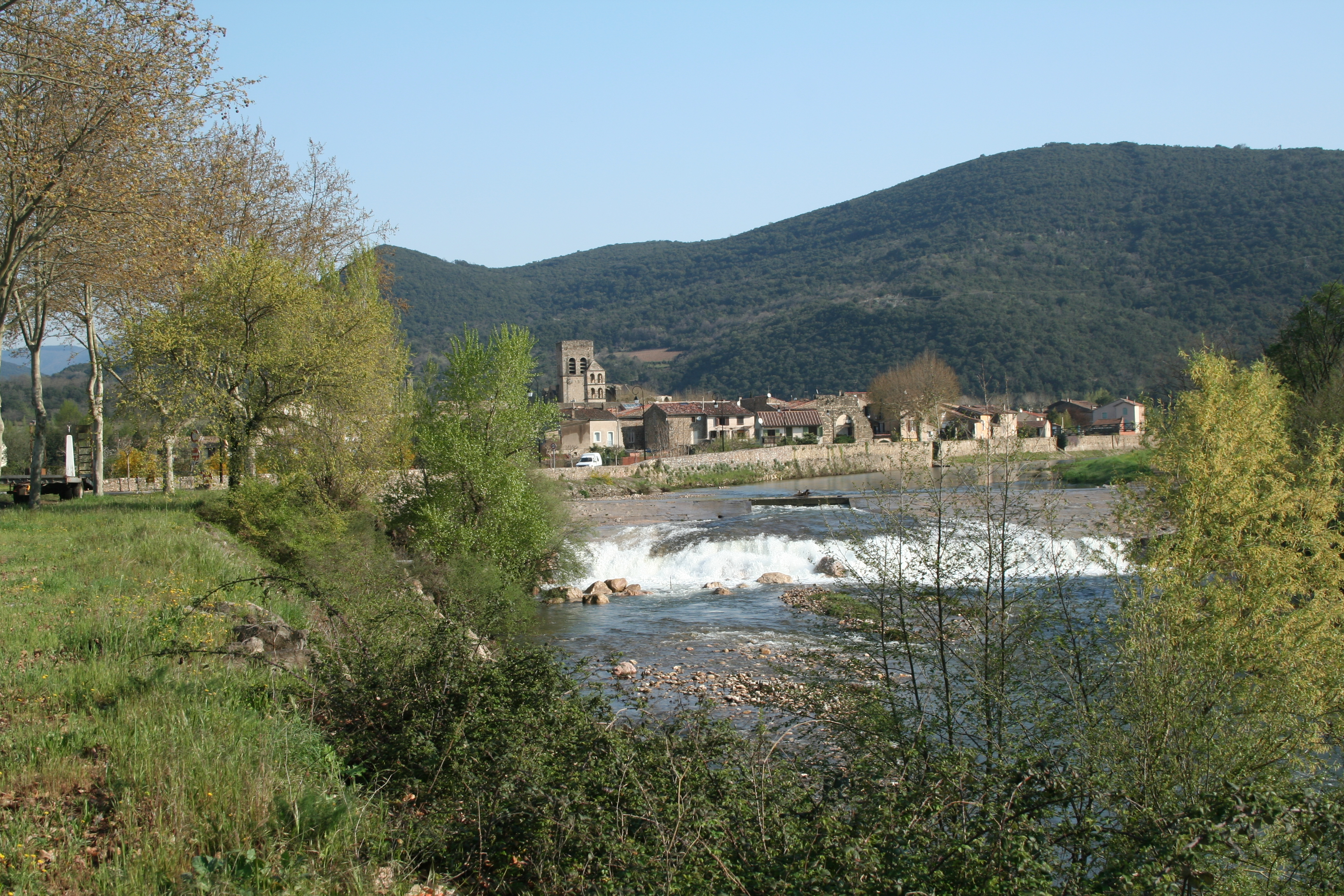
- General view from across the Mare River

- Coat of arms
- Location of Villemagne-l'Argentière
- Location within France Location within Occitanie
- Coordinates: 43°37′07″N 3°07′13″E
- Country: France
- Region: Occitania
- Department: Hérault
- Arrondissement: Béziers
- Canton: Clermont-l'Hérault

Government
  - Mayor (2024–2026): Julian Guiraud
- Area^{1}: 8.06 km^{2} (3.11 sq mi)
- Elevation: 200 m (660 ft)
- Highest elevation: 481 m (1,578 ft)
- Lowest elevation: 187 m (614 ft)
- Population (2023): 415
  - Density: 51.5/km^{2} (133/sq mi)
- Time zone: UTC+01:00 (CET)
  - Summer (DST): UTC+02:00 (CEST)
- INSEE/Postal code: 34335 /34600
- ^{1} French Land Register data, which excludes lakes, ponds, glaciers > 1 km^{2} (0.386 sq mi or 247 acres) and river estuaries.

Villemagne-l'Argentière (French pronunciation: [vilmaɲ laʁʒɑ̃tjɛʁ]; Occitan: Vilamanha, before 1989: Villemagne) is a commune near Bédarieux in the Hérault department in the Occitanie region in southern France.

== History ==
At the end of the 7th century, the first monastery was founded by Clarinus Lubila, a monk of the order of Saint Benedict from Monte Cassino. This monastery was situated at the northwestern edge of the village and consisted initially of a chapel, a novicial, a refectory and kitchen, an infirmary and a hospice for the poor and for travellers.

A century later, this monastery was destroyed by the Saracens then restored to life by Charlemagne. In the 9th century, the name of Villemagna (big domain) appears for the first time, in the Synods of Aachen (816–819) among nineteen monasteries in Septimania which were required to furnish the Emperor neither with presents nor soldiers, but only prayers.

The monastery had probably taken the name of an ancient Gallo-Roman domain situated nearby and called villa magna - the big villa – a very common name for an important agricultural estate. In 893, the abbey, which was then named after St. Martin, patron saint of the ancient parish, took the name of St Majan, confessor of Antioch, whose relics had recently been stolen from Lombez, in Gascony, by Sulsani and Centulle, two monks from Villemagne.

From then on, the pilgrims flooded into Villemagne, being situated not far from the road from Arles to Santiago de Compostela, there to worship St Majan's relics, reputed for their intercessions in favour of the blind and the lame, in particular.

In the 10th century the abbey came under the protection of the Lords of Narbonne and Béziers who granted the abbey numerous privileges as well as lands and a large quantity of silver.

In the 12th century, Villemagne was under the control of the two most powerful noblemen in the region:

- Roger Trencavel, viscount of Carcassonne and Béziers;
- Ermengarde of Narbonne.

At this time, the abbey was put under the direct protection of the King of France, to protect it from the whims of these noblemen who wanted to resume the donations granted by their forefathers on the clergy during the terrors of the year 1000.

In 1156, Louis VII of France authorized the Abbot of Villemagne to fortify the abbey and to surround the town with ditches protected by high towers. This authorisation was renewed in 1212 by Philippe Auguste, which allows us to date the current vestiges of ramparts and town gates. King Louis VII gave the monastery legal authority in civil, criminal and capital affairs, and confirmed the rights over the local silver mines, both existing or newly discovered, that the monastery shared with the viscount of Béziers and the viscountess of Narbonne. The mines were situated in the municipality of Pradal, which was then a dependency of Villemagne. These mines contributed greatly to the fortune and to the reputation of Villemagne and thus the suffix: Argentière was added to the name of the town.

In 1510 the monastery and the church of St Majan were reconstructed. At this time, there were a dozen monks in residence, in a still prosperous monastery, with several dependent churches, Saint Raphaël, la Bastide, Soumatre and St. Pierre-de Brousson. The abbot retained a doctor, an apothecary and a surgeon, and welcomed vagrants.

Villemagne maintained its prestige and its size until 1560, when the Protestants under Claude de Narbonne Caylus, Baron de Faugères, seized the abbey, plundering and burning the archives.

After numerous raids by one or another religious party, the surviving monks took refuge at Saint-Maur-des-Fossés, near Paris. They returned to the abbey of Villemagne in 1661 bringing with them their congregation from St. Maur. They restored the monastery and its abbey church, the current parish church of St. Majan. They requested permission to acquire the necessary lands for a garden for the monastery, which was granted a year later.

Then the monks diverted the water from the del couven spring to a reservoir (now filled) which was in the middle of the monastery garden. This garden is situated to the west of the abbey, and is the site for a proposed historical garden to be developed by the village.

At the beginning of the 18th century, the leaders of Villemagne asked the States of Languedoc and the king for financial assistance following numerous natural disasters: frozen olive trees in 1714, floods in 1741 and 1742 and especially in 1745.

In the latter year, the river Mare, which had until then been to the west of Villemagne, then changed its course cutting the town in two; the part of the town to the left (East) of the new course was severely damaged and was abandoned including its ancient church of St. Sauveur. The part of the town on the new right bank, which corresponds to the current historic centre of Villemagne, was covered with 1.80 m of water; when the water receded the town was partially buried under a deep layer of silt. Numerous further floods resulted in the village being raised by up to 3 metres in some places.

The remaining five monks left Villemagne in 1793. After the French Revolution the churches were devastated and plundered and the surviving papers, charters etc. were destroyed by fire in the town square which explains the complete lack of historical archives. The ecclesiastical buildings were sold off by auction, including the abbey and its dependences, which were split between several new proprietors; the abbey church of St Majan, was transformed into a glass factory by the glassworker Giral, (who used coal from Graissessac to feed his furnaces). The then parish church St Grégoire was abandoned and after several years of neglect, its roof collapsed.

The 19th century was again marked by devastating floods of the Mare, notably in 1818, 1840 and 1871, which led to the excavation of the river bed and the raising of the floor level in the church of St Majan, as well as the building of the protective dyke which was extended in 1844 and 1954.

== Sights ==
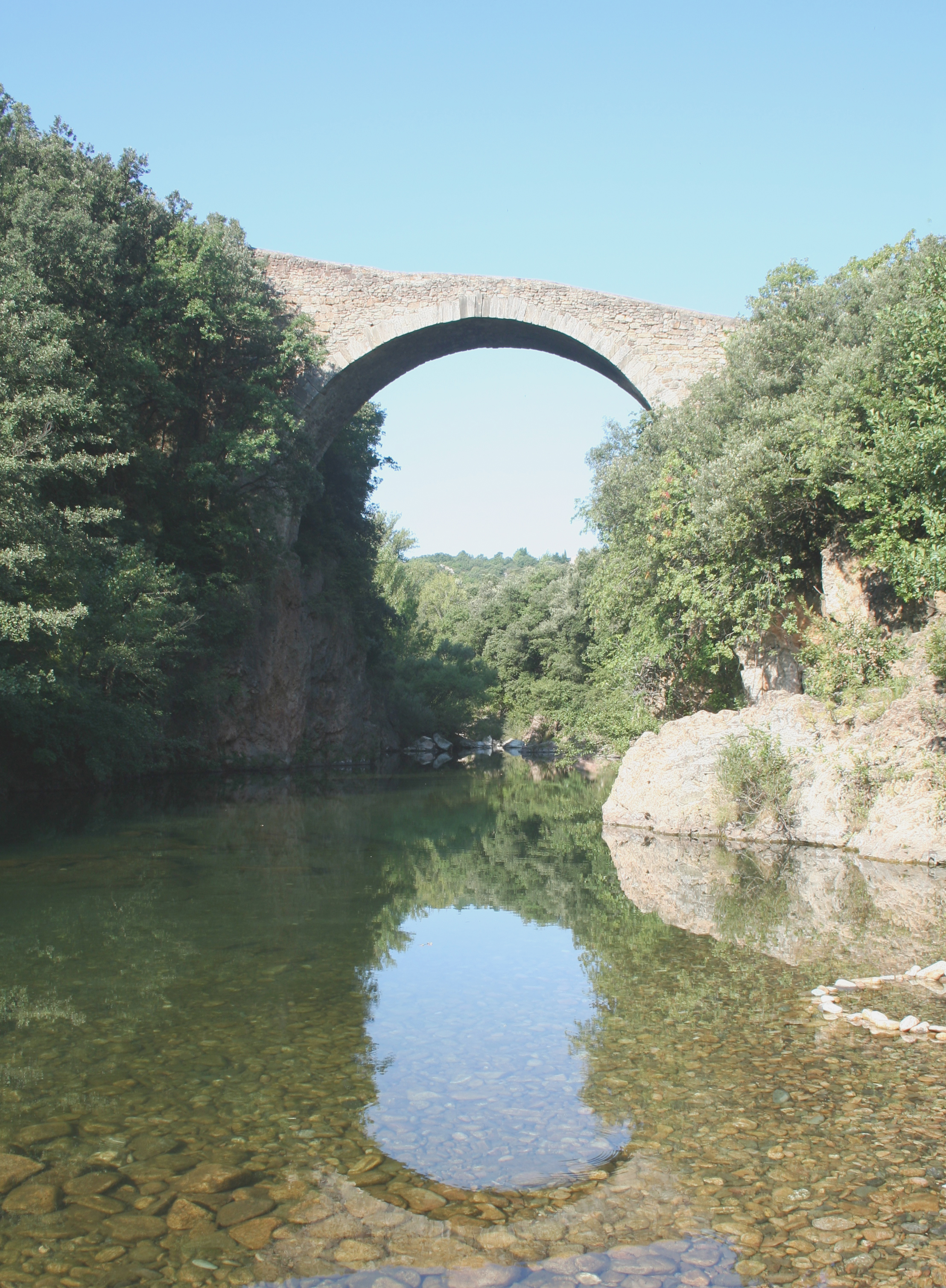
Pont du Diable

=== Churches ===
Until the 13th century there were six churches in and around Villemagne. Today, only the site of St. Martin's and St. Sauveur outside the walls can be located, as well as St. Grégoire and St. Majan inside.

The church of St. Grégoire, built at the end of the 12th century is in the purest Romanesque style, apart from the window above the front door which was reconstructed with an ogival arch in a former Romanesque bay. The former church now houses an archaeological museum.

The church of St. Majan still serves the village today, and was inaugurated and blessed in great pomp in 1664. It is built in the Gothic style, with ogival arches.

=== Others ===
The Hôtel des Monnaies (the Mint) is a national monument and originates from the eleventh century when the currency of the lords of Narbonne, Béziers and Rodez was minted. On the northern face of this building, one can see a very beautiful lintel and Romanesque windows. This building is listed on the 2010 World Monuments Watch List of Most Endangered Sites and is currently undergoing a restoration scheme.

You can also see the ancient ramparts, including the Barbican gate and the Mirande tower (part of the former monastery).

The Pont du Diable (Devil's Bridge) is a 13th-century bridge over the river Mare, about 1 km (1,000 m) to the north of the village. It is 14m long with 2 arches, and descends at an angle of about 15° from the horizontal.

The Hamlet of La Gure

The birthplace of the celebrated Dr Jean-Léon Privat. Famous for his empirical studies in to nervous illnesses and his collaboration with Duchenne de Boulogne. Was one of the founding fathers of the modern spa town of Lamalou les Bains. He was born here, son of a shoemaker 10 November 1810.

== Population ==
Historical population
| Year | Pop. | ±% p.a. |
|---|---|---|
| 1968 | 320 | — |
| 1975 | 291 | −1.35% |
| 1982 | 317 | +1.23% |
| 1990 | 365 | +1.78% |
| 1999 | 429 | +1.81% |
| 2007 | 426 | −0.09% |
| 2012 | 440 | +0.65% |
| 2017 | 433 | −0.32% |
| 2023 | 415 | −0.71% |
Source: INSEE

== See also ==
- Communes of the Hérault department
