= Monastery of Sainte-Eugénie =

Benedictine monastery in France

Coordinates: 43.09044°N 2.90279°E

The monastery of Sainte-Eugénie was a Benedictine foundation near Peyriac-de-Mer between 817 and 1189, when it was absorbed by the Cistercian abbey of Fontfroide. Its buildings and lands became private property devoted to viticulture in the seventeenth century. Although only ever recorded as a priory, what remains of its buildings and estates are today known as the Abbaye Sainte-Eugénie.

The earliest reference to the monastery is in the Notitia de servitio monasteriorum of 817 or 819. It is listed as the monasterium sanctae Eugeniae among the monasteries in Septimania owing the emperor their prayers, but not military service or tribute.

The editors of the Notitia located Sainte-Eugénie near Narbonne. In the 19th century, the Histoire générale de Languedoc and Antoine Sabarthès identified the monastery with the church of the same dedication in Villesèquelande, which was mentioned as a possession of the abbey of Montolieu in 931. This church is never referred to as a monastery, however.

The subsequent history of Sainte-Eugénie is very obscure. There is no other reference to it until 1163, when it had three monks and a number of lay brothers. Possibly it was abandoned and refounded only in the twelfth century. It lay along the Via Domitia not far from the coast, it may have been susceptible to bandits or pirates. On 6 December 1163, the viscountess Ermengarde of Narbonne granted the monastery the allodial on which it lay, thus renouncing her seigneurial rights. She also granted it a parcel of land on which to construct a mill. This donation was confirmed in August 1172.

Between 1175 and 1186, the monastery received further grants of land from the local nobility at Oubiels and Lastours. In 1178, they received from Archbishop Pons d'Arsac churches at Gaussan and Saint-André-de-Roquelongue and a community of lay sisters at Les Olieux, whose prior was Guilhem du Lac. During this period, the monks also made purchases. In 1178, they bought land at Gaussan from Lagrasse Abbey. This flurry of land acquisitions may reflect competition with Fontfroide. Monks may have been established at the priory of Les Olieux already by 1176. This Les Olieux, which was located at Montséret, must be distinguished from the female priory, also called Les Olieux, established at Les Monges in 1204.

In 1189, the monastery was absorbed by Fontfroide. At the time, it had six monks, three nuns (who lived at Les Olieux) and four lay brothers. Its prior, now Guilhem du Lac, and his five brothers formally donated the monastery and all its holdings to Fontfroide. The charter of donation survives, dated to 11 September 1189. In subsequent charters, the donation was confirmed by the viscountess and the archbishop, Bernard Gaucelin. Raimond de Bages, the prior of Les Olieux, also donated the properties of that house to Fontfroide. In exchange, Fontfroide agreed to take on Sainte-Eugénie's heavy debts, which had impoverished the monks. The monks and nuns moved into Fontfroide. The former priories became granges.

Monasticism at Sainte-Eugénie ended in 1636. Today, the estate is a winery. The Domaine Abbaye Sainte Eugénie is part of the Corbières AOC. It also produces Banyuls.

== Works cited ==
- Berman, Constance Hoffman (2000). The Cistercian Evolution: The Invention of a Religious Order in Twelfth-Century Europe. University of Pennsylvania Press.
- Langlois, Gauthier (2013). "Petits établissements monastiques masculins des Corbières: un encadrement religieux dense (IX^{e}–XIII^{e} siècle)" (PDF). Bulletin de la Société d'Études Scientifiques de l'Aude. 113: 51–68.
- Lesne, Émile (1920). "Les ordonnances monastiques de Louis le Pieux et la Notitia de servitio monasteriorum". Revue d'histoire de l'église de France. 6 (31): 161–75, 321–38 and 449–93. doi:10.3406/rhef.1920.2144.
