= Regula Mixta =

Printed edition of the Rule of Saint Benedict. The combination of its precepts with other monastic rules gave rise to the legislative tradition of the Regula Mixta.

Regula Mixta (Latin expression for "Mixed Rule") refers to an institutional and legislative practice of Christian monasticism in early medieval Europe (principally between the 6th and 9th centuries), in which monastic communities did not adopt the text of a single founder exclusively, but instead compiled, combined, and adapted excerpts from multiple codes of monastic life.

This pre-Carolingian tradition allowed abbots to adjust the demands of asceticism, liturgy, and community discipline to the reality of each monastery. The model frequently combined excerpts from the Rule of Saint Benedict with precepts from Columbanus, Caesarius of Arles, Isidore of Seville, Fructuosus of Braga, and John Cassian. The period of the Regula Mixta was gradually superseded by monastic reforms led by Benedict of Aniane and supported by Emperor Louis the Pious at the Council of Aachen, which imposed the Rule of Saint Benedict as the sole and compulsory norm for the Catholic West.

== Origin and historical context ==
During the early centuries of Western monasticism, there was no centralized authority tasked with standardizing religious life in celibate communities. Each foundation operated autonomously. The abbot exercised supreme legislative and spiritual authority over his monks, choosing the ancient rules and local customs that best suited his monastery's profile.

Against this backdrop of autonomy, the drafting of the Regula Mixta became a common procedure in Gaul, Visigothic Iberia, Ireland, and the British Isles. Compilers selected passages from different monastic legislative texts, combining penitential austerity with liturgical organization.

=== Main influences on the compilation ===
Among the rules most frequently used to form a Regula Mixta were:

- Rule of Saint Benedict: Appreciated for its discreet balance, legislative prudence, and solid organizational structure, widely documented in historical collections and manuscripts preserved within the Catholic Church tradition and the Vatican Apostolic Library.
- Rule of Saint Columbanus: Known for its penitential severity and ascetic rigor, characteristic of Celtic monasticism.
- Rule of Caesarius of Arles: Pioneering in the organization of female monasteries and the regulation of strict enclosure.
- Rule of Saint Basil and writings of John Cassian: Central sources of Eastern and Egyptian monasticism translated into Latin.
- Hispanic Rules: Developed by Isidore of Seville and Fructuosus of Braga, notable for strict discipline and legal precepts applied to Visigothic cenobites.

== Regional variants ==
=== Hiberno-Frankish mixture ===
During the 7th and 8th centuries, the expansion of Irish missions by Columbanus in Gaul gave rise to the "Hiberno-Frankish" model. Several monasteries (such as Luxeuil and Bobbio) united the rigor of Columbanus's rule with the flexibility of the Benedictine rule. Where Columbanus's rule imposed severe punitive discipline, Benedict's provided the framework for electing the abbot and managing material goods.

=== Visigothic monasticism in Hispania ===
In the Iberian Peninsula under Visigothic rule, monasteries operated based on local regional rules. The merging of Fructuosus's precepts with Isidore's Regula Monachorum was frequent. Through the influence of priests and pilgrim monks, portions of the Benedictine rule were integrated into local Visigothic norms, establishing a distinct Hispanic version of the Regula Mixta prior to the Islamic invasion.

== End of the Regula Mixta and Carolingian standardization ==
The diversity of rules began to be seen as an obstacle to the political and religious unity of the Carolingian Empire. Charlemagne initiated a standardization project by requesting a faithful copy of the original rule from the Monastery of Monte Cassino.

The definitive turning point occurred during the reign of Louis the Pious, driven by the reformist abbot Benedict of Aniane. At the Council of Aachen (816), the abolition of the Regula Mixta across the entire empire was decreed. Benedict of Aniane organized the Codex Regularum (a collection of ancient rules) and the Concordia Regularum, demonstrating that Benedictine precepts synthesized the tradition of the Desert Fathers. From that moment onward, the Rule of Saint Benedict became the compulsory norm for all Western monasteries, bringing an end to the era of monastic legislative plurality.

== See also ==
- Rule of Saint Benedict
- Benedict of Aniane
- Christian monasticism
- Celtic monasticism
- Council of Aachen (816)
