= Pont du Diable (Villemagne-l'Argentière) =

13th century bridge in southern France

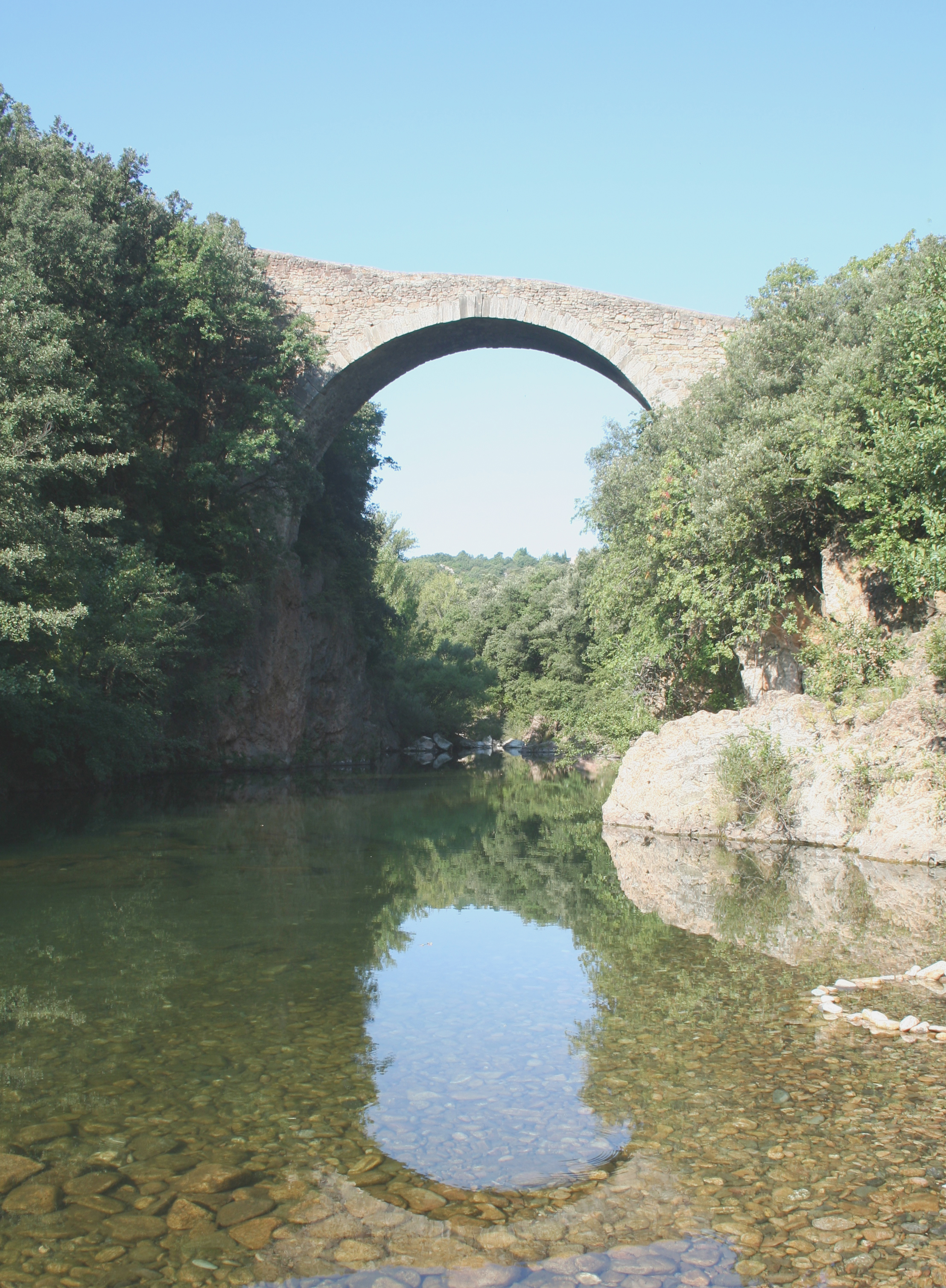
- Le Pont du Diable de Villemagne-l'Argentière (The Devil's bridge of Villemagne-l'Argentière)
- Coordinates: 43°37′30″N 3°07′00″E
- Crosses: Mare
- Locale: Villemagne-l'Argentière, Hérault, Occitanie, France

Characteristics
- Design: stone arch bridge
- Total length: 45 metres (148 ft)
- Width: 2 metres (6 ft 7 in)
- Height: 16 metres (52 ft)

History
- Construction end: End of 18th Century

Location
- Interactive map of Pont du Diable

The Pont du Diable de Villemagne-l'Argentière is a romanesque bridge in Villemagne-l'Argentière, in the Hérault department in France. It crosses the river Mare. It is built at a slope due to the different levels of the banks of the Mare.

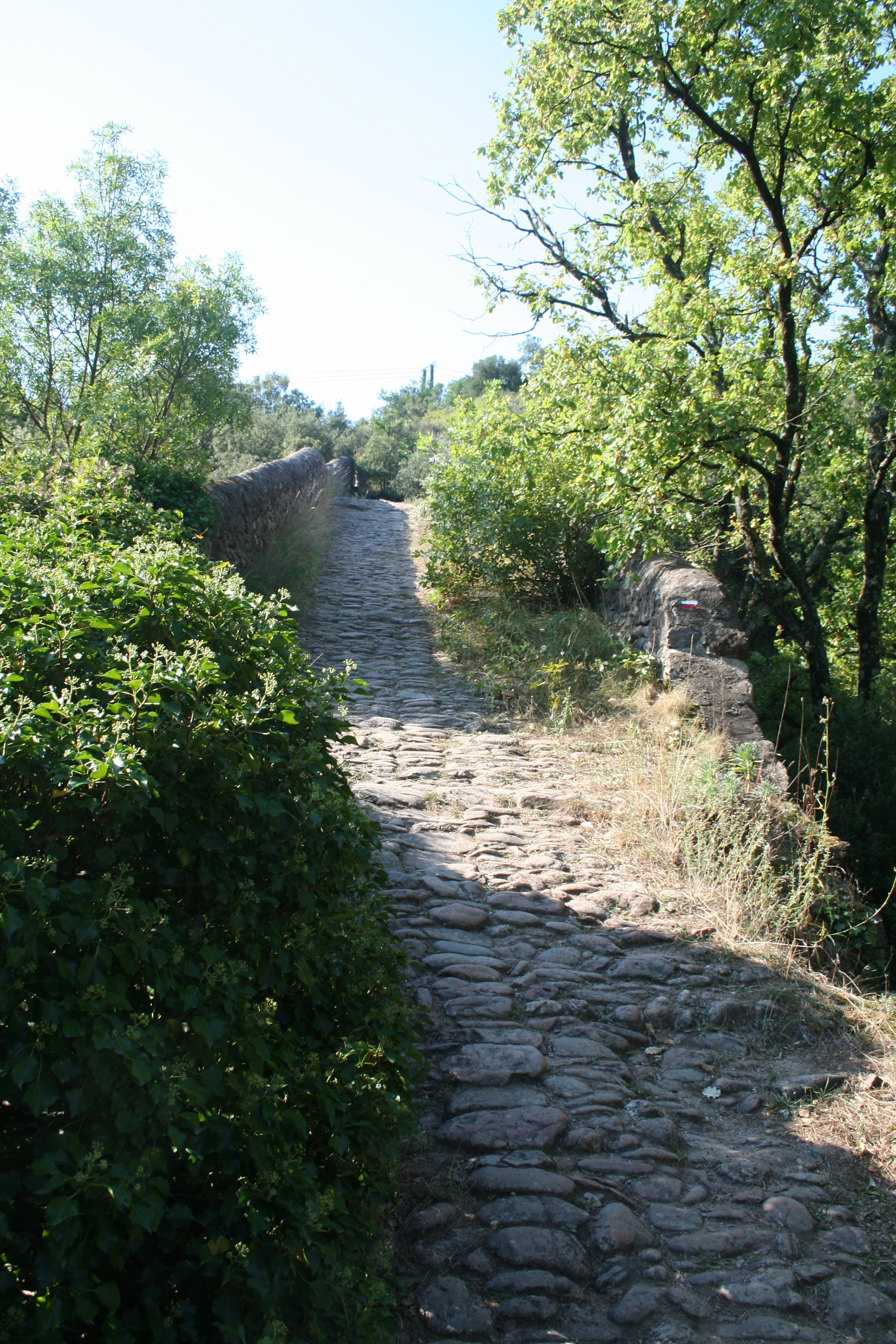
Road bed

== History ==
The bridge dates from the 13th century. It was built to allow the shipping of coal and lignite from Graissessac to the royal glassworks at Hérépian.

== Protection ==
The bridge was protected as a historic monument on the 27 May 1936. It is the property of the commune.

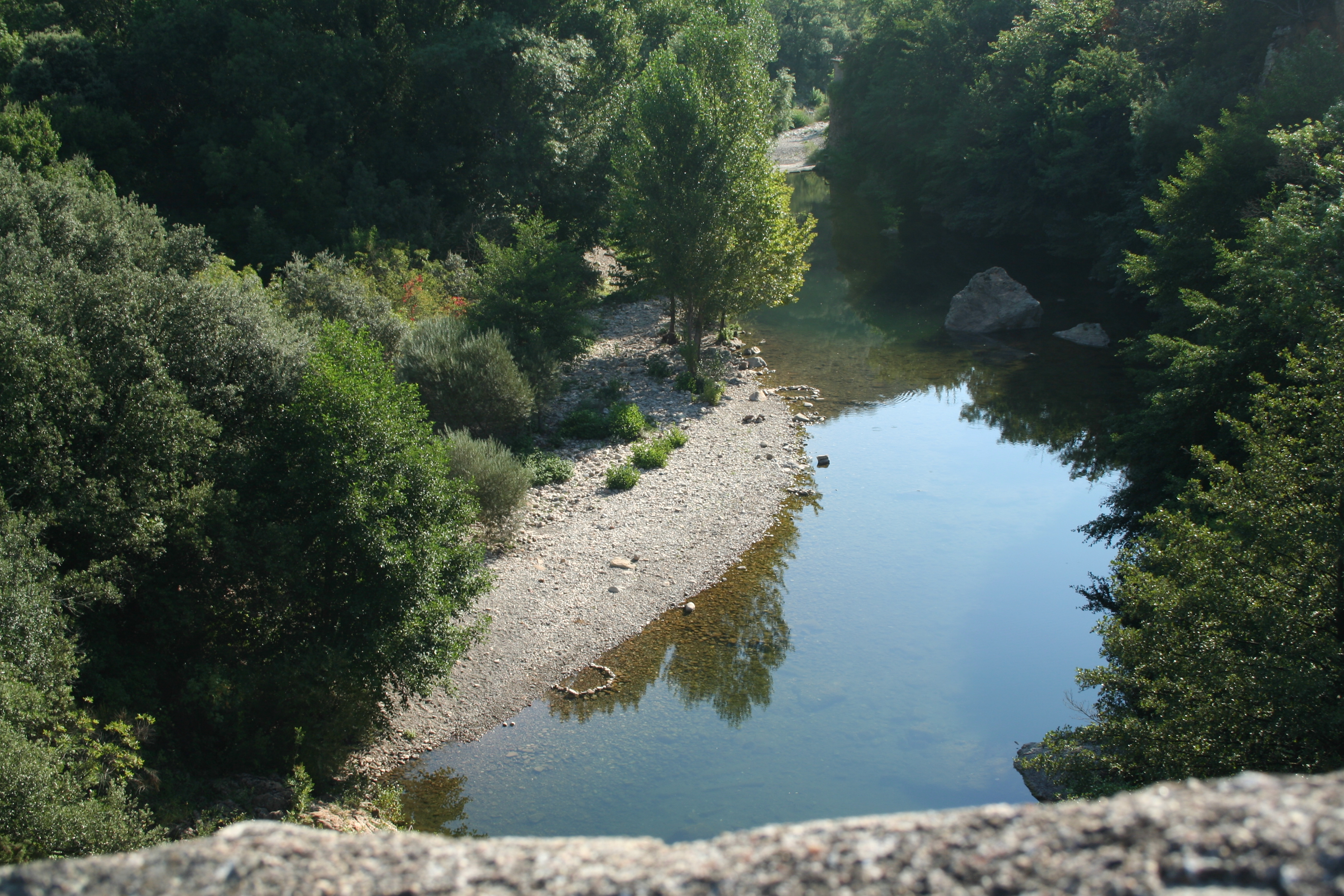
La Mare
