= Institutio canonicorum Aquisgranensis =

9th c. Church governance text

The Institutio canonicorum Aquisgranensis ('Instruction of Canons of Aachen') was a text disseminated in 816 at a church council gathered at Aachen (Aix-la-Chapelle) by Emperor Louis the Pious, which sought to distinguish canons from monks and to provide canons with a rule, called the Regula canonicorum (Rule of Canons) or Rule of Aix. The Institutio consists of a prologue, a collection of texts from Church Fathers, and the rule itself. Similar to Chrodegang's Rule (itself at times called the Regula canonicorum), it differed on certain points. It was, for instance, more insistent on canons living a common life, eating and sleeping together. Yet canons were allowed to hold private property, and, with their bishop's permission, even have their own houses.

In the beginning of the eleventh century, the Institutio itself and a version of Chrodegang's rule with interpolations from the Rule of Aix were put forth as models for reforming Cathedral chapters. During the Gregorian Reforms of the mid and later eleventh century, however, many reformers believed that the Institutio was not rigorous enough. These reforms helped to lead to the creation of the various forms of the Augustinian Rule. Canons still following the Rule of Aix were said to be part of the ordo antiquus (old order), as opposed to ordo novus (new order).

== Sources ==
- Dereine, Charles. "Chanoines (des origines au XIIIe s.)." In Dictionnaire d'histoire et de géographie ecclésiastiques, edited by Alfred Baudrillart, Albert de Meyer, and Van Cauwenbergh, vol. 12, 353–405. Paris: Librairie Letouzey et Ané, 1950.
- Veyrenche, Yannick. "Quia vos estis qui sanctorum patrum vitam probabilem renovatis... Naissance des chanoines réguliers, jusqu'à Urbain II." In Les chanoines réguliers: émergence et expansion (XIe-XIIIe siècles); actes du sixième colloque international du CERCOR, Le Puy en Velay, 19 juin-1er juillet 2006, edited by Michel Parisse, 29–69. Saint-Étienne: Publications de l'Université de Saint-Étienne, 2009.
- Werminghoff, Albert, ed. "Institutio canonicorum Aquisgranensis." In Monumenta Germaniae Historica Concilia 2, part 1, 307–421. Hanover: Impensis Bibliopolii Hahniani, 1906.
