= Dictionnaire d'histoire et de géographie ecclésiastiques =

Dictionnaire d'histoire et de géographie ecclésiastiques is an encyclopaedia founded by the future cardinal Alfred-Henri-Marie Baudrillart in 1912.

This immense and exhaustive work is currently edited by Luc Courtois and Eddy Louchez of the university of Louvain (UCLouvain) and published by Brepols of Turnhout. This encyclopedia, in French and English, covers mainly subjects, people and places related to the Christian tradition and follows a strict alphabetical order.

The first fascicule (from entry Aachs) was published in 1912 and the publication follows regularly year after year. In 2015 this encyclopedia arrived at fascicule 185 (containing entries from Leyen to Licayrac). The whole work is published also in volumes, and up to 2015 the volumes published are 31 (up to entry Licayrac). The two subsequent fascicules are, unlike earlier fascicules, selective in content.
