= Aniane =

- Commune
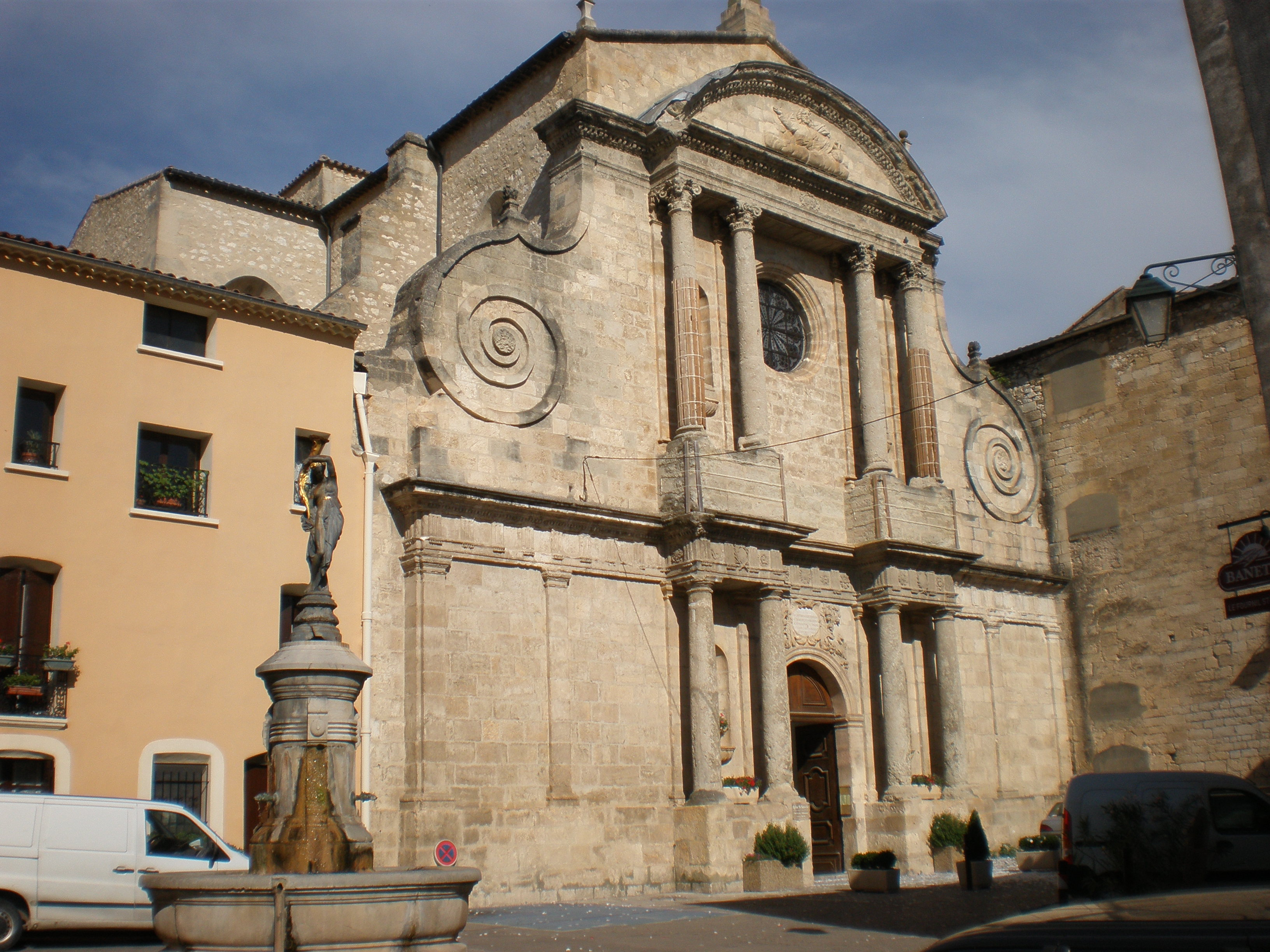
- Church of Saint-Sauveur

- Coat of arms
- Location of Aniane
- Location within France Location within Occitanie
- Coordinates: 43°41′10″N 3°35′12″E
- Country: France
- Region: Occitania
- Department: Hérault
- Arrondissement: Lodève
- Canton: Gignac
- Intercommunality: Vallée de l'Hérault

Government
  - Mayor (2020–2026): Philippe Salasc
- Area^{1}: 30.34 km^{2} (11.71 sq mi)
- Elevation: 62 m (203 ft)
- Highest elevation: 367 m (1,204 ft)
- Lowest elevation: 36 m (118 ft)
- Population (2023): 2,979
  - Density: 98.19/km^{2} (254.3/sq mi)
- Time zone: UTC+01:00 (CET)
  - Summer (DST): UTC+02:00 (CEST)
- INSEE/Postal code: 34010 /34150
- ^{1} French Land Register data, which excludes lakes, ponds, glaciers > 1 km^{2} (0.386 sq mi or 247 acres) and river estuaries.

Aniane (French pronunciation: [anjan]; Occitan: Aniana) is a commune in the Hérault department in the Occitanie region in southern France.

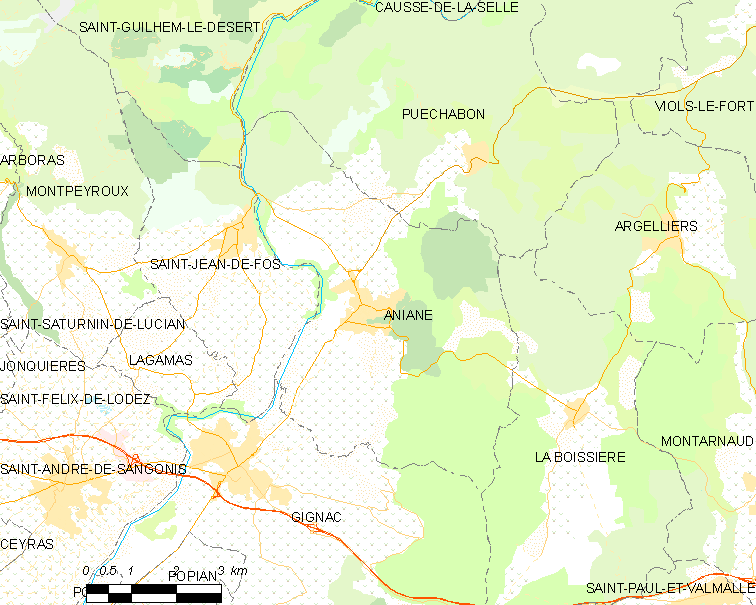
Map

== Population ==
Historical population
Year	Pop.	±% p.a.
1968	1,773	—
1975	1,684	−0.73%
1982	1,617	−0.58%
1990	1,725	+0.81%
1999	2,098	+2.20%
2007	2,656	+2.99%
2012	2,872	+1.58%
2017	2,931	+0.41%
2023	2,979	+0.27%
Source: INSEE

== See also ==
- Abbey of Aniane
- Benedict of Aniane
- Chronicle of Aniane
- Pont du Diable, Hérault
- Mas de Daumas Gassac
- Communes of the Hérault department
