= Synods of Aachen (816–819) =

The Synods of Aachen between 816 and 819 were a landmark in regulations for the monastic life in the Frankish realm. The Benedictine Rule was declared the universally valid norm for communities of monks and nuns, while canonical orders were distinguished from monastic communities and unique regulations were laid down for them: the Institutio canonicorum Aquisgranensis. The synods of 817 and 818/819 completed the reforms. Among other things, the relationship of church properties to the king was clarified.

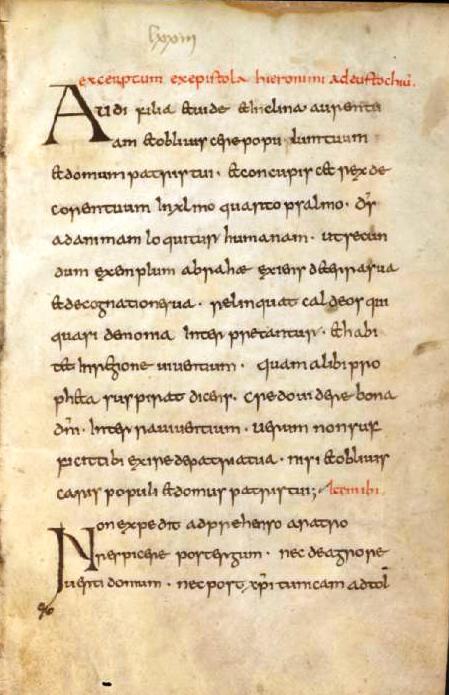
Manuscript of the canonical regulations laid down at the Synod of Aachen (Dombibliothek Würzburg M.p.th.q.25 Concilium Aquisgranense a. 816. Institutio sanctimonialium Aquisgranensis)

== Background ==
The monastic life played an important role in spiritual and intellectual life in the Frankish realm. The orders had important tasks in church life. But they were also significant for the economic and intellectual integration of new territories, such as Saxony into the empire; several cloisters were closely connected with the ruling house.

However, the orders were not uniformly organised. In the previous centuries, mixed rules (regula mixta) dominated. Such a mixed rule was even imported to Monte Cassino after its refoundation in the eighth century. In the Frankish realm the Benedictine Rule was frequently mixed with the Columbine Rule. Furthermore, orders of canons and canonesses had developed alongside the orders of monks and nuns. There were also mixtures between these two basic types of holy order.

Charlemagne began to regulate the monastic life in 789, with the Admonitio generalis. Among other things, it declared that obedience to the Benedictine Rule should be central for the orders. The decisions of a synod in Aachen in 802 built on that. Visitations to the orders followed. A court day (Hoftag) held in the second half of the year ruled, that in future the Benedictine Rule should be the sole binding rule for monastic orders. Nevertheless, there continued to be a number of orders following other regulations.

== Proceedings ==
Louis the Pious appointed Benedict of Aniane to enforce the Benedictine Rule throughout the empire, shortly after his accession. The Emperor summoned an imperial synod at Aachen in August 816. The main issues of this synod were the reform of the monastic life and the regulation of the canonical life. The synods were preceded by very intensive preparations, including a list of the issues to be addressed which Benedict of Aniane had collated.

According to the imperial capitulary in which the results were published, the discussion took place in the Royal Palace of Aachen. Abbots and monks participated and the Emperor himself was personally present, even intervening in the debates. Bishops and important secular officials took part as well. A list of the participants does not exist. Among them was Hetto of Trier and Adalhoh of Strassbourg. Hildebold of Cologne, as archchaplain, was probably present. Magnus of Sens and Agobard of Lyon left early. The Abbots in attendance included Ando of Malmedy Stablo in Aachen and Helysacher of St Maximin in Trier, who was also in charge of the Imperial chancellery. Ratgar of Fulda might have been present as well, since his abbey was very well informed on the results of the synod. Haito of Reichenau Abbey also took part.

=== Monastic lifestyle ===
Only minimal notes exist about the course of the synod. A central point was the orientation of the monastic life along the lines of the Benedictine Rule. As important as Benedict of Aniane's role was, he was not always able to prevail despite his position. An important point was the plan to force monasteries' to conform to the liturgical practice of the Benedictines. The bishops who would not tolerate any deviation from the Roman Rite, opposed this. Eventually a compromise was reached on this point. There was also controversy about whether the property of novices should be taken by the monastery or returned to their families. There was discussion on other technical issues as well.

But in the core matters, Benedict of Aniane took on an authoritative role. He explained the Benedictine Rule to the participants, clarified doubts, and refuted errors of interpretation. He said that everything which conformed with the rule was good. He succeeded in making the Benedictine Rule the general norm for the monastic life in the Frankish realm. The decisions made in Aachen deviated from the original rule only in minor details. These were mostly traditions built up over the preceding centuries. Benedict of Aniane himself did not dare to make a radical break with tradition and, as a result, some non-Benedictine elements were maintained, but he tried to make the regulations enacted come as close to the original Rule as possible.

Overall, the regulation of the Benedictine Rule was a significant step. This is sometimes seen as the real beginning of the Benedictine order. All orders founded in the following centuries were organised in accordance with the principles of this rule. The rules of the mendicant orders founded in the thirteenth century were the first to diverge from this basis.

=== Canons and canonesses ===
Another important aspect was to define monks and canons in relation to one another and to end the mixing of the two lifestyles which had begun in the eighth century. There had been attempts at this for some time already - the rule of Chrodegang of Metz issued around 755 had closely anticipated this standardisation - but there had been only limited success. In Aachen, Louis the Pious demanded that the rules for the communal life of canons should be collected from the old books. Some bishops were not convinced of the necessity of this, but such a collection was nevertheless created, which was agreed to by the council. This consisted of a rule for canons (Institutio canonicorum) and one for canonesses (Institutio sanctimonialium).

The canons were required to celebrate general services and the liturgy of the hours and to maintain a communal life in an enclosed area, which was required to include a common dormitory and a common dining hall. Unlike monks and nuns, canons were permitted to keep personal possessions, though personal poverty was to be the ideal for them too. They would not be allowed to lay aside any lifelong vows. Provosts would oversee canonical communities. In many respects, the lives of canonesses was similarly regulated, but their communities were to be led by Abbesses.

The first Stift communities were established in 816 and 817. In the following two centuries it was often unclear in practice whether a particular Stift was an order of canonesses of a nunnery.

=== Completion and publication ===
On account of the numerous areas of the monastic life to be regulated, the discussions were not simple and they lasted for a long time, before the participants could summarise their decisions in thirty six canons and submit them to Louis for confirmation. These canons were published and made binding for the empire in a capitulary of 23 August 816. Various participants had already publicised partial results before this. The enforcement, or rather the monitoring of implementation was carried out over the following years by missi dominici and ecclesiastical representatives. The archbishops of the realm were especially involved.

== Synods of 817–819 ==
The synod of 817 built on the decisions of the previous year. On 10 July it adopted a capitulare monasticum (Monastic capitulary), containing the rulings of the previous year. From the end of 818 to the beginning of 819, a further synod was held in Aachen. It produced the Notitia de servitio monasteriorum, a list of reformed monasteries and the services they owed the crown. This brought the monastic reforms to an end. A Hoftag was held in parallel with this synod. Among other things, the relationship between the ruler and the church was clarified. Monasteries and bishoprics were granted voting rights, but the king held the customary rights and the right of investiture. He was allowed to continue to appoint the leaders of canonical orders. The power of ecclesiastical institutions in the Empire was thus further enshrined.

Overall, the rulings marked the end of the variety of earlier monastic lifestyles in favor of a uniform standard. Uniform structures marked a strengthening of the Imperial church. This was a factor in the maintenance of Imperial unity.

== Bibliography ==
- Josef Semmler. "Die Beschlüsse des Aachener Konzils im Jahr 816." Zeitschrift für Kirchengeschichte 1963 pp. 15–82
- Georg Schwaiger. Mönchtum, Orden, Klöster. Von den Anfängen bis zur Gegenwart. München, 1993 p. 93 & pp. 136f.
- Gert Melville. Die Welt der mittelalterlichen Klöster: Geschichte und Lebensformen. München, 2012.
- Roman Deutinger. Geschichtsquellen des deutschen Mittelalters. Konzilien und Synoden 742–1002. Version, 2008 Digitalisat (PDF; 974 kB).
