= Benedict of Aniane =

8th/9th-century Frankish saint

Saint Benedict of Aniane
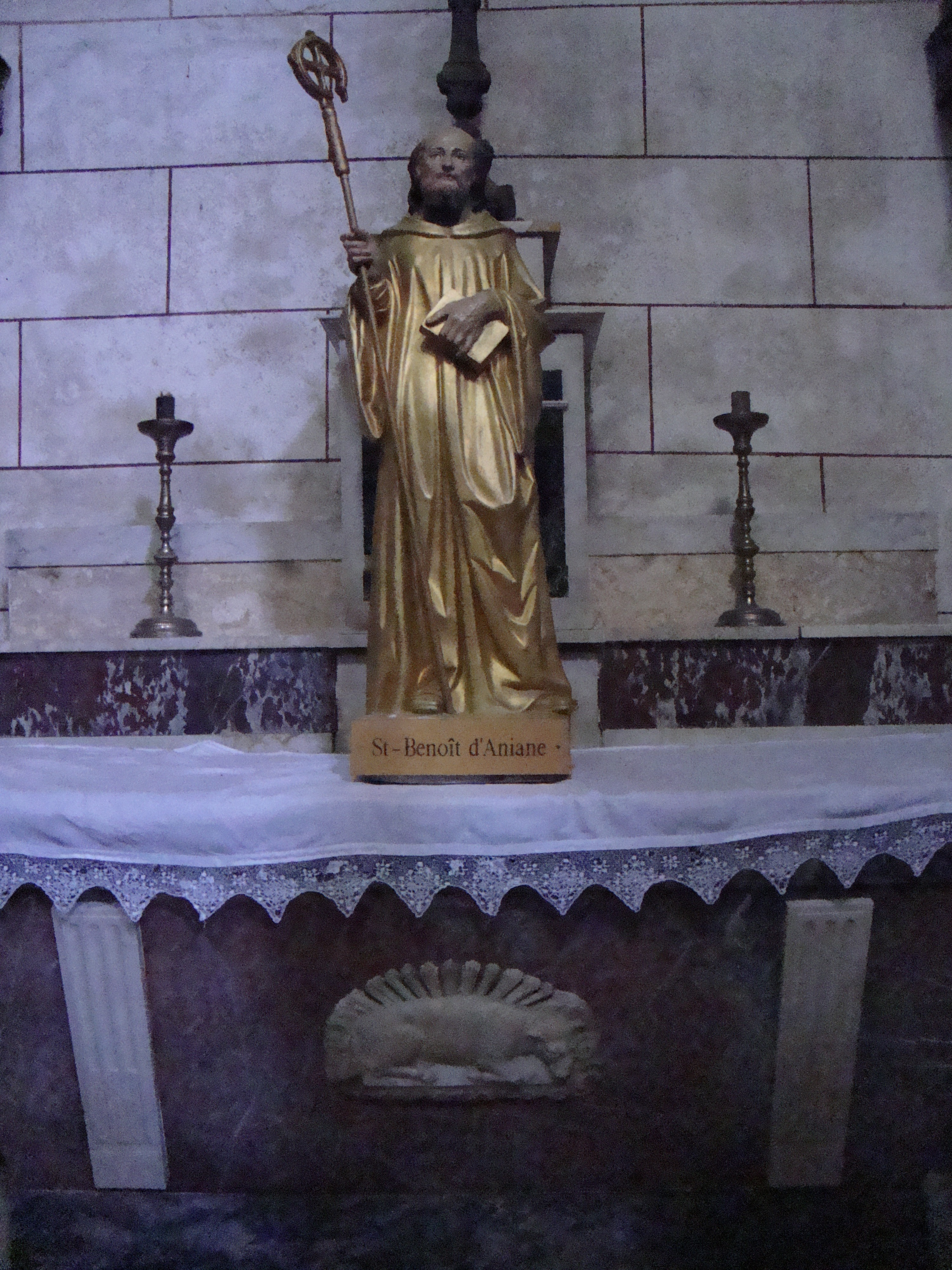

Confessor
- Born: 747; Kingdom of the Franks
- Died: 12 February 821
- Venerated in: Catholic Church; Eastern Orthodox Church
- Feast: 12 February

Benedict of Aniane (Latin: Benedictus Anianensis; German: Benedikt von Aniane; c. 747 – 12 February 821 AD), born Witiza and called the Second Benedict, was a Benedictine monk and monastic reformer who had a substantial impact on the religious practice of the Carolingian Empire. His feast day is either February 11 or 12, depending on the liturgical calendar.

== Life ==
According to Ardo, Benedict's biographer, he was the son of a Visigoth, Aigulf, Count of Maguelonne (Magalonensis comes). Originally given the Gothic name Witiza, he was educated at the Frankish court of Pippin the Younger, and entered the royal service as a page. He served at the court of Charlemagne and took part in his Italian campaign of 773, where he almost drowned in the Ticino River near Pavia while attempting to save his brother. The experience led him to act on a resolve which had been slowly forming in him, to renounce the world and live the monastic life. He later left the court and was received into the monastery of Saint Sequanus, the Abbey of Saint-Seine.

At Saint-Seine, Benedict was made cellarer and then elected abbot, but realizing the monks would never conform to his strict practices he left and returned to his father's estates in Languedoc, where he built a hermitage. Around 780, he founded a monastic community based on Eastern asceticism at Aniane in Languedoc. This community did not develop as he had intended. In 782, he founded another monastery based on Benedictine Rule, at the same location. His success there gave him considerable influence, which he used to found and reform a number of other monasteries, eventually becoming the effective abbot of all the monasteries of Charlemagne's empire.

In 781 Louis the Pious became King of Aquitaine and asked Benedict to reform the monasteries in his territory. Later, as Emperor, he entrusted him with the coordination of practices and communication among the monasteries within his domains. He had a wide knowledge of patristic literature, and churchmen such as Alcuin sought his counsel.

In 814, Louis, now Emperor, had Benedict found a monastery on the river Inde near the court at Aachen. The monastery was at first called the "Monastery of the Redeemer on the Inde", but came to be known as Kornelimünster Abbey.

He was the head of a council of abbots which in 817 at Aachen created a code of regulations, or "Codex regularum", which would be binding on all their houses. Benedict sought to restore the primitive strictness of the monastic observance wherever it had been relaxed or exchanged for the less exacting canonical life. Shortly thereafter, he compiled a "Concordia regularum". Sections of the Benedictine rule (except ix-xvi) are given in their order, with parallel passages from the other rules included in the Liber regularum, so as to show the agreement of principles and thus to enhance the respect due to the Benedictine. He was primarily an ecclesiastic, who zealously placed his considerable theological learning at the service of orthodoxy and the cause of Benedictine monasticism. Although these new codes fell into disuse shortly after the deaths of Benedict and his patron, Emperor Louis the Pious, they did have lasting effects on Western monasticism.

Benedict died at Kornelimünster Abbey on 11 February 821, in the monastery Louis had built for him to serve as the base for Benedict's supervisory work. He was buried the next day on February 12, hence why some list his feast day as the 11th and some the 12th.

== Works ==
- For Benedict's writings, see Codex regularum monasticarum et canonicarum in Patrologia Latina, CIII, 393-702.
- Concordia regularum, ed. Pierre Bonnerue, Corpus Christianorum Continuatio Medaevalis, vol. 168/168A, Turnhout: Brepols 1999.
- Letters, PL 103:703-1380.

Other treatises (PL103:1381ff) ascribed to him are probably not authentic.

== Works and editions ==
- Codex regularum monasticarum, edited by Jacques Paul Migne (Patrologia Latina, 103) in 1864,
- Concordia regularum, edited by Pierre Bonnerue in 1999,
- Epistola ad Guarnerium, edited by Ernst Ludwig Dümmler in 1895,
- Excerptus diversarum modus penitentiarum a Benedicto abbate distinctus de regula sancti Benedicti abbatis, edited by Josef Semmler in 1963,

== See also ==
- Abbey of Aniane

== Bibliography ==
- Ardo Smaragdus, Life, op. cit., CIII, 353 sqq.;
- Monumenta Germaniae Historica: Script., XV, I, 200-220;
- Acta Sanctorum, Feb., II, 606 sqq.;
- NICOLAI, Der hl. Benedict, Gründer von Aniane und Cornelimünster (Cologne, 1865);
- PAULINIER, S. Benoit d'Aniane et la fondation du monastere de ce nom (Montpellier, 1871);
- FOSS, Benedikt von Aniane (Berlin, 1884);
- PUCKERT, Aniane und Gellone (Leipzig, 1899);
