= Church of Saint Cecilia in Cos =

Chapel dedicated to Saint Cecilia

Coordinates: 42°25′01″N 2°33′33″E

Church of Sainte-Cécile de Cos
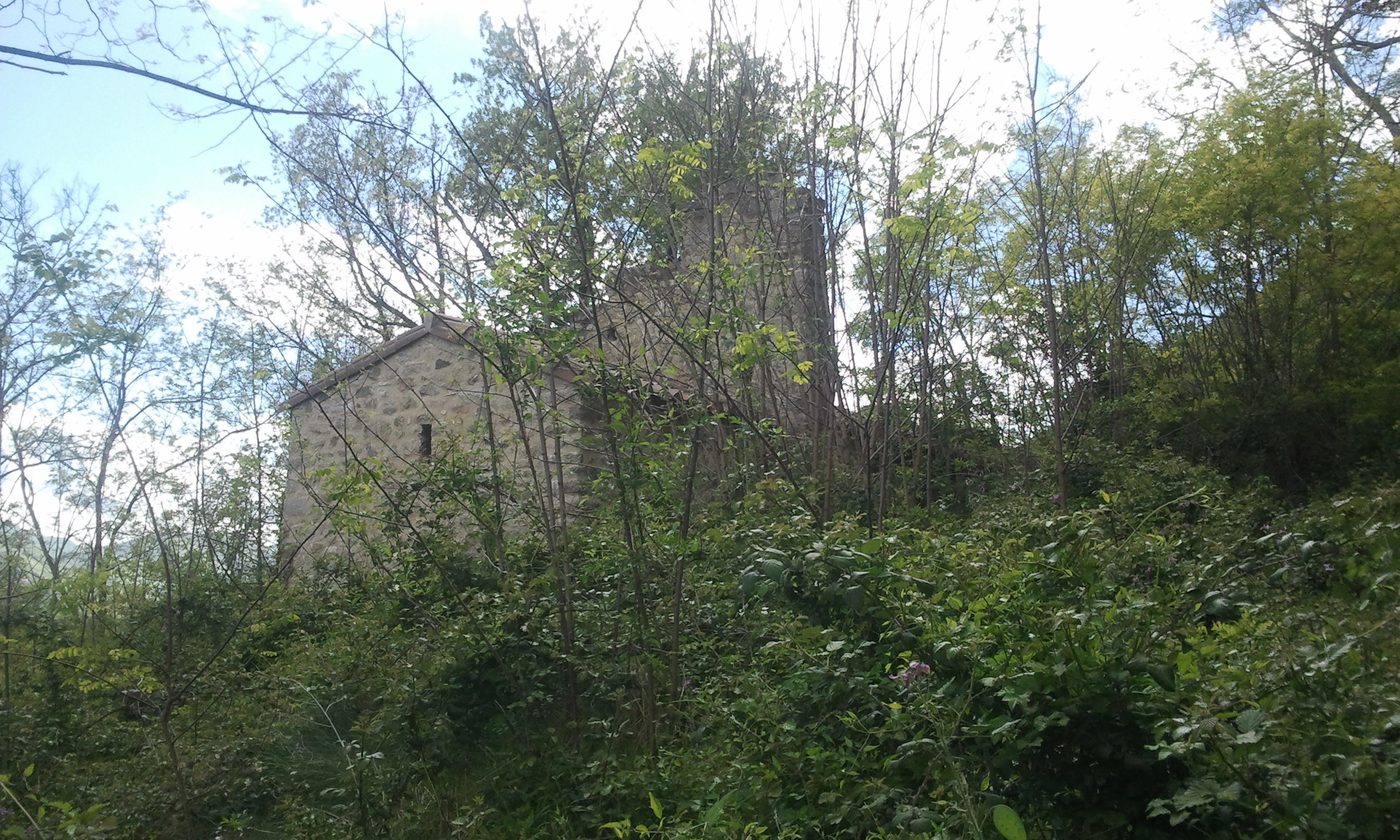
- Church of Sainte-Cécile de Cos seen from the east

Religion
- District: Le Tech
- Province: Pyrénées-Orientales
- Region: Occitanie
- Deity: Saint Cecilia
- Type: Church

Location
- Country: France
- Interactive map of Church of Sainte-Cécile de Cos

Architecture
- Style: Pre-Romanesque art
- Completed: 10th or early 12th century

The church of Sainte-Cécile de Cos (Catalan: Santa Cecília de Cos or Santa Cecília de Coç) is a pre-Romanesque and Romanesque church built between the 9th and 11th centuries in Le Tech, in the French department of Pyrénées-Orientales.

Sainte-Cécile de Cos is a small, disused rural chapel. It has twelve meters long and is built on a simple plan: a rectangular nave extended to the east by a flat apse, all lit by a few narrow, single-splayed windows. Devoid of any furnishings, its ruins were restored in the 20th century.

The history of Sainte-Cécile began in the 9th century under the patronage of Saint Mary, when it became a possession of the abbey of Sainte-Marie d'Arles-sur-Tech. As Cos' territory grew, it was enlarged and embellished, and became a parish church in 1159.

This status was lost around 1600, and the chapel was gradually abandoned. It was looted during the Roussillon war (late 18th century). By the 1990s, as it fell into disuse and ruin, its walls were raised and a concrete vault erected to protect it.

== Location ==
The Canigou massif is the most eastern of the Pyrenean massifs, rising above 2,000 m. Located in the French department of Pyrénées-Orientales, it separates the natural and historic Catalan regions of Vallespir to the south and Conflent to the north.

On the southern flank of this massif, at an altitude of around 650 m, stands the church of Sainte-Cécile de Cos, on a south-facing shoulder overlooking the valley of the river Tech by 150 m, in the commune also known as Le Tech. It is overlooked by a small plateau known as pla de Cos, and a stony spur on top of which stands the tower of Cos.

The church stands on the D44 departmental road between Le Tech and Montferrer, between Mas Sainte-Cécile and Mas de Cos.

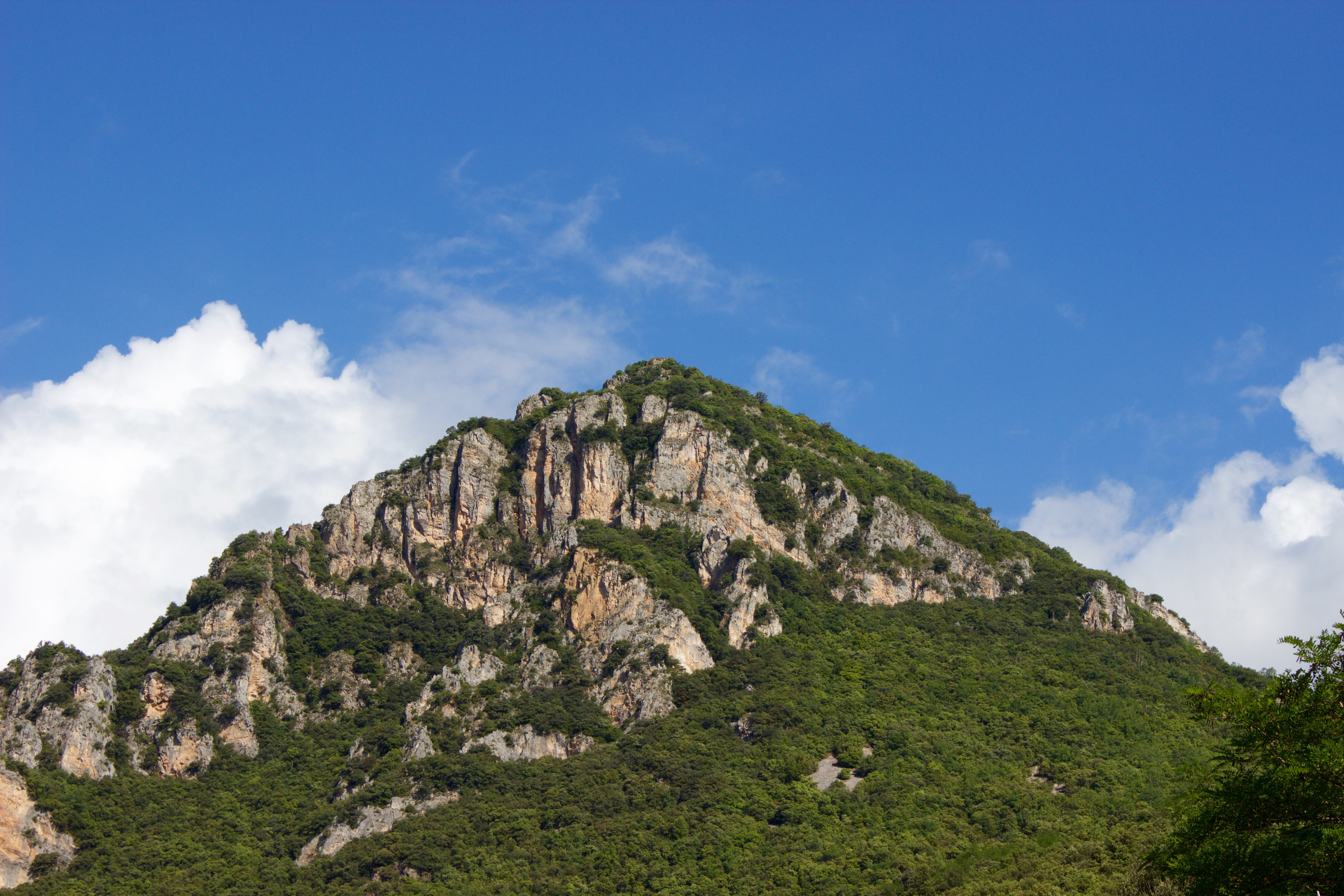
The rock of Cos seen from Sainte-Cécile

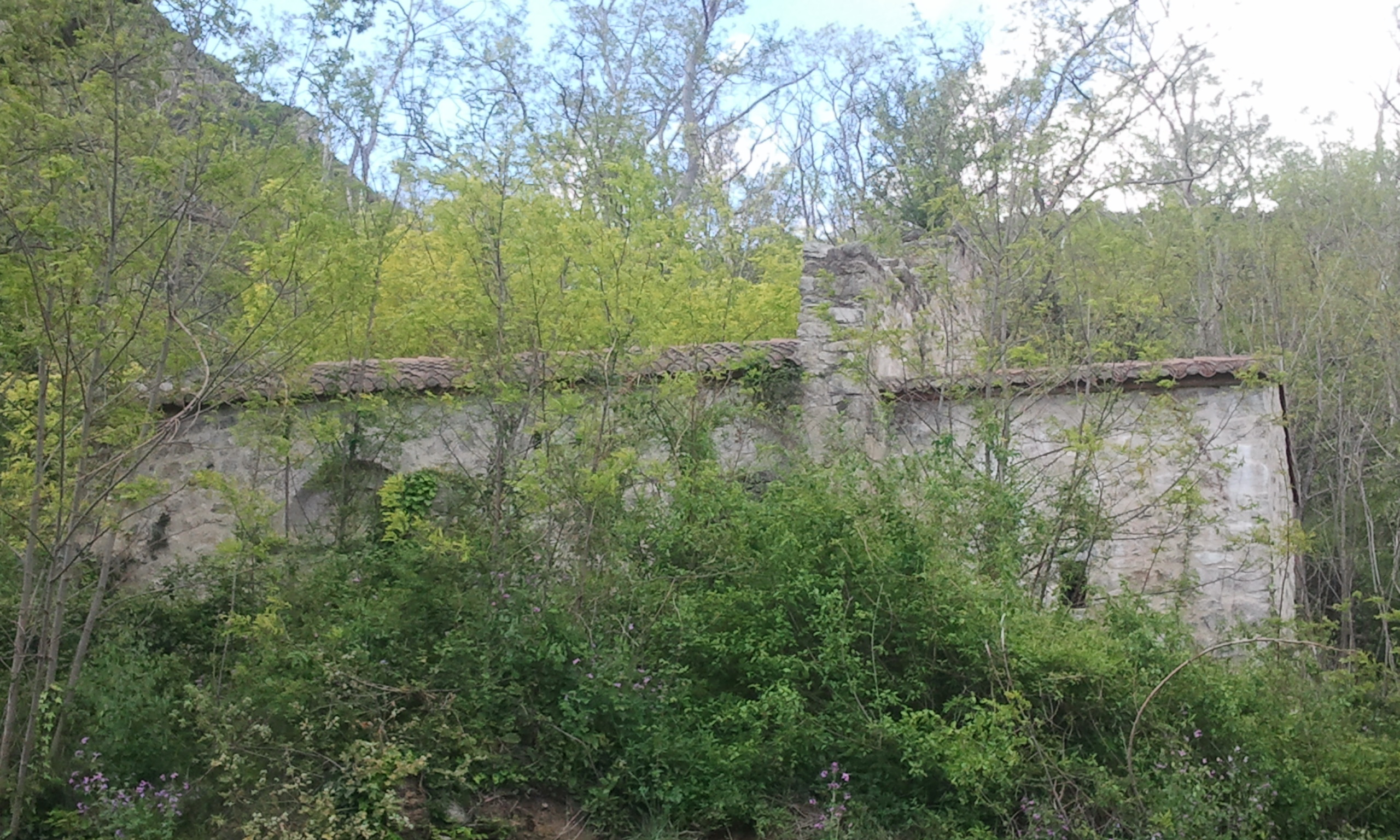
Sainte-Cécile seen from the road

== Toponymy ==
In the name Cos, the s is pronounced as in "cosse".

In the 9th century, the various known forms of the name Cos are Cotsio (in 869), Cotso (in 881), and Cotxo. Cocio appears in a text from 1036. The Catalan name is Cos according to Lluís Basseda and the Nomenclàtor toponímic de la Catalunya del Nord from the University of Perpignan, while the Gran Enciclopèdia Catalana and Catalunya romànica use Coç.

This name probably derives from that of a person and a domain: either the Germanic Cottio, or the Latin Coccius. These two forms may have given rise to Cotx, then Cox and finally Cos. Other origins have been proposed: the Latin words Cotis ("stones") or Cursus ("passage"), but these forms, according to the rules of evolution of the Romance language, would not have given Cotx, but Cots or Cors.

According to Aymat Catafau, the first mention of Sainte-Cécile church in a text dates back to 1159. According to Jean Ribes, the church was previously dedicated to Saint Mary.

== History ==
=== La cella de Cos ===
In the context of the Catalan Middle Ages, a cella (modern Catalan: cel-la) is a place where a small monastic community lives, first independently and then, from the Carolingian period onwards, under the sway of an abbey. Monks lived there, celebrated mass, cleared and cultivated the land. It was under the impetus of the Benedictine monks that, in the 9th and 10th centuries, after the retreat of the Moors, the population of Vallespir grew, with the cellae and monasteries crystallizing around them centers of population.

In the 9th century, the cella of Cos is mentioned in three diplomas granted by the Carolingian kings to the abbey of Arles-sur-Tech. A precept from Charles II the Bald, dated February 23, 869, lists the cella quae vocatur Cotsio ("cella called Cotsio") among the abbey's possessions, granting it the privilege of free movement for monks and immunity. In 878, Louis the Stammerer confirmed this immunity for Abbot Castellan II, and granted the Arles monastery free election of its abbot. This text also defined the limits of Cos' territory. On August 30, 881, Carloman II again confirmed the immunity of the abbot of Arles, named Suniefred, and his possessions, including the Cella de Cotso.

The site of the cella is on a relatively important route at the time, connecting the Conflent, from Vinça, to Vallespir and extending from Cos towards the southern Pyrenees, either via the Notre-Dame-du-Coral hermitage, or via the Sainte-Marguerite chapel on the Col d'Ares, where there is a hospice. The cella of Cos, like Notre-Dame-del-Coral and the chapel on the Col d'Ares, served as a refuge for travelers on this route, both pilgrims on their way to Santiago de Compostela and migrants seeking work in the region. Indeed, throughout the Middle Ages, the Vallespir and Canigou massif were in great demand, particularly for ironworking (mines, forges, trade), so much so that part of the route was called "la route du fer" (el cami del ferro).

At this time, according to Jean Ribes, the cella chapel was dedicated to St. Mary.

It was probably during the second half of the 9th century that a very small place of worship (of which only the apse remains today) was built, along with a building used as a refuge for travelers. This sanctuary was extended by a triumphal arch and a vaulted nave around the year 1000.

=== The parish of Sainte-Cécile ===
In the 11th century, living conditions continued to improve for the region's inhabitants, with the emergence of a cloth and fabric industry in Vallespir: weaving workshops and mills were set up, and textile plants were cultivated.

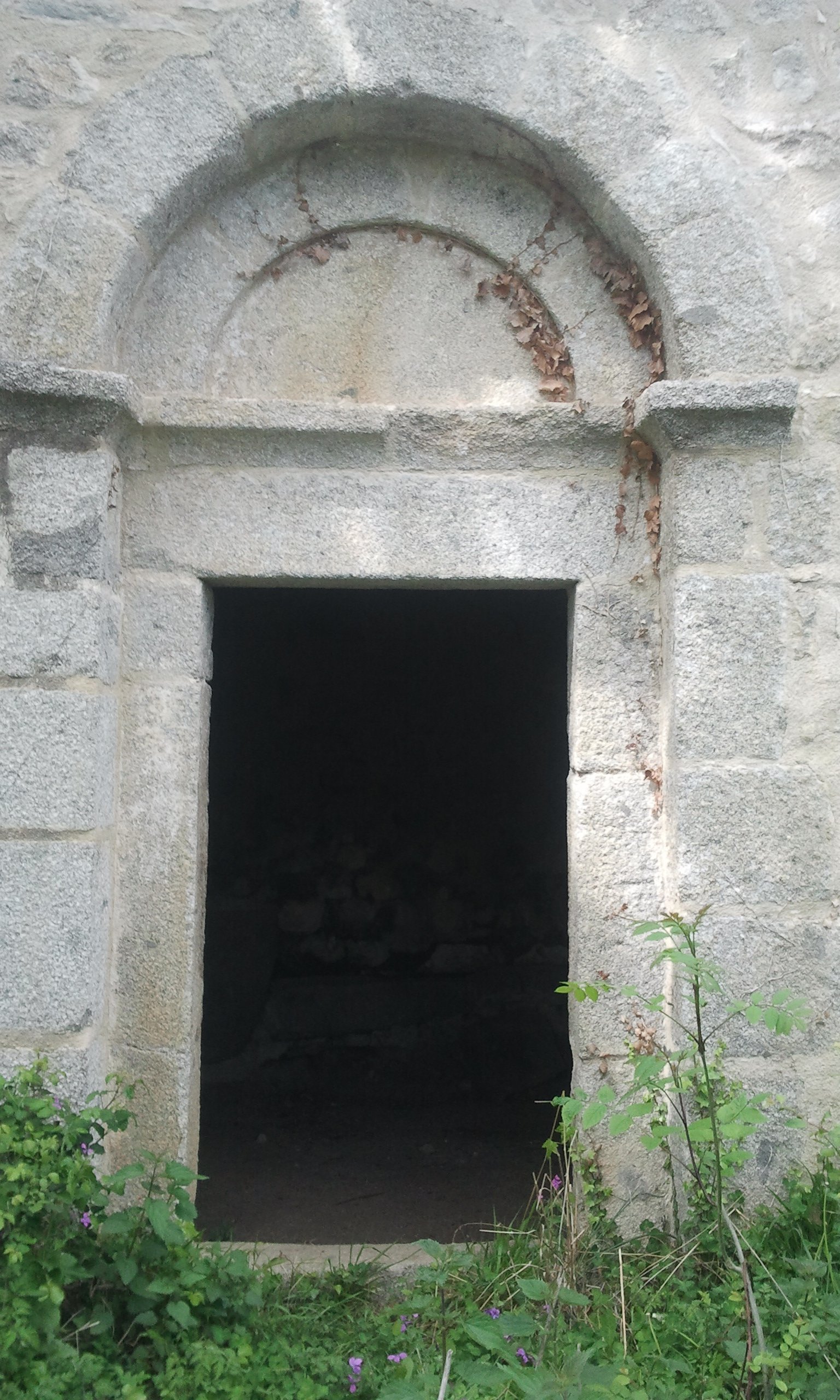
The Sainte-Cécile portal may date from 1159.

The growth of the population around the Cos cella led to the creation of a parish. The church was consecrated once again (perhaps the third time), becoming a parish church under the patronage of Saint Cecilia on October 21, 1159. The bishop of Elne, Artal III, consecrated other churches belonging to the Arles abbey at this time, in a short time: Saint-Martin de Corsavy, on October 12, 1158; Saint-Étienne d'Arles, on October 19 of the same year; Saint-Pierre de Riuferrer, on November 15, 1159; the chapel of Saint-Laurent in the parish of Coustouges, on November 22, 1159.

In addition to the bishop of Elne, the ceremony was attended by numerous notables from the entire region: Abbot Raymond d'Arles-sur-Tech, who was behind the new consecration, the canon of Elne cathedral, as well as the lords of Cos, Montferrer, Brouilla, Passa and Villelongue, and, according to Jean Ribes, "a multitude of faithful, some from very far away". The current portal may have been rebuilt on this occasion, as was a porch added in front of the church to accommodate the large number of worshippers.

The house annexed to the church was donated to the parish, along with an income equal to one-third of the tithes collected on its territory. Various privileges were granted to the parish priest, including the right to report directly to the abbot of Arles, rather than to the village batlle (equivalent to mayor or bailiff). A cemetery, where the inhabitants were to be buried, was created next to the church. The founding text of the parish also defined its territory. It comprises four large farms named La Font, Puig Rodon, Manyacas and Cos, as well as several isolated dwellings, and extends as far as the village of Le Tech. The village is divided between two parishes: the rue d'Amont (or carrer d'Amunt) belongs to the parish of Sainte-Cécile, and the rest to the parish of Sainte-Juste-et-Sainte-Ruffine de Prats-de-Mollo. The parish's territory is bounded by the Coll de Maures pass and the three rivers Coumelade, Fou and Tech.

In the 13th century, a signal tower (known as the Tour de Cos) was erected atop the rocky spur overlooking the church.

In the 15th and 16th centuries, the four farmhouses in the parish of Sainte-Cécile were no longer generating sufficient income for their owners, who had to pay heavy charges to the Abbey of Arles. They changed hands several times, sometimes in the form of simple donations.

In 1547, a newcomer settled in the parish. He was a merchant from the Ossau valley (at the other end of the Pyrenees), named Joanoto de Trescases. As early as 1548, he began buying up land. After his death in 1559, his estate was extended by his son Jacques, who owned almost the entire parish. In 1623, Jacques' son Jean-Michel obtained relief from the Abbey of Arles from the numerous taxes and servitudes.

=== Decay and ruin ===
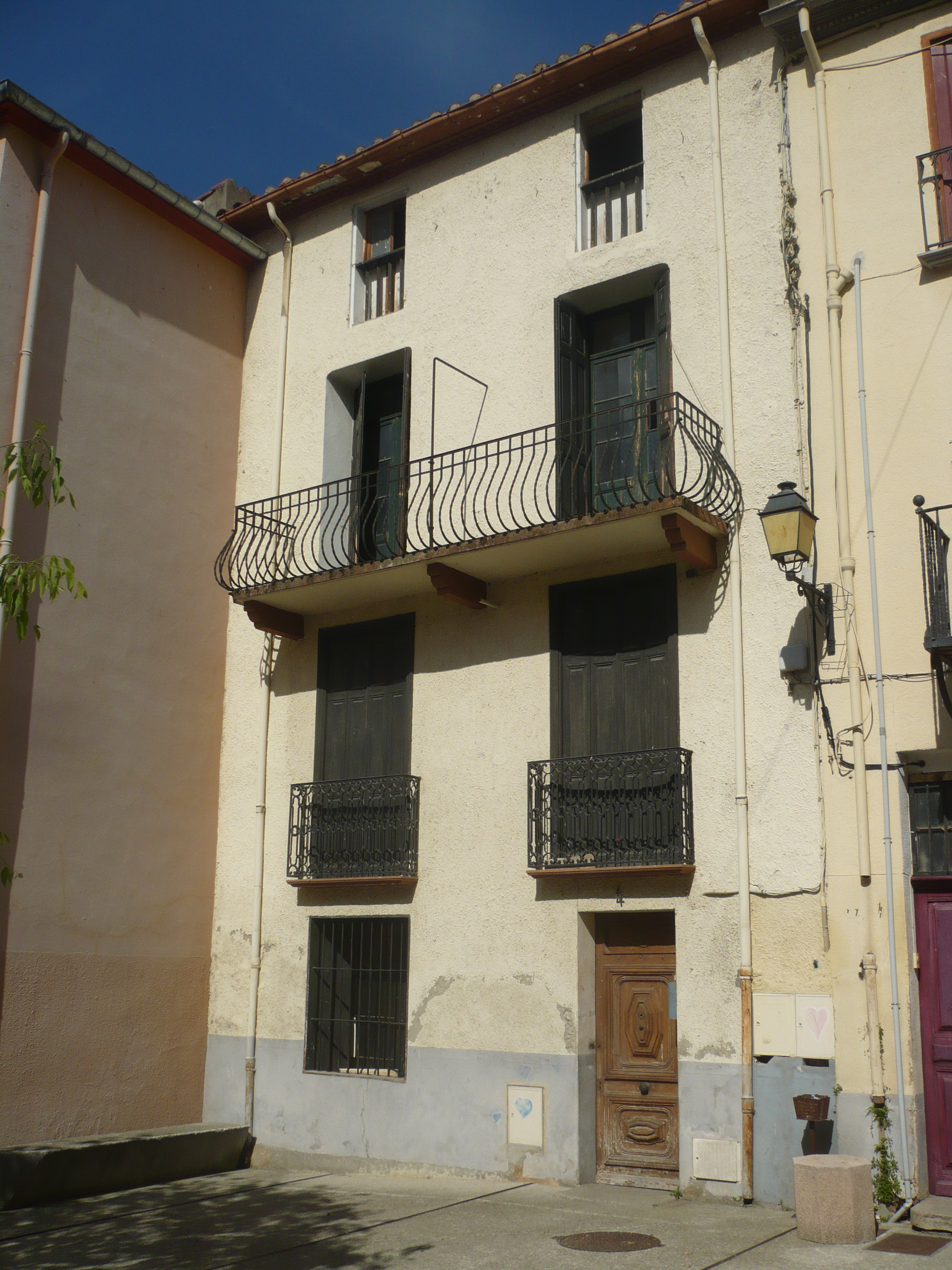
Today, the Saint-Étienne church is part of a house in the center of Arles-sur-Tech.

In 1603 or earlier, the parish of Sainte-Cécile was merged with that of Saint-Étienne d'Arles-sur-Tech. The parish priest of both parishes now resided in Arles-sur-Tech, and came to Cos only for funerals and Sunday mass, which was celebrated only irregularly. Parishioners sometimes turn to other, more accessible priests. This was particularly the case for the inhabitants of the village of Le Tech, who had a church nearby that was better served by the ecclesiastical authorities of the parish of Prats-de-Mollo. At the same time, the Arles abbey was weakening. The head of the Trescases family, who had settled at Mas de Cos, began selling land. He obtained the title of batlle. The direct consequences of this disaffection are a lack of maintenance of the building adjoining the church, which is gradually falling into ruin, and a gradual abandonment of the cemetery. For example, Cos' victims of the 1763 floods were buried in the Saint-Étienne parish cemetery.

In 1711, Jean-Pierre Trescases, a descendant of Joanoto, declared in his will that he wished to be buried in the church of Sainte-Cécile, which he referred to as the "tomb of his ancestors".

When the communes were created in 1790, neither the parish of Cos nor the village of Le Tech were deemed suitable for elevation to the rank of commune, due to a lack of inhabitants, despite their request. The whole area became part of Prats-de-Mollo.

After the French Revolution, the church of Sainte-Cécile was looted and burned by Spanish soldiers during the raids they carried out in the département after Napoleon's troops withdrew from Spain. The floor tiles were lifted, and the remains of the Trescases family desecrated. According to oral tradition, the bell was stolen and sold to a scrap dealer. Tradition has it that parishioners, having spotted the thief, intercepted him and ordered him to take the object of his misdeed back to the Tech. Although the anecdote is not attested to in historical texts, the Sainte-Cécile bell did indeed end up hanging in the church at Le Tech, from where it disappeared, swept away with the entire church by the catastrophic floods of 1940.

Le Tech was established as a parish in 1826, and was granted commune status in 1859. Its territory included the Coumelade river valley and the former parish of Sainte-Cécile. Michel Trescases, a direct descendant of Juanoto, great-grandson of the aforementioned Michel Trescases and owner of Cos, obtained this status. He was the first mayor of Le Tech, from 1862 until his death in 1909. He built a road lined with platanus trees between Cos and the village of Le Tech.

The building fell into disrepair and became overgrown. To limit the extent of the damage, the owners cleared the rubble and cleared the immediate vicinity of the church, including the interior, where trees had grown in the mid-1960s.

In 1984, Jean Ribes described the vaulting of the Sainte-Cécile church as "completely collapsed", whereas it was "still intact at the beginning of this century", and pointed out traces of fresco on the triumphal arch, as well as a staircase to the left of the entrance leading to a gallery. Only a section of wall remains from the apse. The last remnants of the starry sky painting on the triumphal arch disappeared before the year 2000.

In 1996 and 1997, partial restoration work was carried out under the direction of historian Pierre Ponsich. The work initially involved rebuilding the collapsed walls. The vaults were also rebuilt, in concrete for the nave and in stone for the apse.

== Architecture ==
Church plan: 1. Nave - 2. apse - 3. Baptismal font - 4. Porch.

The plan of Sainte-Cécile de Cos is typical of pre-Romanesque churches in the region: oriented east/west, the building comprises a simple, approximately rectangular nave, extended to the east by a flat, trapezoidal apse whose axis is slightly offset from that of the nave. A final pre-Romanesque feature is provided by the sparse, simply splayed windows and by the location of the only doorway in the south wall of the nave. The whole structure is barrel-vaulted. At the level of the separation between the nave and the apse are the remains of a bell-gable, which must once have had one or two bays.

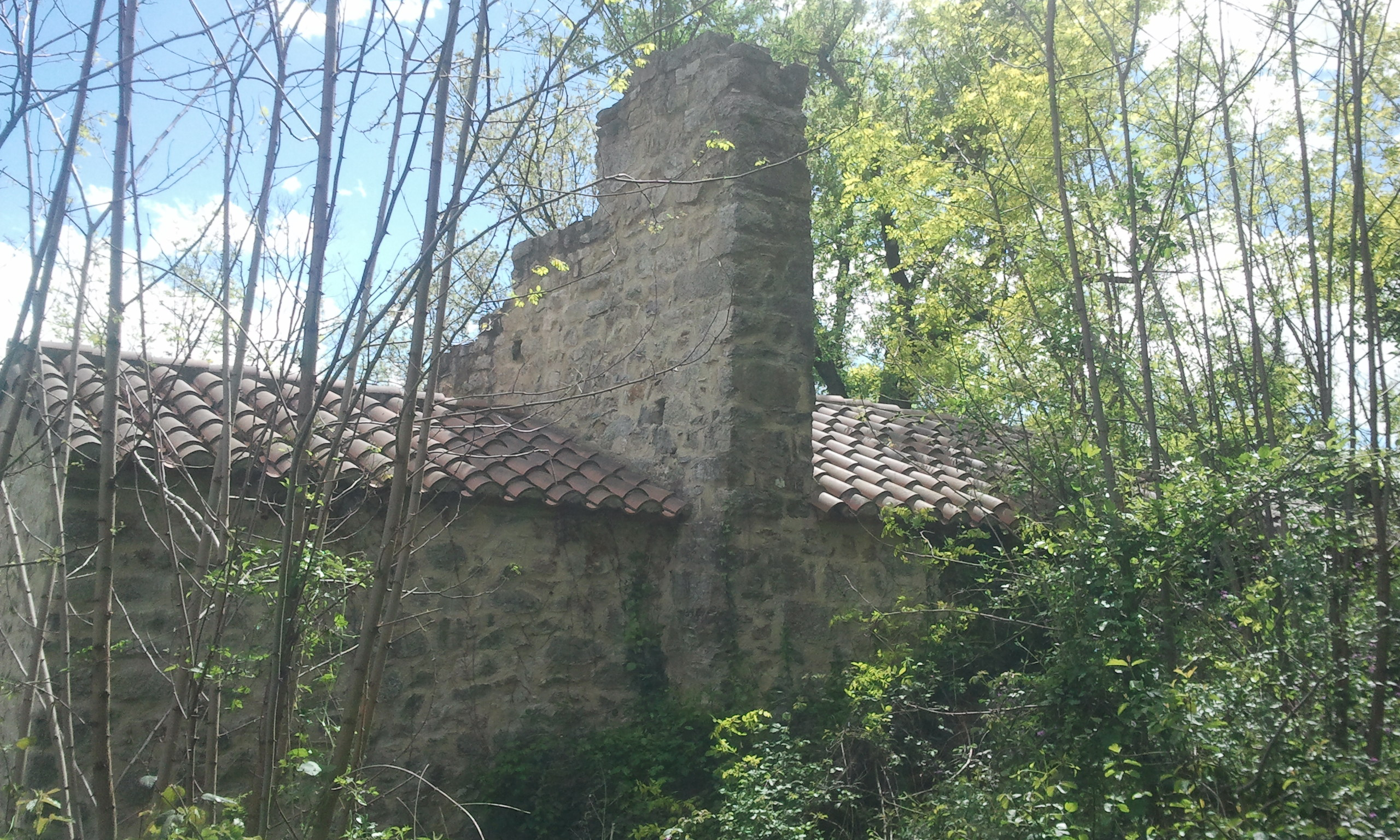
North facade and bell tower

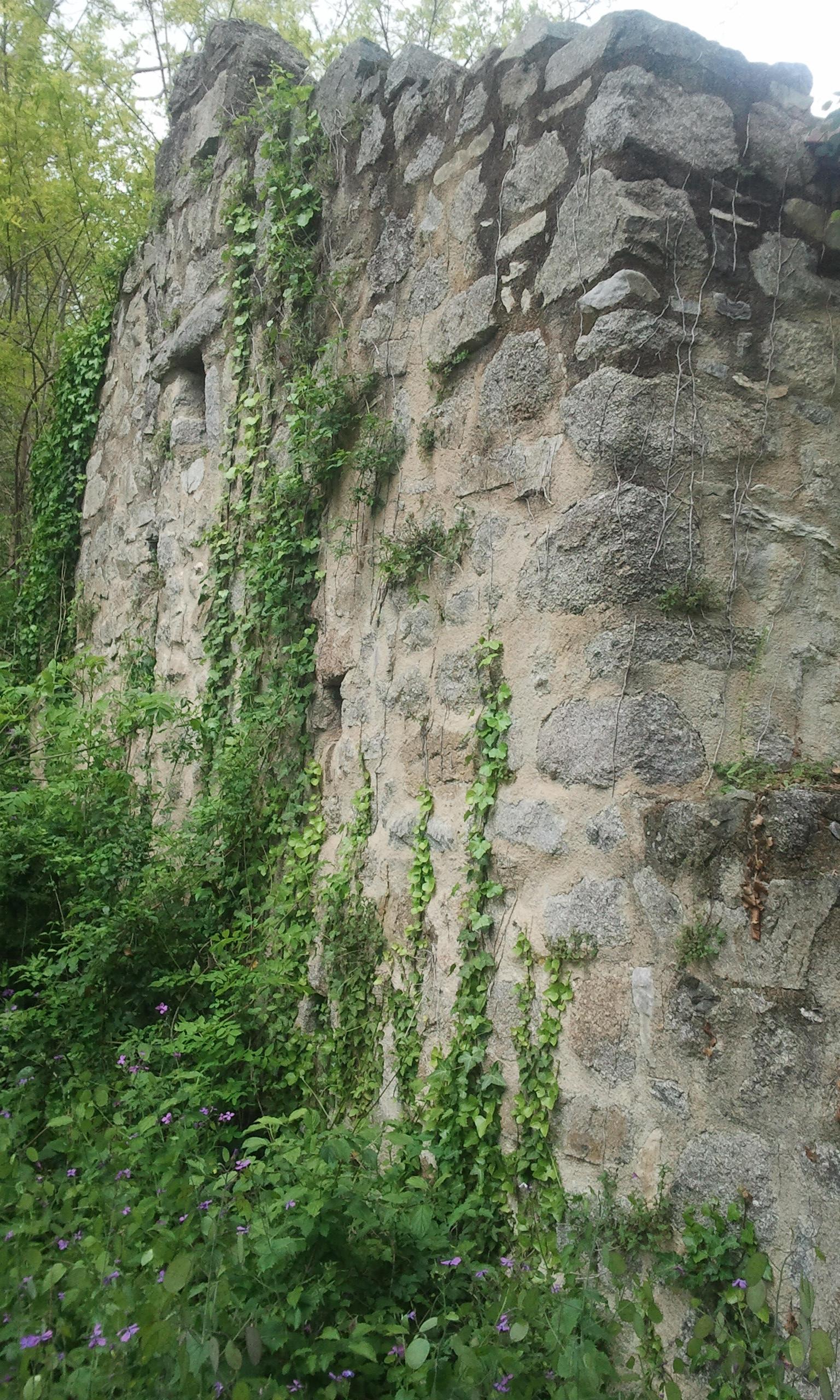
West facade

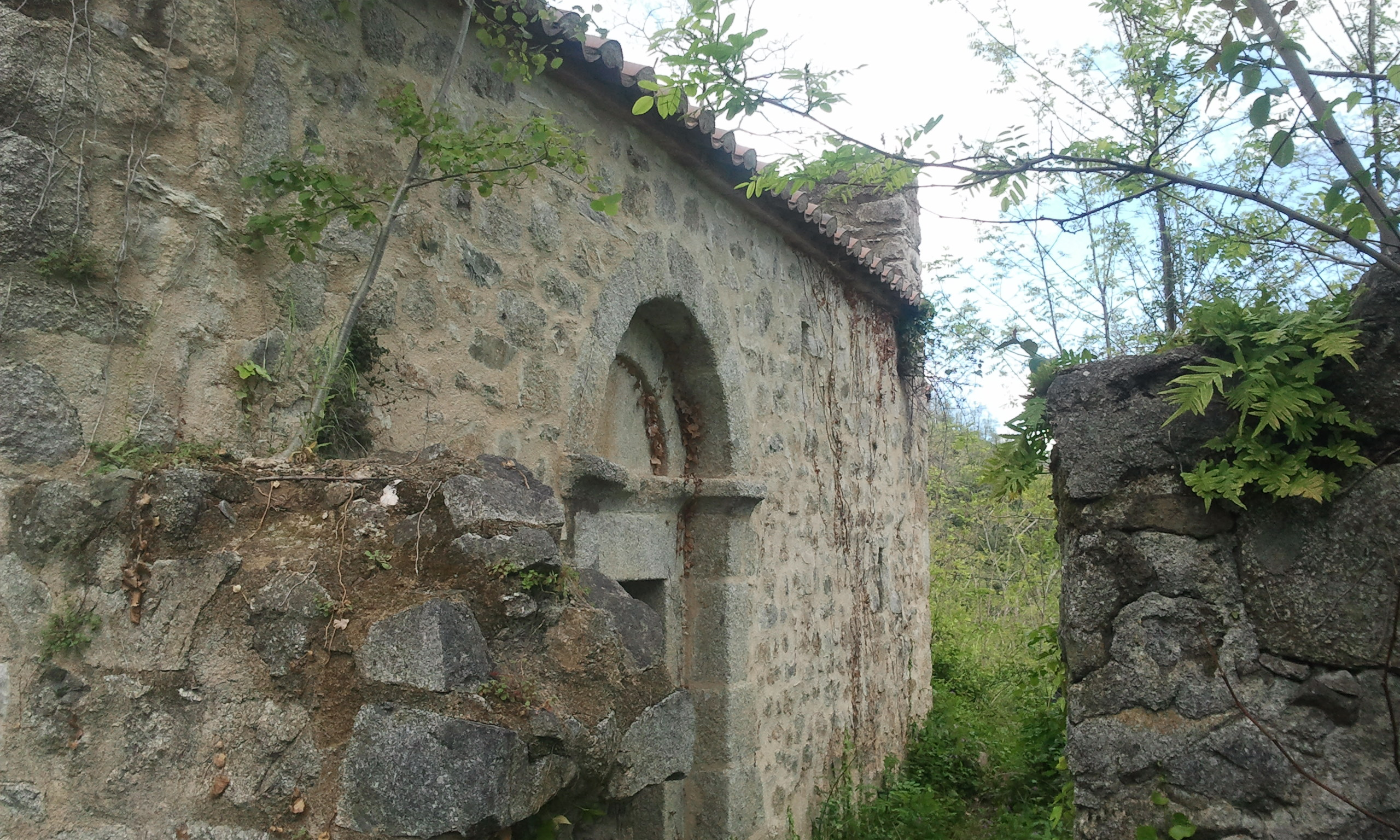
South facade

The nave is 8.70 m long and 5.80 m wide. The apse is a quadrilateral 4.50 m wide and 3.50 m deep. The stonework is made up of roughly hammered rubble stones bonded with abundant lime mortar, reinforced at the corners with larger, more precisely-cut stones. The walls are very thick. The irregularity of the masonry, which is more pronounced in the apse than in the nave, suggests an earlier construction. The stones used are of local origin, larger and more regular in the nave than in the apse. The north wall houses two rectangular niches.

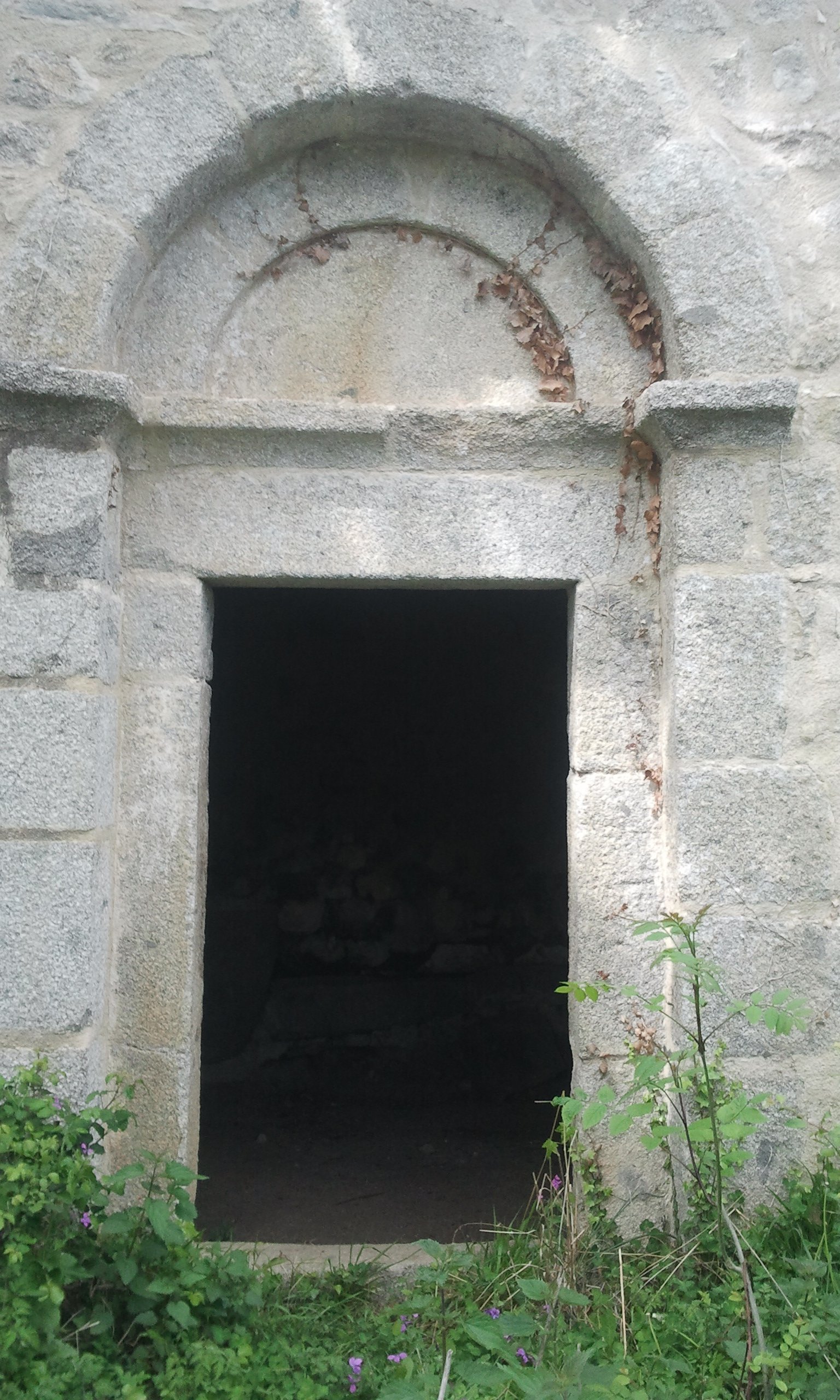
The portal

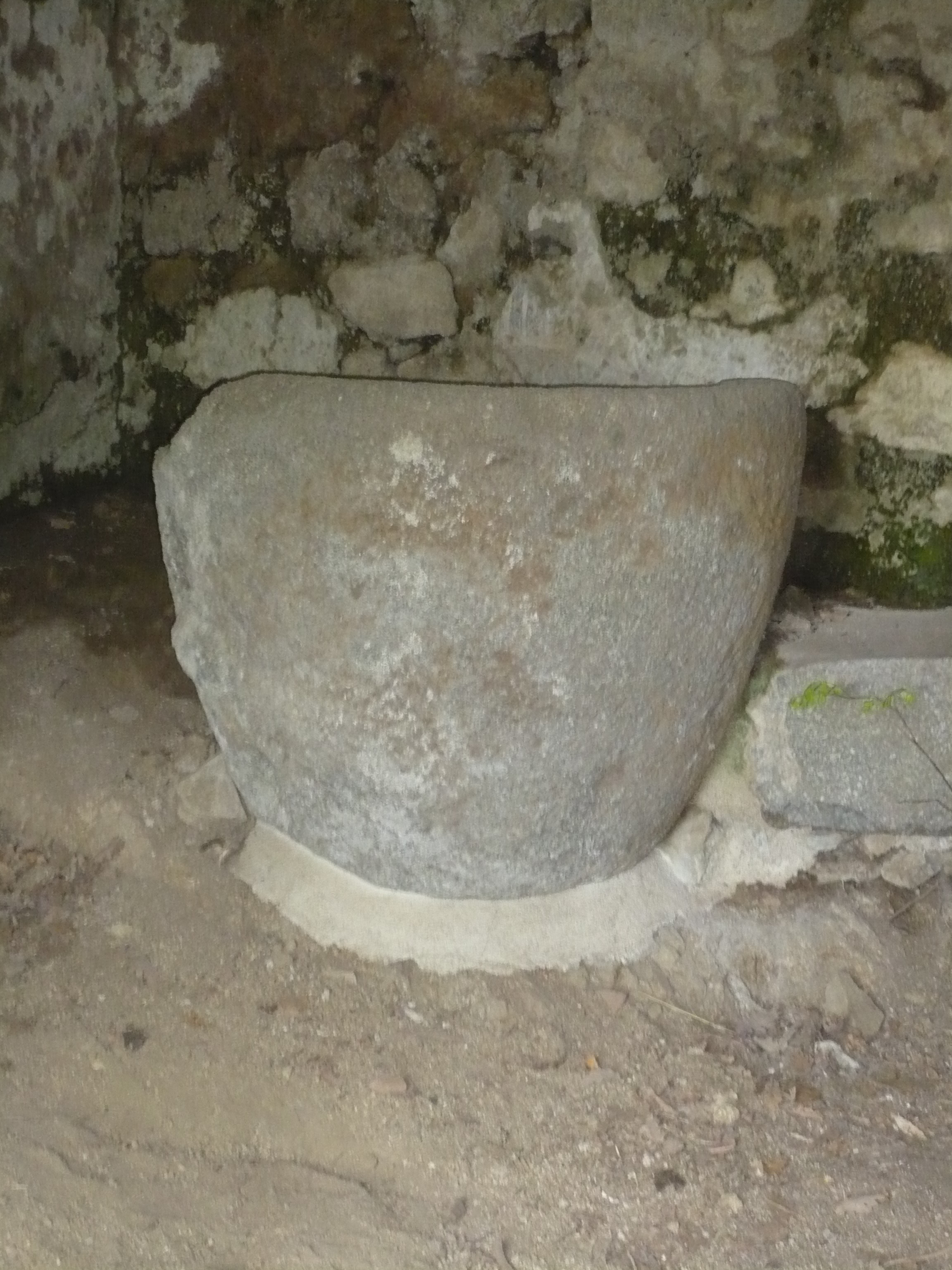
The baptismal font

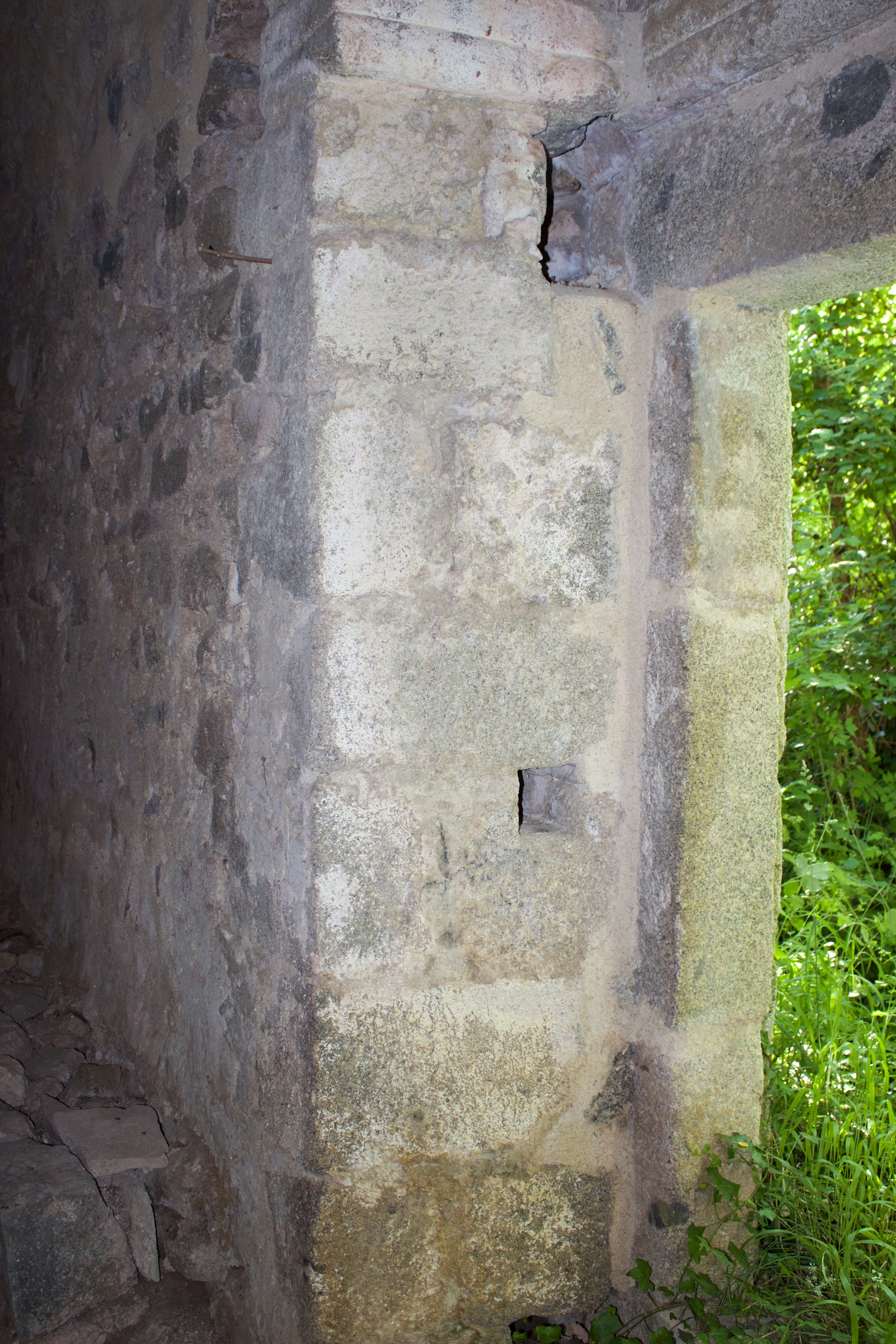
Wall construction at portal level

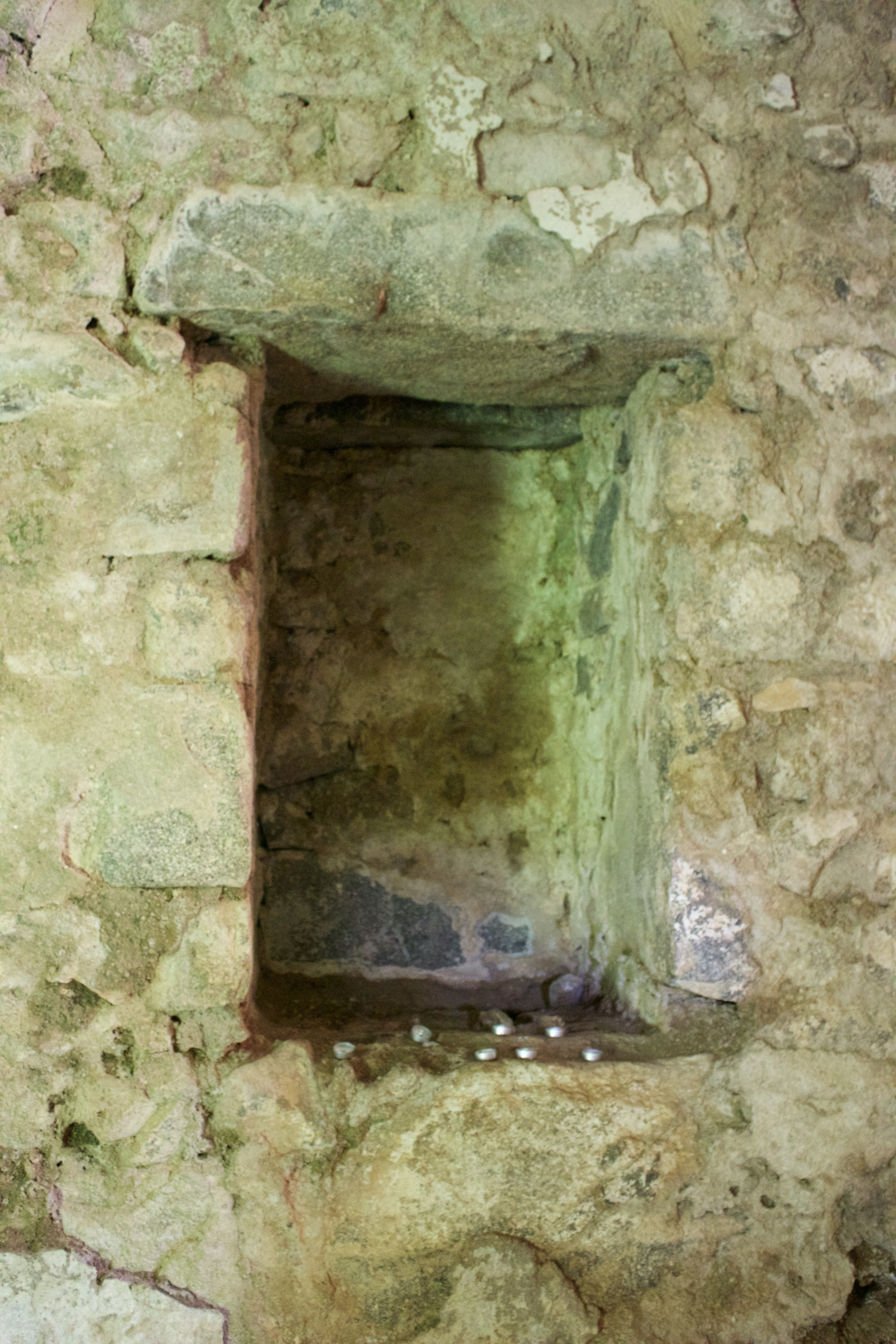
The niche near the apse

Inside, the south and north walls are flanked by a stone bench. Two steps lead up to the apse, whose floor is higher than that of the nave. The two parts of the building are linked by a centring triumphal arch built of very fine stoneware, also bonded with abundant mortar, on which traces of the planks used to hold it together during construction remain. A well-worn, ovoid-shaped granite baptismal font may date from the Romanesque period.

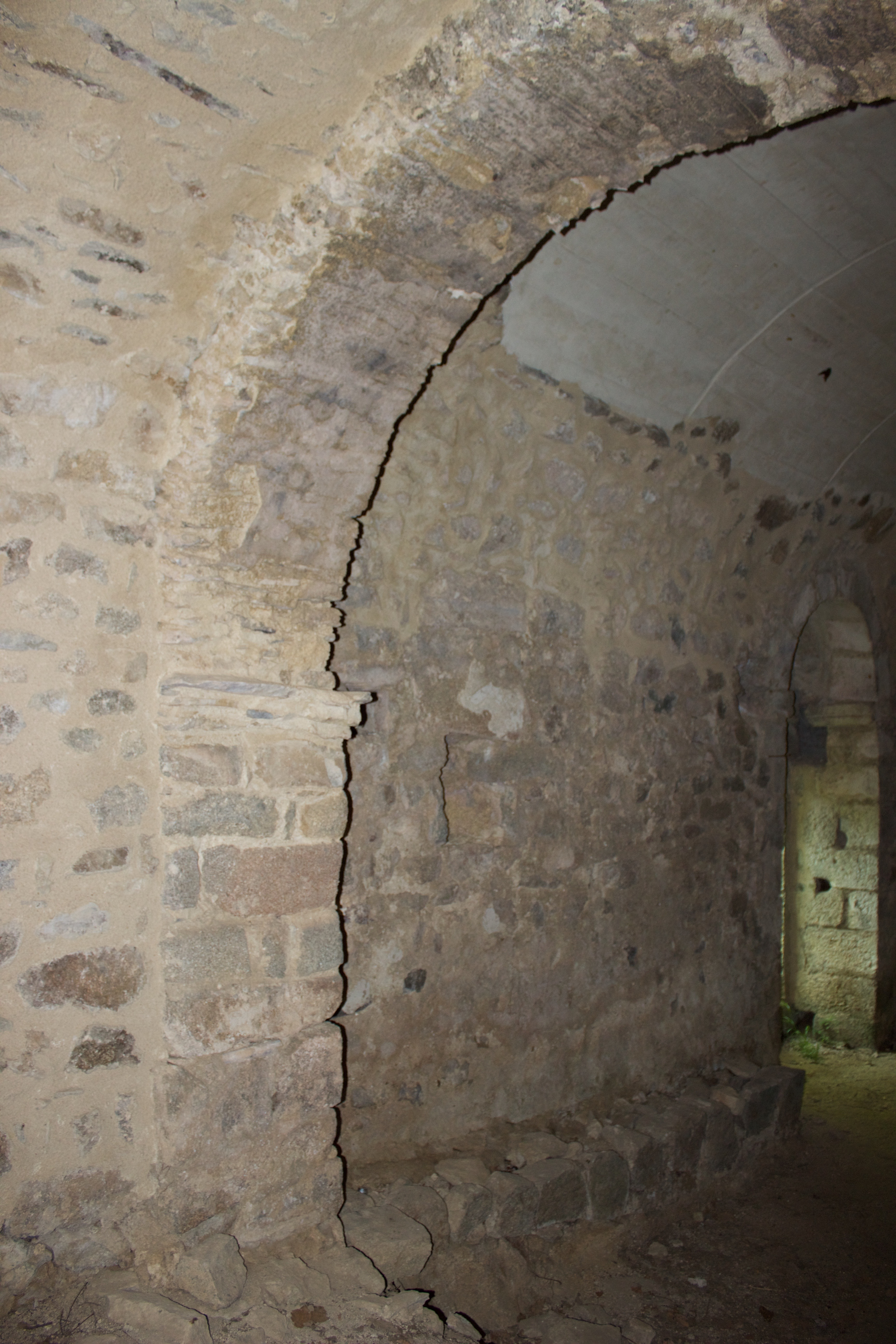
Southern part of the triumphal arch from the apse

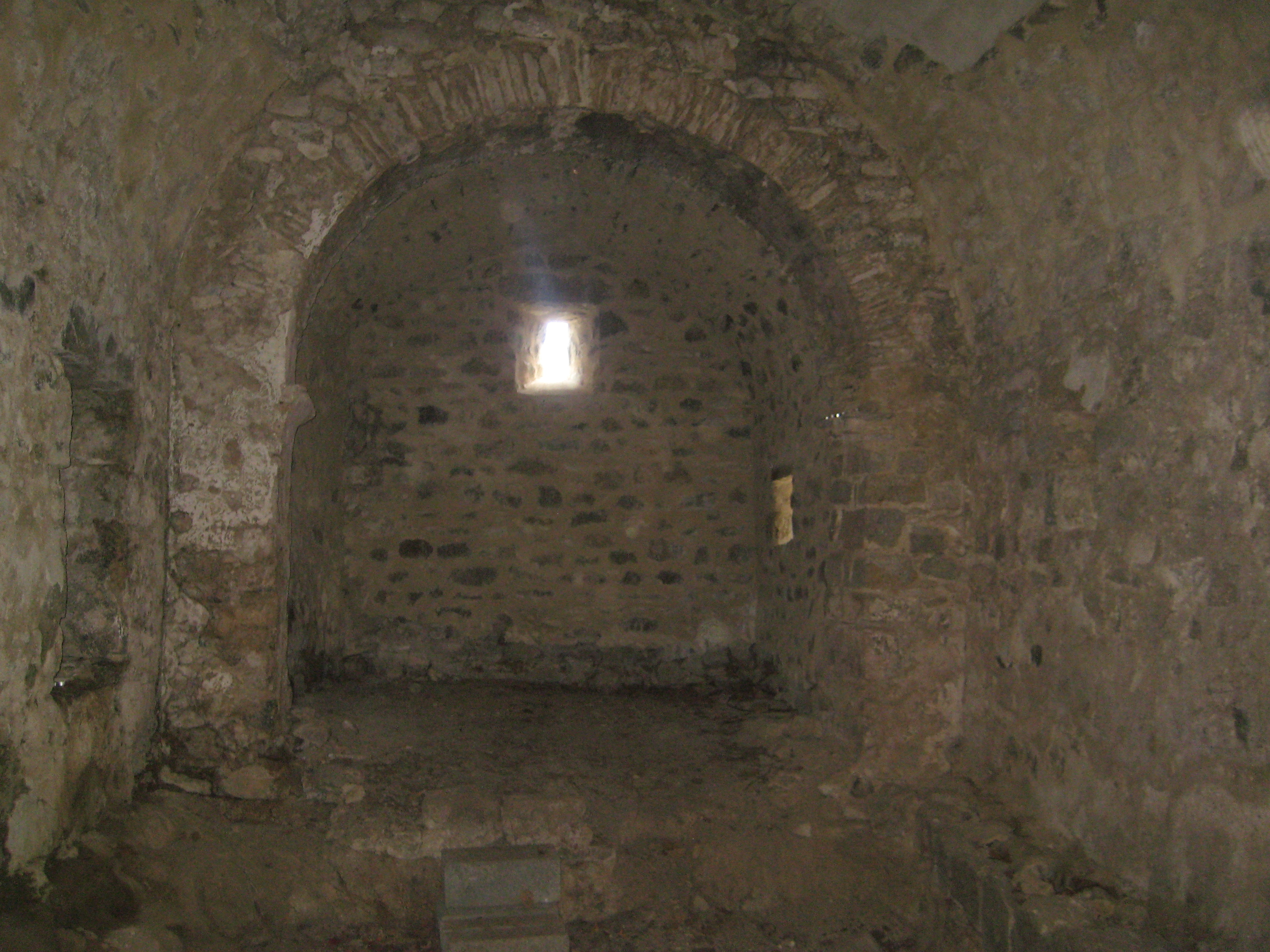
Interior view of the apse from the nave

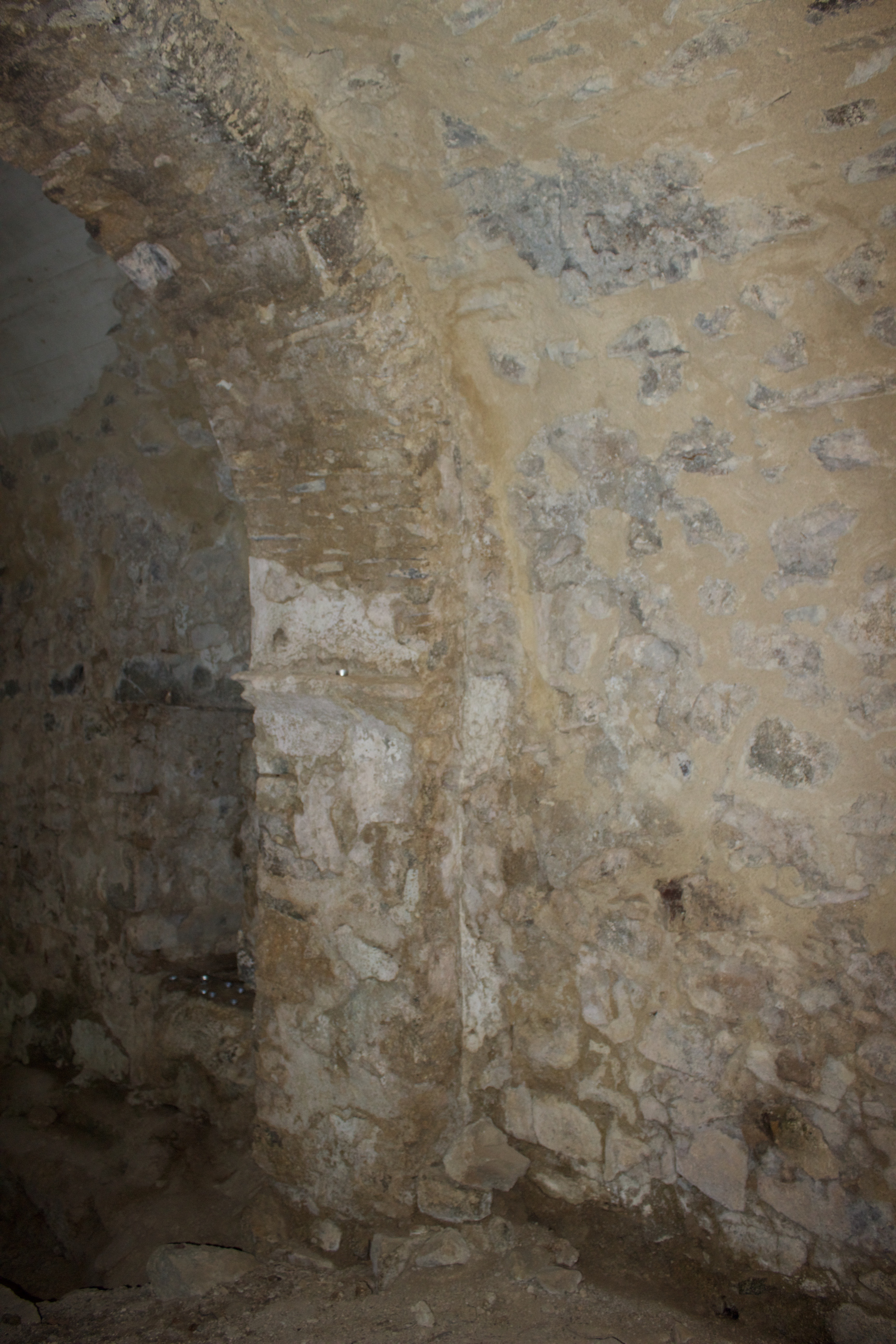
Northern part of the triumphal arch from the apse

== See also ==
- St Guillem of Combret Hermitage
- Saint Cecilia
- Abbey of Arles-sur-Tech

== Bibliography ==
- Basseda, Lluís (1990). "Toponymie historique de Catalunya Nord". Revista Terra Nostra. 1.
- Catafau, Aymat (1998). Les Celleres et la naissance du village en Roussillon. Perpignan: Presses Universitaires de Perpignan. ISBN 2-905828-97-8.
- Carrière, Laurence (2000–2001). "Deux chapelles du haut-Vallespir inscrites dans la tradition préromane: Saint-Guillem de Combret et Sainte-Cécile de Cos". Études roussillonnaises (XVIII): 107–116.
- Gibrat, Joseph (1916). La paroisse de Sainte-Cécile de Cos. Perpignan: Barrière et Cie. p. 38.
- Gineste, Roger (1993). Le Tech, Haut Vallespir: La mémoire d'un village, mille ans d'histoire. Perpignan: du Castillet.
- Mallet, Géraldine (2003). Églises romanes oubliées du Roussillon. Montpellier: Les Presses du Languedoc. ISBN 978-2-8599-8244-7.
- Martinez, Catherine; Rossignol, Nicole (1975). "Le peuplement du Roussillon, du Conflent et du Vallespir aux ixe et xe siècles". Annales du Midi: Revue archéologique, historique et philologique de la France méridionale. 87 (122): 139–156. doi:10.3406/anami.1975.1595.
- Ribes, Jean (1984). Haut et moyen Vallespir au fil du temps: Antiques paroisses et ermitages, mille ans de ferveur populaire. Perpignan: Éditions du Castillet.
- Sagnes, Jean (1985). Le pays catalan. Société nouvelle d'éditions régionales. pp. 579–1133. ISBN 2904610014.
- Vivier, Julie; Lapique, Sylvain (2011). Guide des Pyrénées romanes. Toulouse: Éditions Privat. ISBN 978-2-7089-6902-5.

=== In Catalan ===
- "Canigó". Gran Enciclopèdia Catalana. Barcelone: Edicions 62.
- "cel·la". Gran Enciclopèdia Catalana. Barcelone: Edicions 62.
- "Coç". Gran Enciclopèdia Catalana. Barcelone: Edicions 62.
- d'Abadal i de Vinyals, Ramon (1950). "Catalunya carolingia". eLS Diplomes Carolingis a Catalunya (Primera Part). 2. Barcelone: Institut d'Estudis catalans.
- "Santa Cecília de Coç". Catalunya romànica: El Vallespir. El Capcir. El Donasà. La Fenolleda. Fundació Enciclopèdia Catalana. 1996.

=== Further reading ===
- Église Sainte-Cécile de Cos
