= St Guillem of Combret Hermitage =

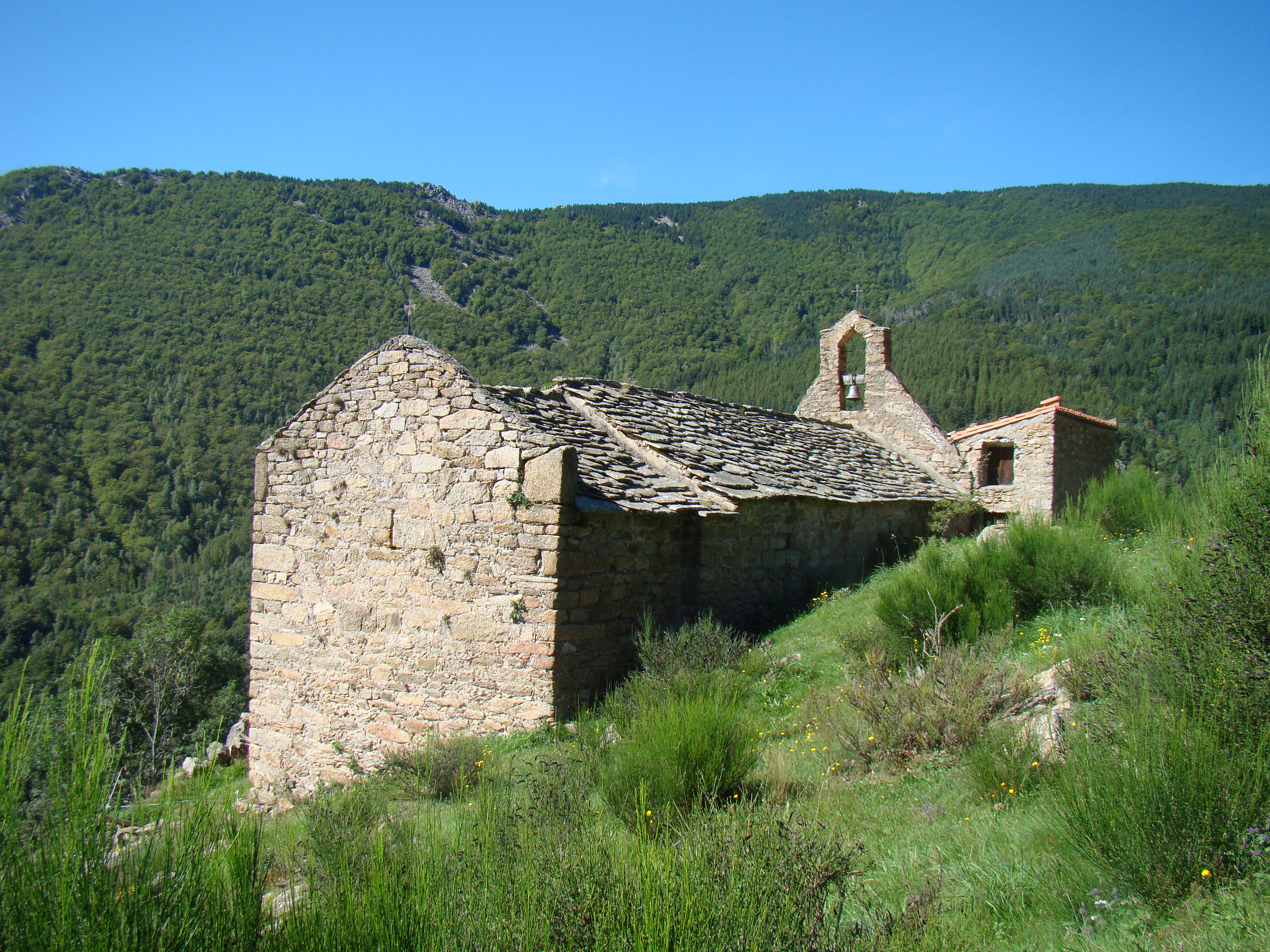

The St Guilhem of Combret Hermitage is a small rural romanesque chapel located on the southern flank of the Canigou massif, in the French department of Pyrenees-Orientales, and the Languedoc-Roussillon region. It lies midway between the villages of Prats-de-Mollo, seat of the parish to which the chapel belongs, and Le Tech, capital of the municipality.

According to legend, the chapel was built by a hermit named Guillem, who settled there in the early Middle Ages after defeating evil spirits that had haunted him. The Romanesque construction dates from the 11th century, and was based on a somewhat older building. The chapel is a listed building, as are various objects (including a rare wrought iron bell) associated with it. Two medieval manuscripts addressed to the priests officiating at the church also survive.

The hermitage has been a place of welcome and for the rest of travelers for over a thousand years. The site includes a refuge, rebuilt in 2014, for the several hiking trails which pass nearby. Although the chapel has not been home to any hermits since 1840, it still becomes a place of meditation twice a year, during traditional Catalan religious festivities known as aplecs, celebrating St. Guillem and St. Mary Magdalene, to whom the hermitage was originally dedicated.

== Site ==
The Canigou massif is the easternmost ridge of the Pyrenées mountains and its altitude exceeds 2000m. Located in the French department of Pyrénées-Orientales, the massif separates the natural and historical areas of Vallespir to the south, and Conflent to the north.

The chapel is situated on the southern flank of the massif, at 1330 m above sea level on a hillock overlooking fifty meters of river bed Coumelade. The chapel belongs to the town of Le Tech, which is accessed by a paved road and then a dirt forest road; or on foot, by various marked hiking trails, the shortest of which measures three kilometers from La Llau, a journey which takes about one hour's walk. The hiking trails of the Vallespir Tour and the Canigou Tour also pass close to the hermitage. These trails are the old roads used by pilgrims coming from Prats-de-Mollo and Montferrer. The entire site is surrounded by Vallespir national forest.

The site which includes the Romanesque chapel is near a large housing estate, and a few meters downstream, there are several abandoned buildings and the hiking shelter. An iron cross is situated upstream and further up, near the hiking trails, a picnic area has been created. The church is privately owned.

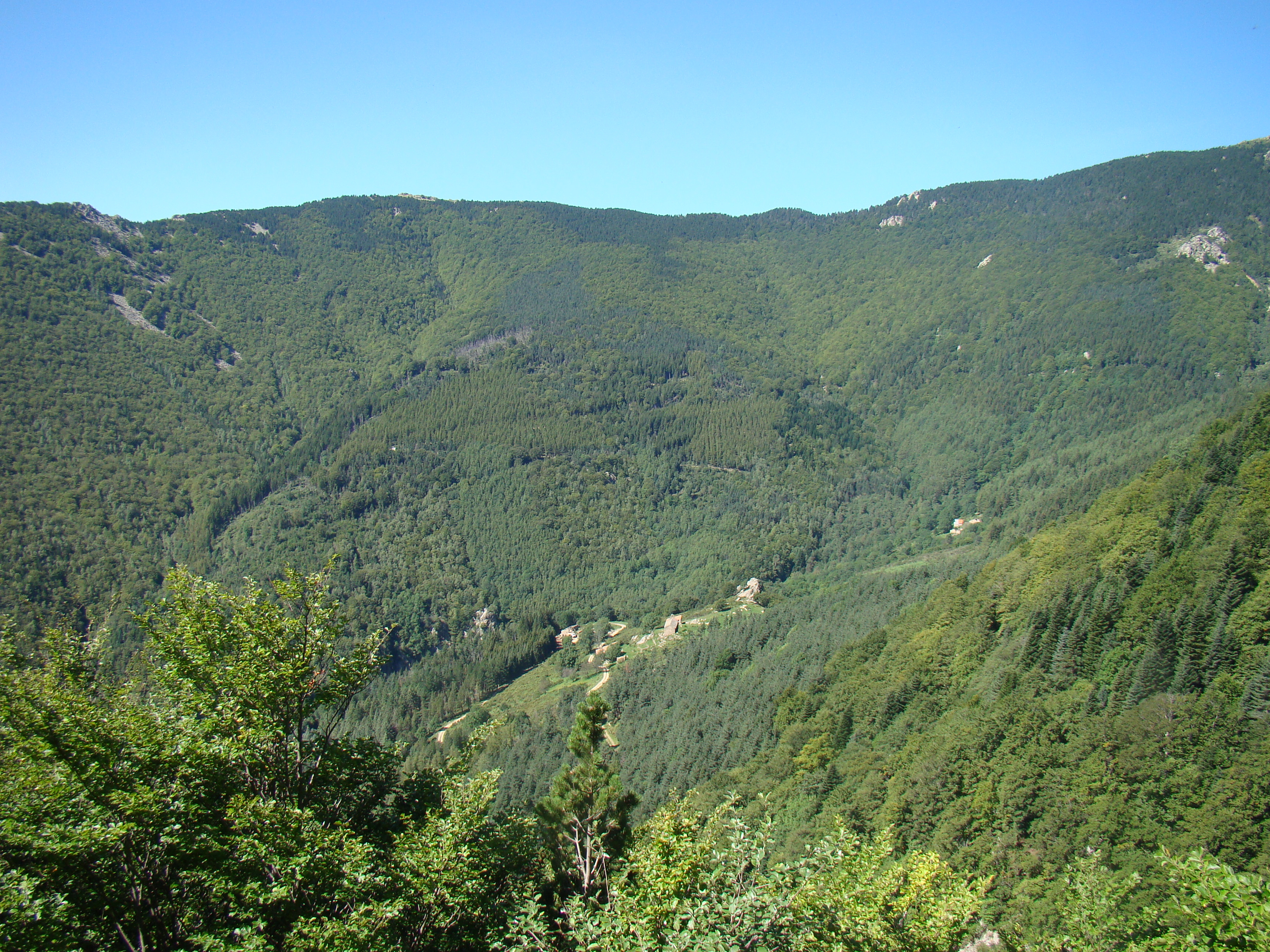
The Hermitage site

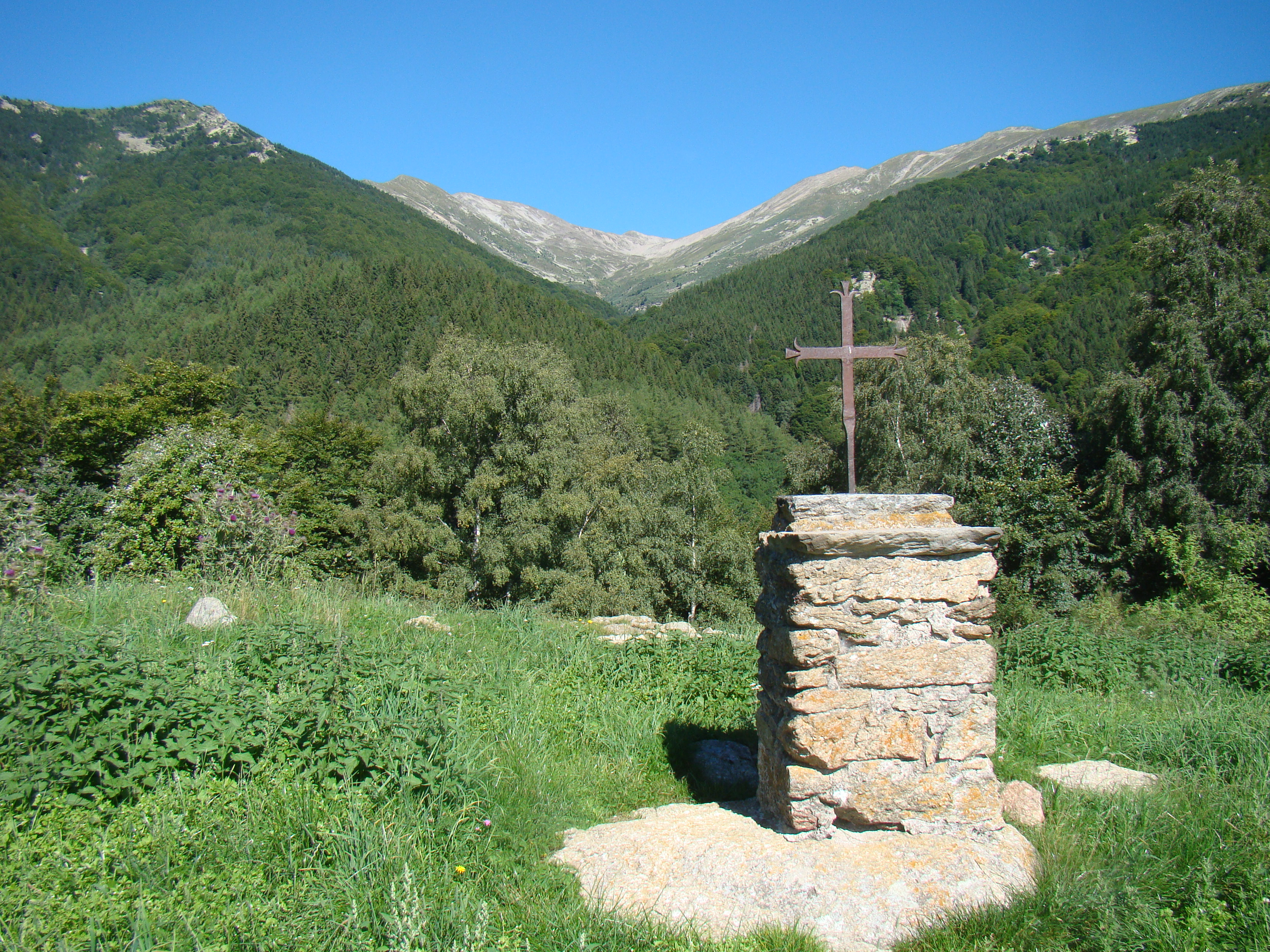
Iron Cross overlooking the upper valley of the Coumelade

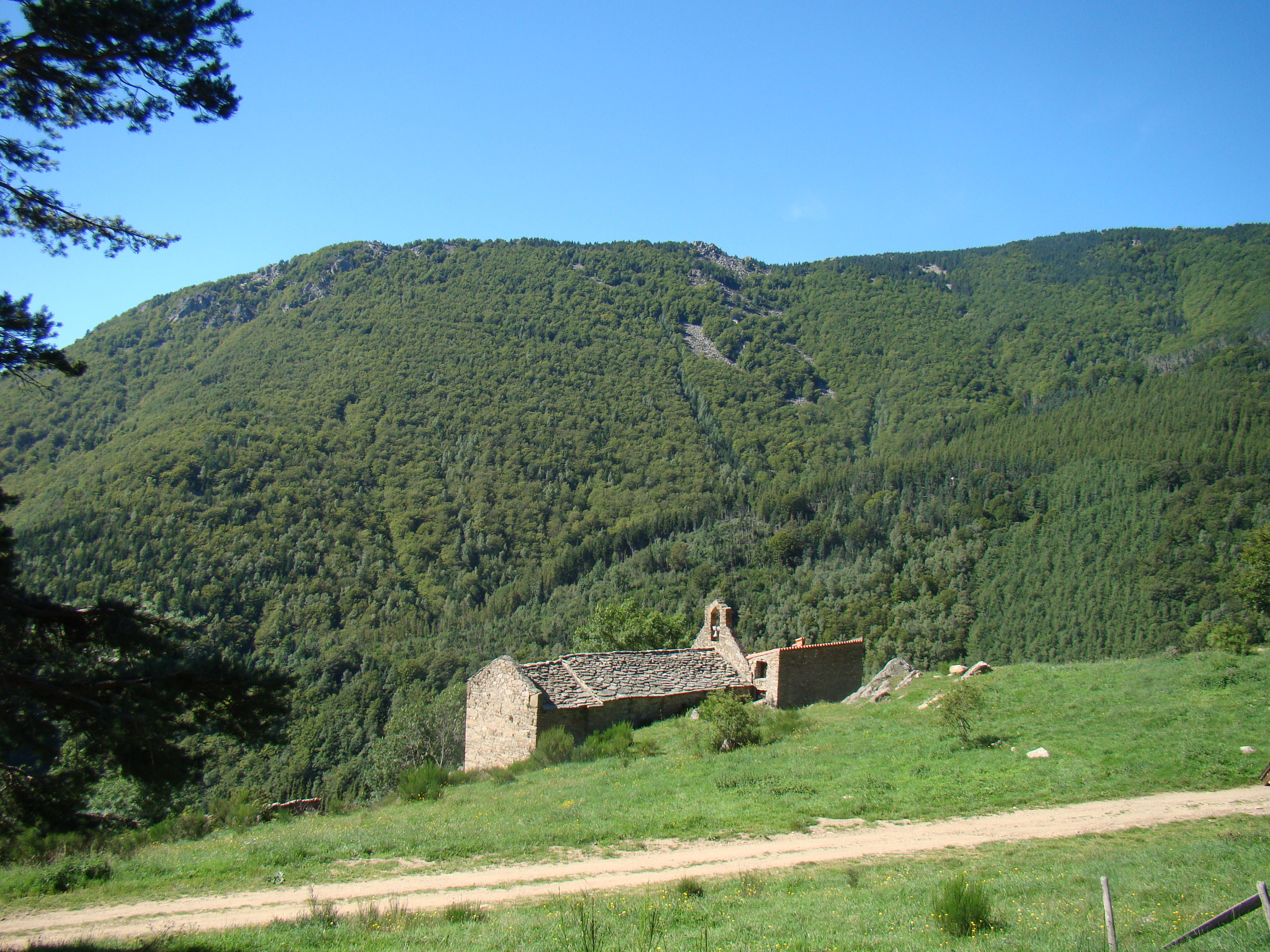
The chapel in its surrounds

== See also ==
Church of Saint Cecilia in Cos

== Bibliography ==
- Mallet, Géraldine (2003). Églises romanes oubliées du Roussillon (in French). Montpellier: Les Presses du Languedoc. ISBN 978-2-8599-8244-7.
