= Le Tech =

Le Tech El Tec
- Commune
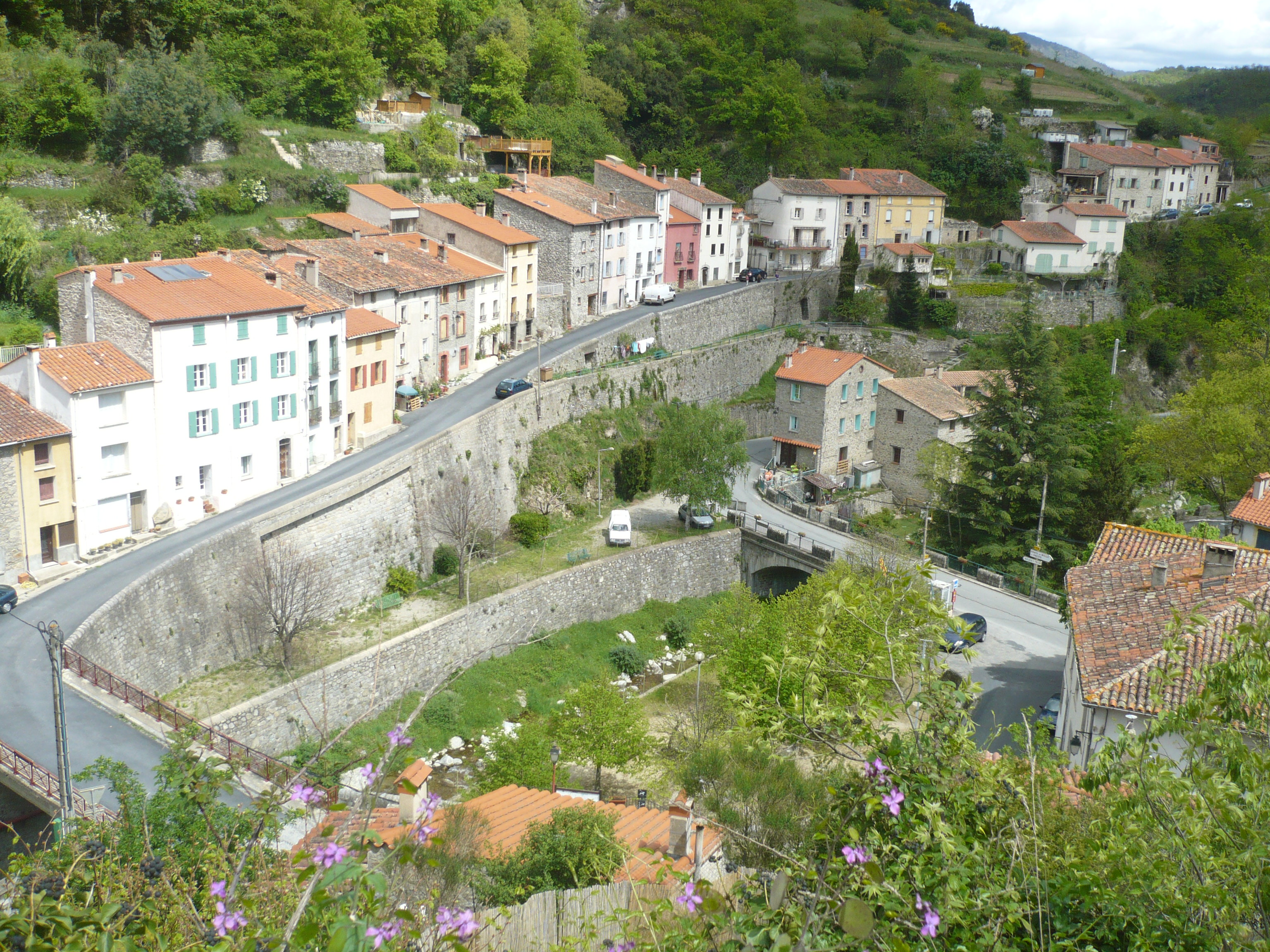
- An overall view of Le Tech
- Location of Le Tech
- Location within France Location within Occitanie
- Coordinates: 42°24′41″N 2°32′42″E
- Country: France
- Region: Occitania
- Department: Pyrénées-Orientales
- Arrondissement: Céret
- Canton: Le Canigou
- Intercommunality: Haut Vallespir

Government
  - Mayor (2020–2026): Guillaume Cervantes
- Area^{1}: 25.18 km^{2} (9.72 sq mi)
- Elevation: 520 m (1,710 ft)
- Highest elevation: 2,721 m (8,927 ft)
- Lowest elevation: 420 m (1,380 ft)
- Population (2023): 95
  - Density: 3.8/km^{2} (9.8/sq mi)
- Time zone: UTC+01:00 (CET)
  - Summer (DST): UTC+02:00 (CEST)
- INSEE/Postal code: 66206 /66230
- ^{1} French Land Register data, which excludes lakes, ponds, glaciers > 1 km^{2} (0.386 sq mi or 247 acres) and river estuaries.

Le Tech (French pronunciation: [lə tɛk]; Catalan: El Tec) is a commune in the Pyrénées-Orientales department in southern France. It is part of the historical Vallespir comarca.

== Geography ==
=== Localisation ===
Le Tech is located east of Prats-de-Mollo-la-Preste, in the canton of Le Canigou and in the arrondissement of Céret.

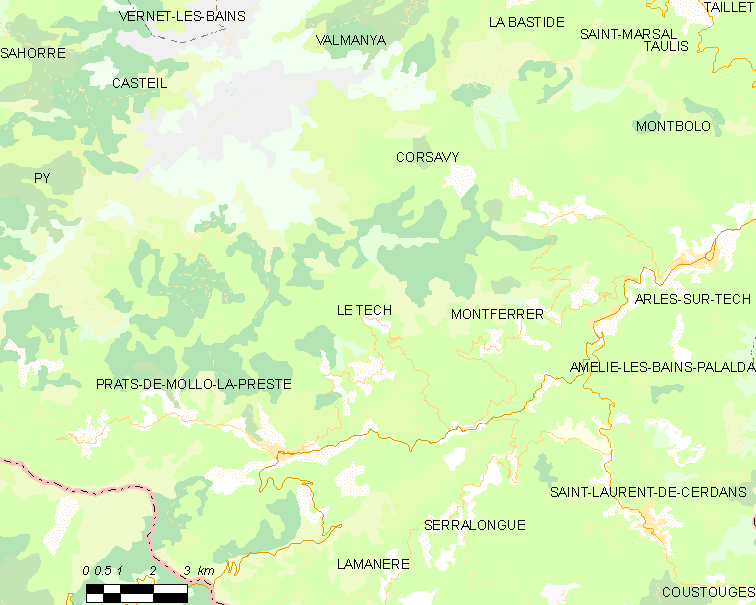
Map of Le Tech and its surrounding communes

=== Land relief ===
Elevation ranges from 420 to 2721 meters.

=== Hydrography ===
The territory of Le Tech is shaped by the valley of the river Coumelade and the village itself is located at the confluence of the Coumelade and the river Tech.

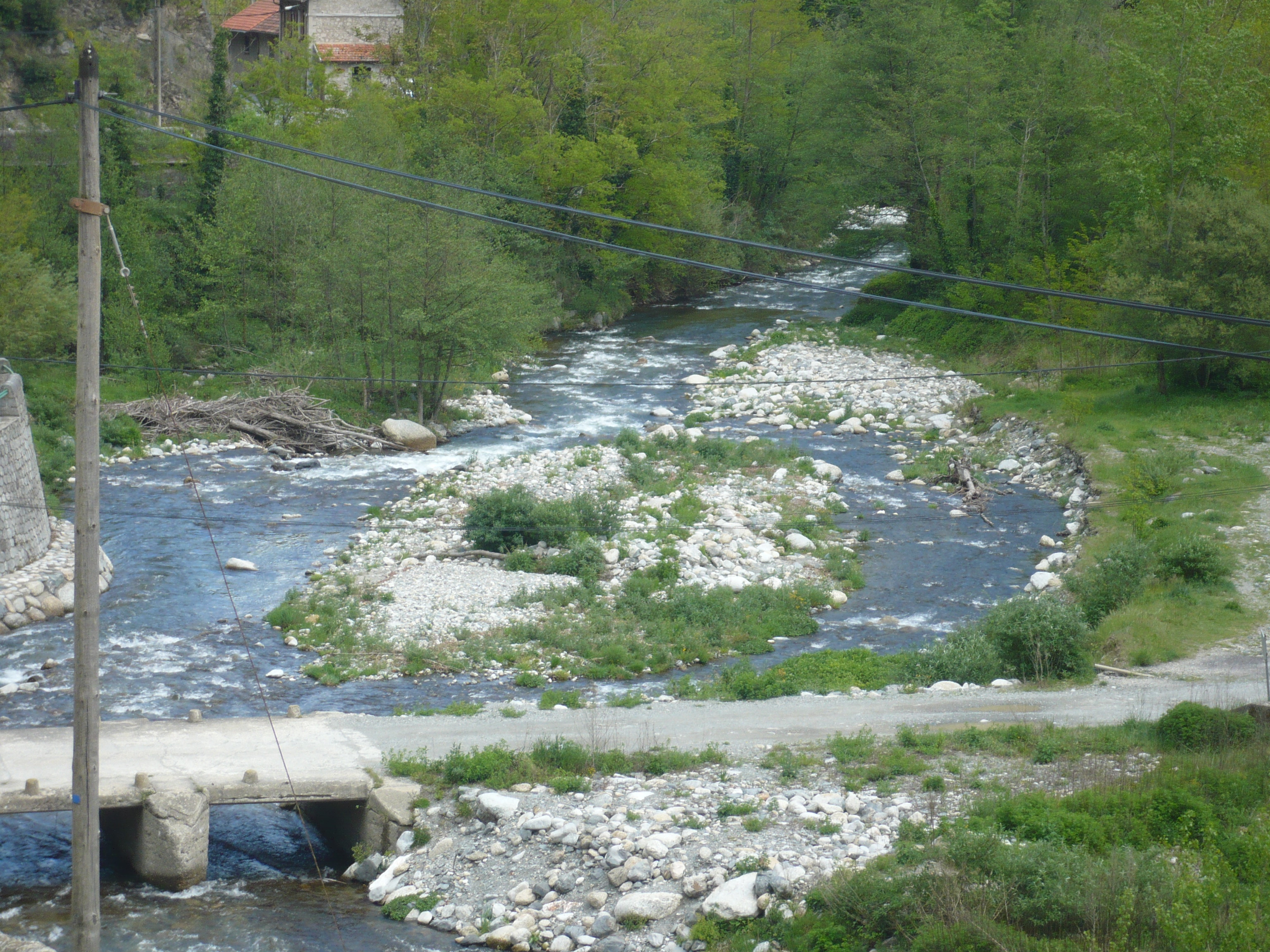
Confluence of the Coumelade and the Tech

== Toponymy ==
Le Tech takes its name from the Tech river which runs through the village.

== History ==
The commune of Le Tech was created on March 19, 1862, by a piece of territory being separated from Prats-de-Mollo.

== Government and politics ==
=== Mayors ===
Mayor	Term start	Term end
Jean-Michel Coste	1971	1980
Raphaël Sales	1980	1989
Roger Gineste	1989	?
Claude Puitg	2001	2008
Guillaume Cervantes	2008	

== Population ==
Historical population

Year	Pop.	±% p.a.
1866	554	—
1872	521	−1.02%
1876	543	+1.04%
1881	498	−1.72%
1886	508	+0.40%
1891	450	−2.40%
1896	458	+0.35%
1901	470	+0.52%
1906	557	+3.45%
1911	512	−1.67%
1921	439	−1.53%
1926	449	+0.45%
1931	410	−1.80%

Year	Pop.	±% p.a.
1936	370	−2.03%
1946	249	−3.88%
1954	252	+0.15%
1962	218	−1.80%
1968	152	−5.83%
1975	126	−2.64%
1982	124	−0.23%
1990	124	+0.00%
1999	84	−4.24%
2007	86	+0.29%
2012	103	+3.67%
2017	95	−1.60%
2023	95	+0.00%

Source: EHESS and INSEE

== Sites of interest ==
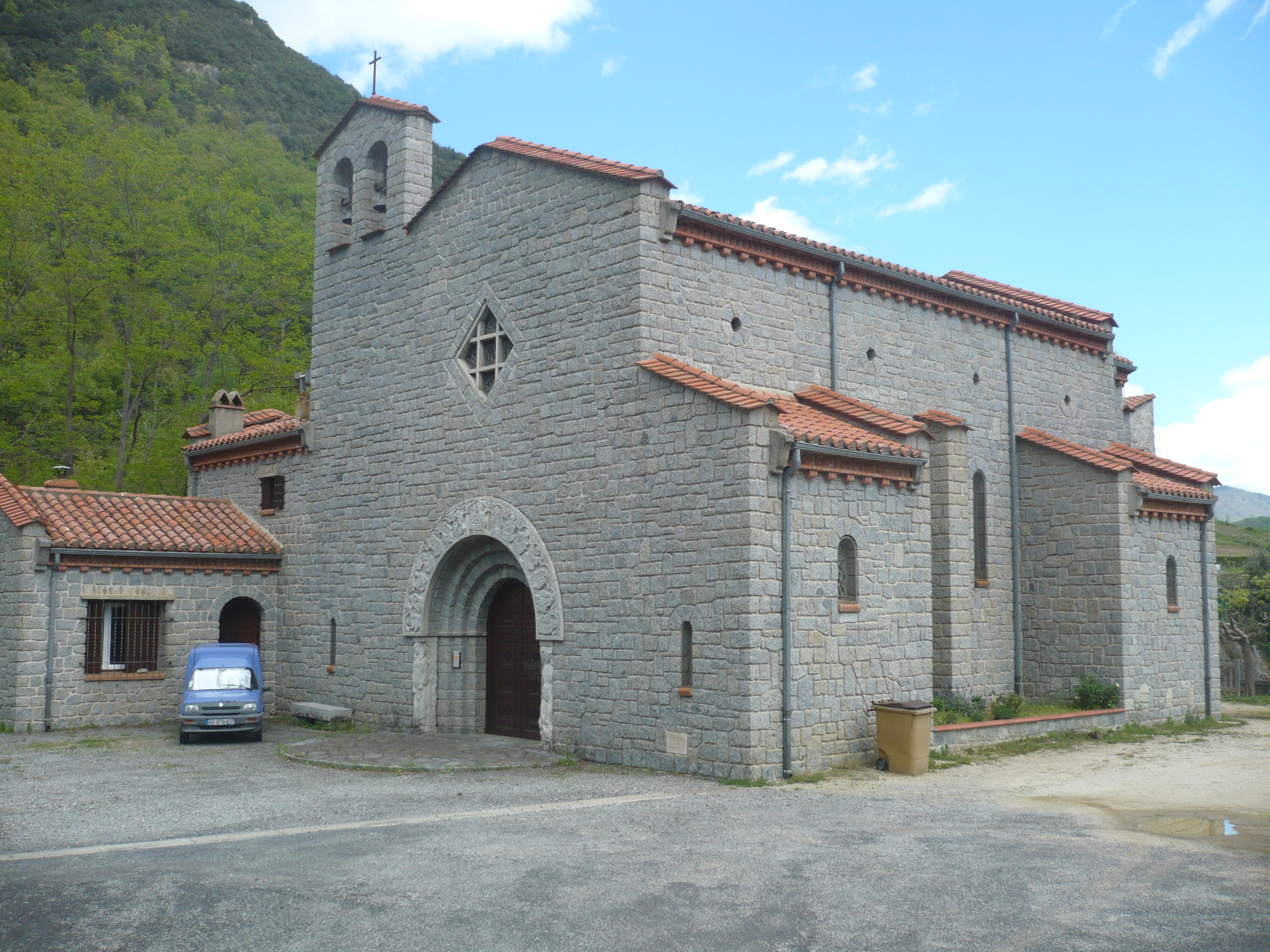
The new Saint Mary church

- Saint Mary church : the ancient church from the 17th c., located near the river, was destroyed by floods in 1940 and a new one was then built above the village.
- St Guillem of Combret Hermitage
- Sainte Cécile de Cos church
- Cos tower
- Saint Côme et Saint-Damien de La Llau church

== See also ==
- Communes of the Pyrénées-Orientales department
