= Aplec =

Aplec was a Catalan magazine from which there is only published one number from April 1952. It was edited by “Club de Divulgació Literària” (a literary club) and it was printed in “Gràfiques Marina, S.A.”. The editing office was in Joseó Antonio Street, 218. Regarding its format, it had a measurement of 270x215 mm. The number cost 7 pesetas.

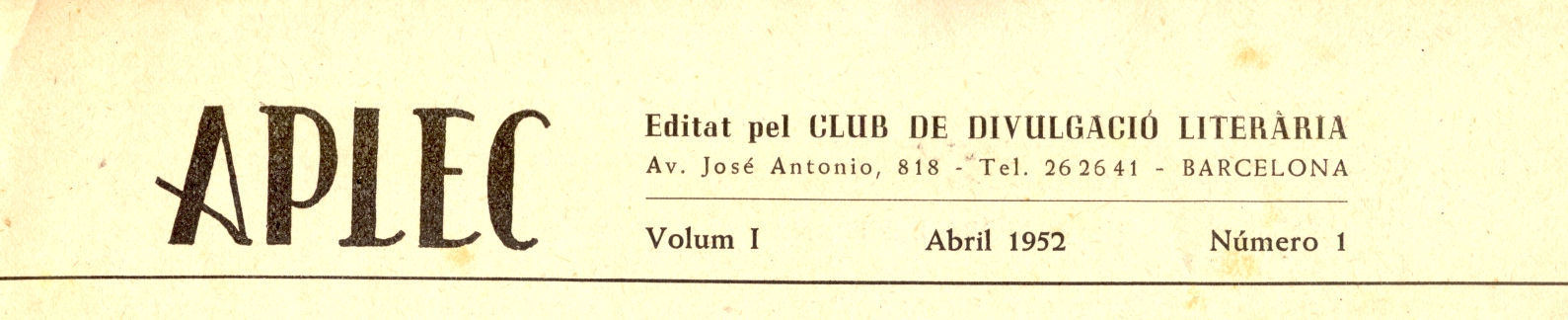
Aplec - capçalera

It was a literary magazine, really well illustrated. It contained collaborations from J.Mettra, Octavi Saltor, Aurora Bertrana, Salvador Espriu, Maria Aurèlia Capmany, P. Prat i Ubach, Josep Gudiol, Rosa Ricart and Josep Iglésies.
