= Abbey of Arles-sur-Tech =

Abbey in Pyrénées-Orientales, France

Coordinates: 42°27′20.3″N 2°38′6″E

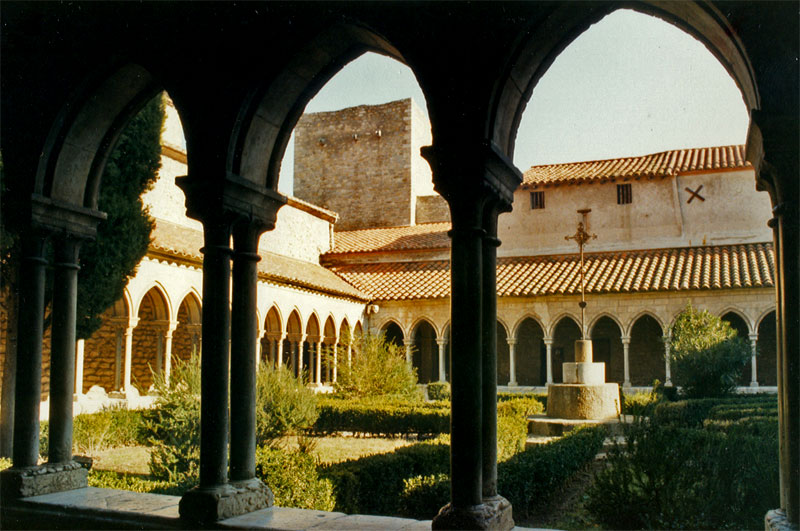
14th-century cloisters of Sainte-Marie d'Arles

The abbey of Saint Mary of Arles-sur-Tech (Catalan: Santa Maria d'Arles; French: Sainte-Marie d'Arles-sur-Tech, Notre-Dame d'Arles-sur-Tech) was a Benedictine monastery in Arles-sur-Tech in the Vallespir between the ninth century and the eighteenth. It was dedicated to Mary, mother of Jesus, and belonged to the diocese of Perpignan.

The abbey was in existence by the early ninth century. As the "monastery of Vallespir", it is listed in the Notice of the Service of the Monasteries, compiled in 819 for Emperor Louis the Pious. It is placed in the province of Septimania and is recorded as owing prayers for the imperial family, but not military service or taxes.

The independent existence of the monastery came to an end in 1592. At the request of King Philip II of Spain, the abbey of Arles-sur-Tech was united with the abbey of Saint-André-de-Sorède by a bull of Pope Clement VIII dated 13 August 1592. At that time the abbey of Sorède had no monks and Arles had only eight. At the start of the French Revolution in 1789, the united monastery had only six monks. The building was spared destruction and expropriation, but the abbey was dissolved and the building became the parish church.

== Bibliography ==
- Devic, Claude; Vaissète, Joseph; Roschach, Ernest, eds. (1872). Histoire générale de Languedoc. Vol. 4. Édouard Privat.
- Lesne, Émile (1920). "Les ordonnances monastiques de Louis le Pieux et la Notitia de servitio monasteriorum". Revue d'histoire de l'église de France. 6 (31): –161–175, 321–338 and 449–493. doi:10.3406/rhef.1920.2144.
- Mallet, Géraldine (2003). Églises romanes oubliées du Roussillon. Presses du Languedoc.
