= Ferdinand Fabre =

French writer and poet (1827–1898)

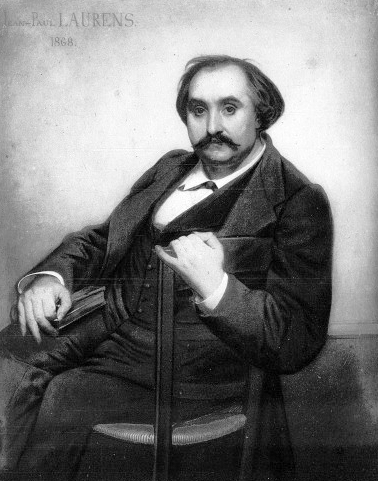
Ferdinand Fabre Portrait by Jean-Paul Laurens

Ferdinand Simon Fabre (9 June 1827 – 11 February 1898) was a French novelist whose novels depict the life of the peasants and clergy of his native region, the upper valley of the river Orb, in the département of Hérault.

== Biography ==
Ferdinand Fabre was born in Bédarieux in the upper valley of the Orb, in the department of Hérault, the setting for his novels. Under the influence of his mother, he entered a small seminary at Saint-Pons-de-Thomières and, in 1847, a larger seminary at Montpellier. He was brought up by his uncle, the Abbé Fulcran Fabre, at Camplong, and he gave an account of his childhood and early youth in Ma Vocation. His experiences in the ecclesiastical milieux provide one of the main themes of his novels.

In 1848, before taking his final vows, he experienced an ecstatic vision of Christ, who warned him "It is not the will of God that you should be a priest." He abandoned his priestly vocation and briefly studied medicine at Montpellier. He then went to Paris and was articled as a clerk to a lawyer. In 1853 he published a volume of verses, Feuilles de lierre, but after a breakdown in health he returned to his old home at Bédarieux. After some eight or nine years of country life he reappeared in Paris with the manuscript of his first novel, Les Courbezon.

In 1861, shortly after his marriage, he became the Inspecteur de la Librarie Étrangère at the customs house in Calais. He eventually left his civil service position and devoted himself entirely to literary work, moving to Paris where his social circle included many writers and artists. Among his closest friends was the writer Hector Malot; Fabre was also a close friend of the painter Jean-Paul Laurens, whose biography he wrote. By the time of his death he had published about 20 novels, many of which dealt with the daily business of country priests in the Cévennes. Although he never became a priest, he maintained an understanding of, and a sympathy with, the clerical character, and he always denied that he was hostile to the Church.

His daughter Valentine Clotilde Fabre was born in 1858 and died in 1942. She married Ferdinand Auguste Emile Duviard (1859–1949) and gave birth to a son Ferdinand Duviard (1889–1965), who became a writer and Esperantist, and a daughter Henriette Léonie Duviard (1895–1974).

Ferdinand Fabre died in Paris, five days before his agreed-upon election to the Académie française. Rue Ferdinand-Fabre, in the 15th arrondissement de Paris, is named in his honor.

His novel Le Chevrier (and the poem by Maurice Audubert-Boussat) inspired the 1925 opera Le Chevrier by Émile Goué. Fabre's novel Xavière inspired the 1895 opera Xavière by Théodore Dubois.

== Selected works ==
- Feuilles de lierre (1853)
- Les Courbezon, scènes de la vie cléricale (1861), ouvrage distingué par l'Académie française
- Julien Savignac, scènes de la vie cléricale (1863)
- Mademoiselle de Malavieille (1865)
- Le Chevrier (1867)
- Un grand coupable (1872)
- L'Abbé Tigrane (1873) Online text (in French)
- Barnabé (1873)
- Le Marquis de Pierrerue (1874)
- La Petite Mère (1877)
- Le Roman d'un peintre (1878), biographie de Jean-Paul Laurens
- L'Hospitalière, drame rustique en cinq journées (1880)
- Mon Oncle Célestin, mœurs cléricales (1881), Lunas et la Saint-Fulcran de Lodève
- Lucifer (1884)
- Le Roi Ramire, comédie en 3 actes (1884)
- Monsieur Jean (1886)
- Toussaint Galabru (1887)
- Madame Fuster (1887)
- Œuvres de Ferdinand Fabre (4 volumes, 1888-1892) Online text (vol. 2) in French
- Ma Vocation (1889), séjour de l'auteur au séminaire de Montpellier Online text (in French)
- Norine (1889)
- Germy (1890)
- Un illuminé (1890)
- L'Abbé Roitelet (1890) Online text (in French)
- Xavière (1890)
- Sylviane (1892)
- Mon ami Gaffarot (1895)
- Taillevent (1897) Online text (in French)
- Ma jeunesse. Mon cas littéraire. M^{gr} Fulgence (1903), séjour de l'auteur au séminaire de Montpellier

== Critical reception ==
- The French critic and dramatist, Jules Lemaître, wrote that Fabre's unrivaled ability to depict priests and peasants sprang from two sources: the mountain and the church.
- The critic Jules Claretie described Fabre as the 'Balzac du clergé'.

== Monuments ==
- Buste de Ferdinand Fabre in the Jardin du Luxembourg (1880), by the sculptor Laurent Honoré Marqueste. The bust of Ferdinand Fabre is accompanied by a chevrière (female goatherd) with a goat.

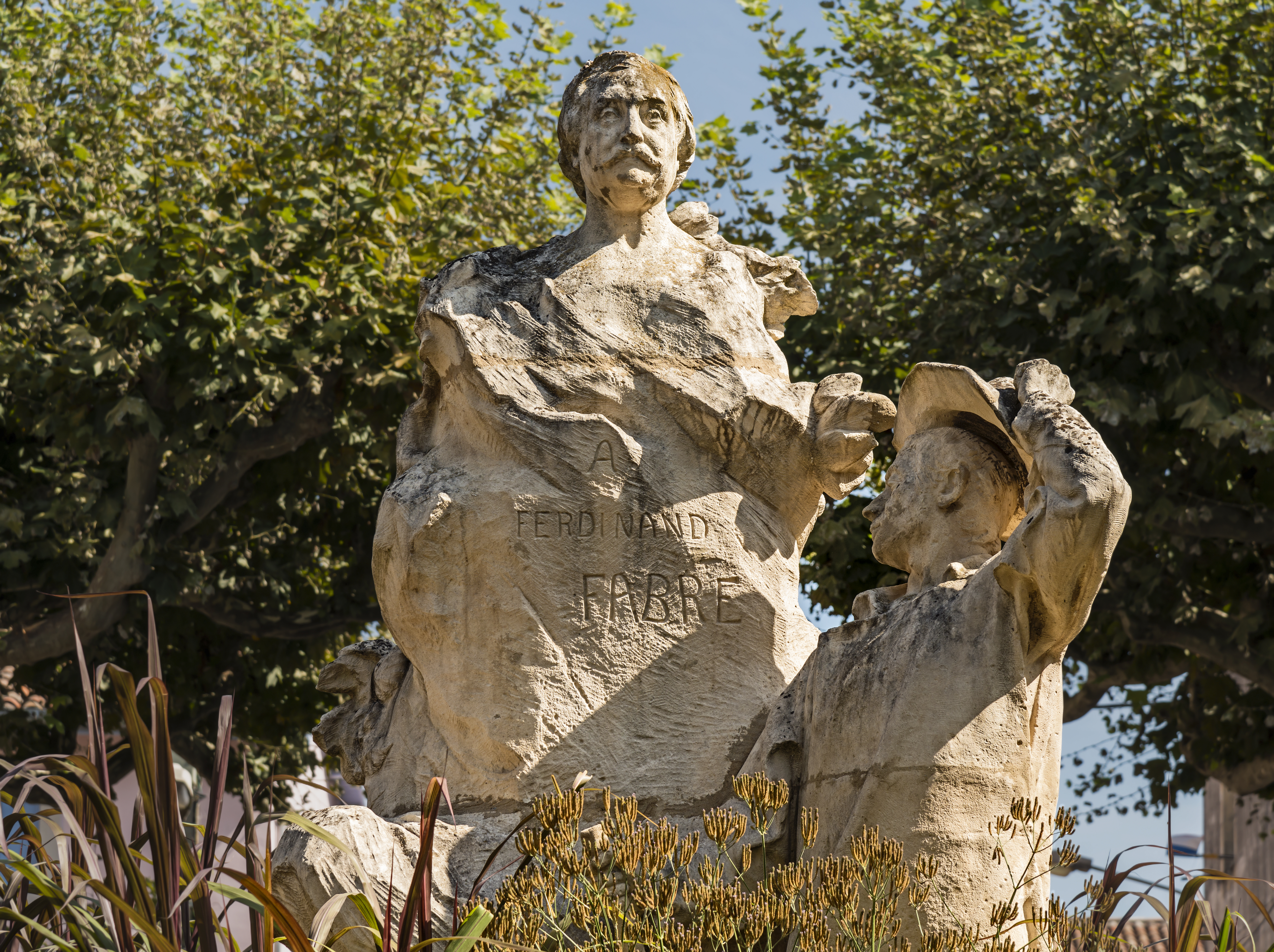
Bust at Bédarieux by the sculptor Jacques Villeneuve

- Buste de Ferdinand Fabre at Bédarieux, by the sculptor Jacques Villeneuve (1863–1933). A chevrier (male goatherd) greets the writer in the company of a dog and a goat.
