= Bédarieux =

- Commune
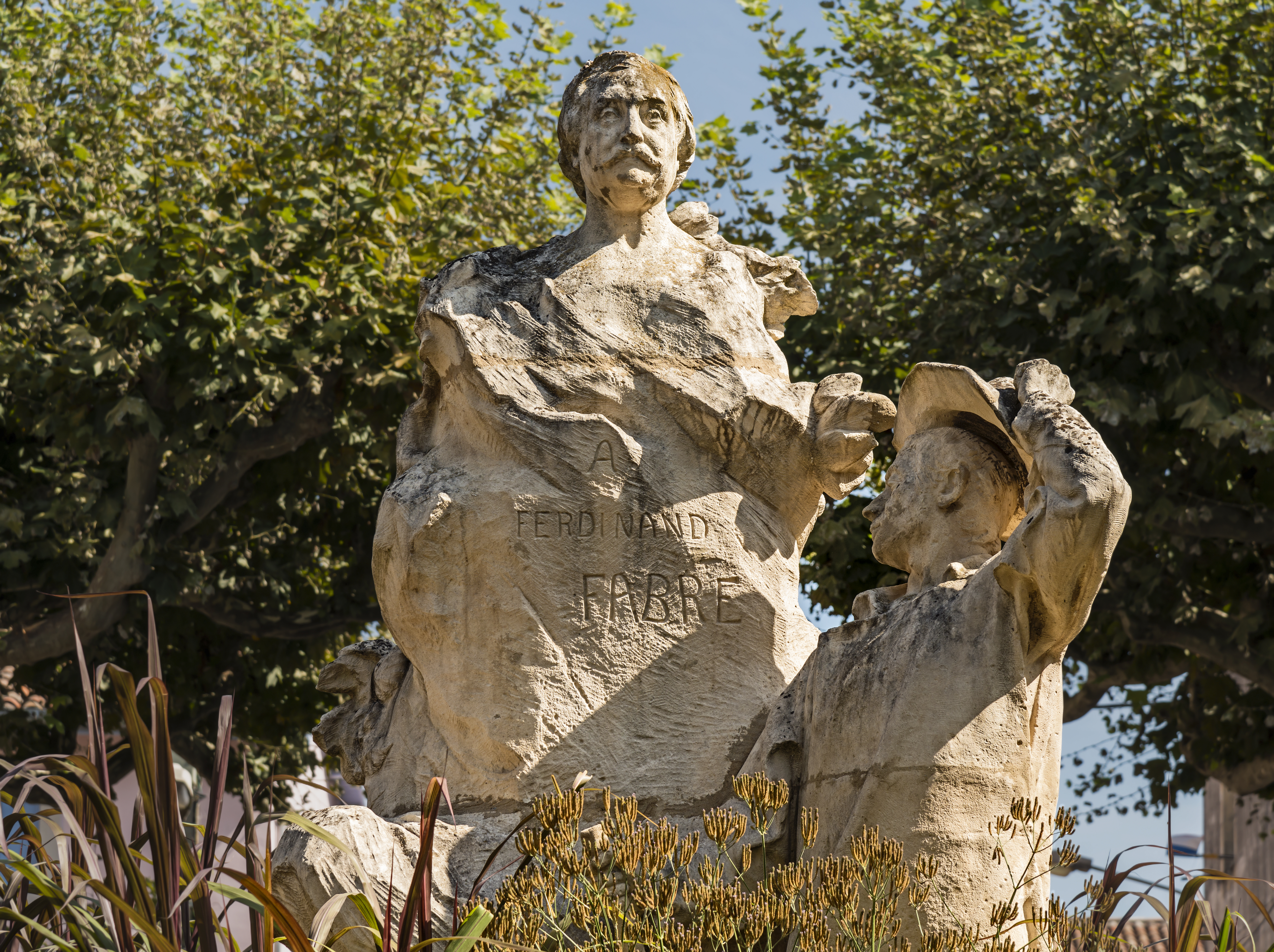
- Statue of Ferdinand Fabre

- Coat of arms
- Location of Bédarieux
- Location within France Location within Occitanie
- Coordinates: 43°37′01″N 3°09′35″E
- Country: France
- Region: Occitania
- Department: Hérault
- Arrondissement: Béziers
- Canton: Clermont-l'Hérault

Government
  - Mayor (2020–2026): Francis Barsse
- Area^{1}: 27.82 km^{2} (10.74 sq mi)
- Elevation: 196 m (643 ft)
- Highest elevation: 520 m (1,710 ft)
- Lowest elevation: 184 m (604 ft)
- Population (2023): 5,804
  - Density: 208.6/km^{2} (540.3/sq mi)
- Time zone: UTC+01:00 (CET)
  - Summer (DST): UTC+02:00 (CEST)
- INSEE/Postal code: 34028 /34600
- ^{1} French Land Register data, which excludes lakes, ponds, glaciers > 1 km^{2} (0.386 sq mi or 247 acres) and river estuaries.

Bédarieux (French pronunciation: [bedaʁjø]; Occitan: Bedarius) is a town and commune in the Hérault department in the region of Occitanie in southern France. The town is surrounded by the Espinouse mountain and Orb river, and is in the Haut-Languedoc Regional Nature Park.

The inhabitants are called Bédariciens.

== Geography ==
Bédarieux is 56 km (35 mi) west of Montpellier and 30 km (19 mi) north of Béziers. The commune is in the Orb valley, the river flowing north–south into Bédarieux and east–west downstream.

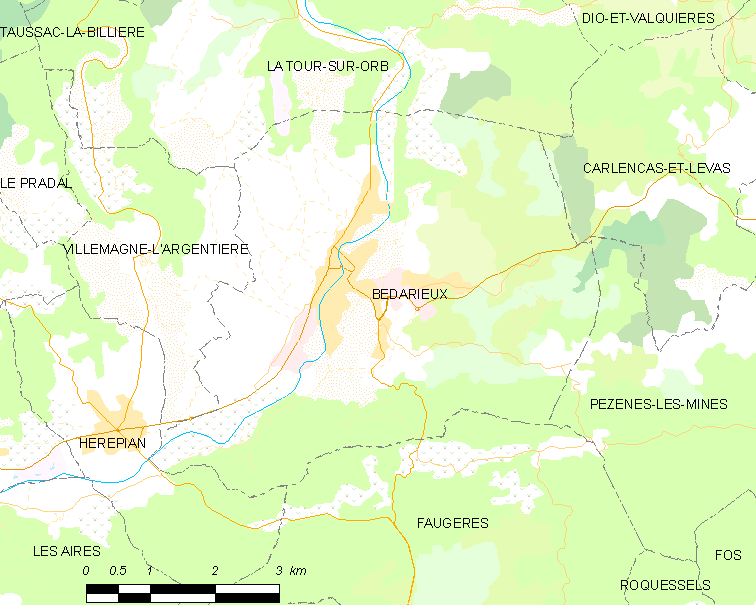
Map

=== Climate ===
Bédarieux has a mediterranean climate (Köppen climate classification Csa). The average annual temperature in Bédarieux is 13.6 °C (56.5 °F). The average annual rainfall is 1,008.6 mm (39.71 in) with October as the wettest month. The temperatures are highest on average in July, at around 22.4 °C (72.3 °F), and lowest in January, at around 6.2 °C (43.2 °F). The highest temperature ever recorded in Bédarieux was 40.6 °C (105.1 °F) on 12 August 2003; the coldest temperature ever recorded was −8.7 °C (16.3 °F) on 8 February 2012.

Climate data for Bédarieux (1981–2010 averages, extremes 1991−present)
Month	Jan	Feb	Mar	Apr	May	Jun	Jul	Aug	Sep	Oct	Nov	Dec	Year
Record high °C (°F)	19.8 (67.6)	24.4 (75.9)	25.7 (78.3)	28.4 (83.1)	33.6 (92.5)	39.7 (103.5)	37.9 (100.2)	40.6 (105.1)	34.7 (94.5)	30.3 (86.5)	23.9 (75.0)	19.9 (67.8)	40.6 (105.1)
Mean daily maximum °C (°F)	9.8 (49.6)	10.8 (51.4)	14.3 (57.7)	16.9 (62.4)	21.4 (70.5)	25.9 (78.6)	28.8 (83.8)	28.5 (83.3)	23.3 (73.9)	18.2 (64.8)	13.0 (55.4)	10.1 (50.2)	18.5 (65.3)
Daily mean °C (°F)	6.2 (43.2)	6.7 (44.1)	9.6 (49.3)	11.9 (53.4)	15.9 (60.6)	19.8 (67.6)	22.4 (72.3)	22.2 (72.0)	17.8 (64.0)	14.1 (57.4)	9.4 (48.9)	6.6 (43.9)	13.6 (56.5)
Mean daily minimum °C (°F)	2.7 (36.9)	2.6 (36.7)	4.9 (40.8)	6.9 (44.4)	10.3 (50.5)	13.8 (56.8)	16.0 (60.8)	16.0 (60.8)	12.4 (54.3)	10.0 (50.0)	5.7 (42.3)	3.1 (37.6)	8.7 (47.7)
Record low °C (°F)	−7.8 (18.0)	−8.7 (16.3)	−7.8 (18.0)	−3.3 (26.1)	0.5 (32.9)	5.8 (42.4)	9.0 (48.2)	6.8 (44.2)	3.3 (37.9)	−2.5 (27.5)	−8.0 (17.6)	−7.8 (18.0)	−8.7 (16.3)
Average precipitation mm (inches)	102.3 (4.03)	73.6 (2.90)	51.4 (2.02)	90.5 (3.56)	83.8 (3.30)	40.6 (1.60)	34.6 (1.36)	45.3 (1.78)	110.0 (4.33)	142.2 (5.60)	109.9 (4.33)	124.4 (4.90)	1,008.6 (39.71)
Average precipitation days (≥ 1.0 mm)	8.3	6.4	6.5	8.3	7.4	4.8	3.9	5.2	6.4	8.8	7.5	8.2	81.5
Source: Meteociel

== History ==
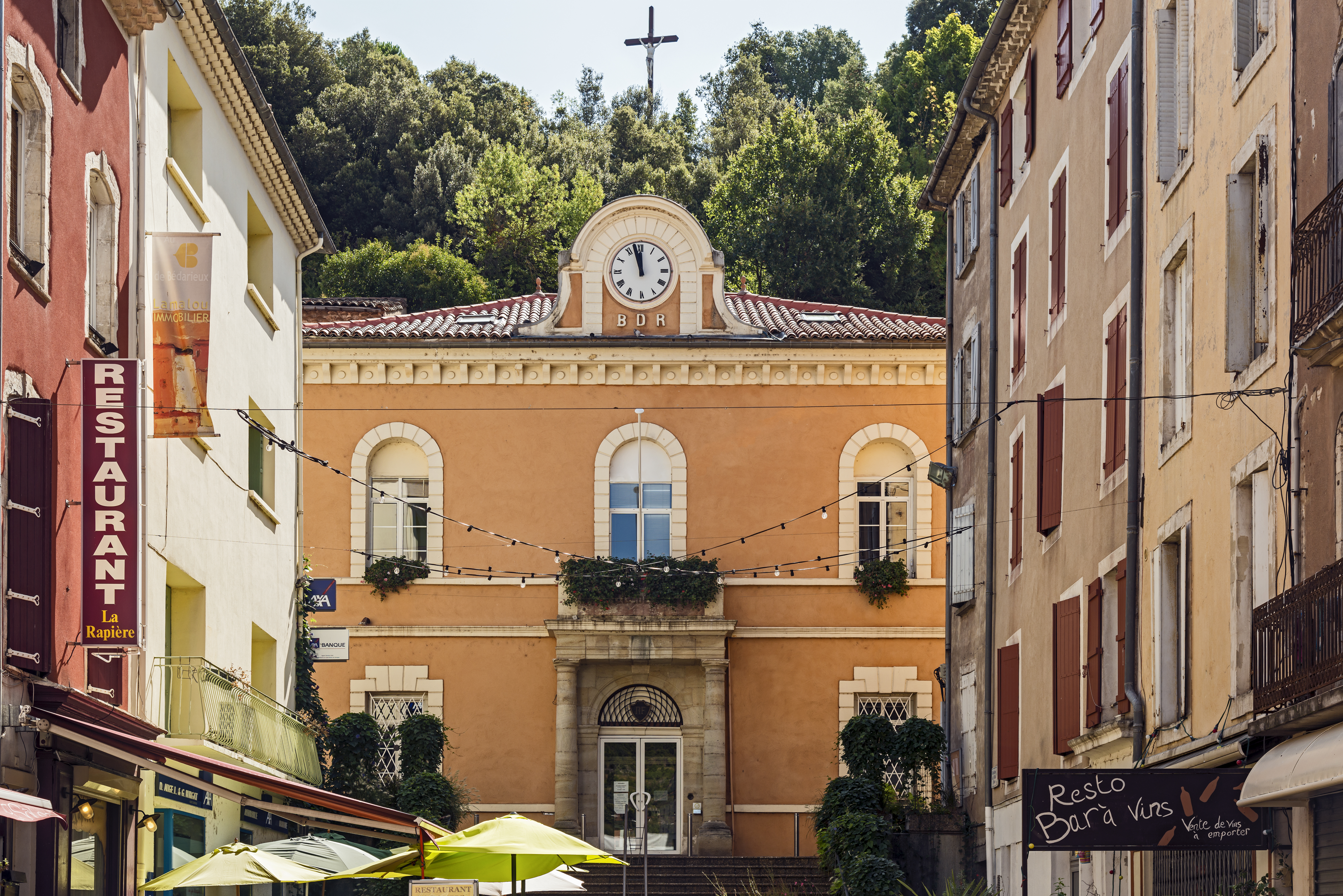
Town hall

Archaeological digs conducted in the 'rues Basses' district during the 1910s found Roman coins dating from the 4th century AD, suggesting the presence of a Gallo-Roman villa. The earliest mention of the town dates back to the 12th century. The Saint-Nazaire de Lodéran chapel (now disappeared) was mentioned in 1153.

From the end of the 12th century, Bédarieux saw a rapid development of manufacturing activity. Its cloth-weaving industry, carried on under a special royal privilege from the end of the 17th century to the French Revolution, employed in 1789 as many as 5,000 workmen, while some thousand more were employed in wool and cotton spinning, etc. Because of the introduction of modern machinery from England and loss of trade with the Levant, Bédarieux's industries declined. However, they somewhat revived in the late 19th century owing partly to the opening up of Bauxite and coal mines in the neighbourhood.

Bédarieux's first municipal council dates back to 1790. At around the same time the town became the cantonal capital. During the French Revolution, the citizens of the commune of Bédarieux formed a revolutionary club called 'Société des Amis de la Constitution' (the society of the friends of the constitution). It had 250 members.

After Louis-Napoleon's coup d'état on 2 December 1851, Bédarieux's republicans managed to hold the town for a few hours. The press claimed that these insurgents had devoured the corpse of the maréchal des logis, Léotard, who had been fighting for Napoléon III. This claim appears to be untrue, but it seems that they may have urinated on his corpse and burnt his mustaches.

The railway came to Bédarieux in the 1850s. A 710 metre-long viaduct was constructed across the Orb valley, giving rail access to the coal mines at Graissessac. The railway facilitated communications with Béziers, Sète and Marseille, benefiting Bédarieux's wool and leather trade.

During the twentieth century Bédarieux was badly affected by the two world wars and industrial decline. In response, Bédarieux has focused on developing tourism and its cultural industries, as well as seeking to attract new enterprises. Recent improvements include a new sewage treatment plant, several enterprise zones and 'La Tuilerie' - a multipurpose community center that can host conferences, concerts, theatricals and exhibitions.

== Population ==
Historical population

Year	Pop.	±% p.a.
1793	3,302	—
1800	3,330	+0.12%
1806	3,827	+2.35%
1821	5,418	+2.34%
1831	5,998	+1.02%
1836	8,293	+6.69%
1841	9,012	+1.68%
1846	9,369	+0.78%
1851	9,959	+1.23%
1856	9,829	−0.26%
1861	9,087	−1.56%
1866	8,985	−0.23%
1872	7,892	−2.14%
1876	7,691	−0.64%
1881	6,923	−2.08%
1886	7,320	+1.12%
1891	6,578	−2.11%
1896	5,968	−1.93%
1901	6,106	+0.46%

Year	Pop.	±% p.a.
1906	6,131	+0.08%
1911	6,186	+0.18%
1921	6,505	+0.50%
1926	7,994	+4.21%
1931	9,224	+2.90%
1936	8,512	−1.59%
1946	7,033	−1.89%
1954	7,416	+0.67%
1962	7,263	−0.26%
1968	7,135	−0.30%
1975	6,425	−1.49%
1982	6,207	−0.49%
1990	5,997	−0.43%
1999	5,962	−0.07%
2007	6,576	+1.23%
2012	6,297	−0.86%
2017	5,791	−1.66%
2023	5,804	+0.04%

Source: EHESS and INSEE (1968-2023)

== Twin towns ==
Bédarieux is twinned with:

- Leutkirch im Allgäu, Germany, since 1982
- Medenine, Tunisia, since 1999
- Ouarzazate, Morocco, since 2008

== Sights ==
- Several streets in Bédarieux retain their 17th-century architecture.
- The former castle, La Bastide dates from the fourteenth century. It has machicolations, arrow slits and a 16th-century well. A wooden beam has been dendrochronologically dated to 1350, but evidence exists to suggest this had been part of the machicolations of a lower, squatter tower. The well, too, may date from this first construction by the Abbey of Villemagne, (a nearby village) as part of the defences of the ford crossing the River Orb. A document dated 1156 records the king, Louis VII, granting the Abbot the right to extend the fortifications protecting his properties. This, it is assumed, included the construction of La Bastide. The whole property was sold into private hands in the late 16th century, when it became a domaine owning all the land between itself and Bédarieux, two kilometres away.
- The Promenade de la Perspective (1742), a dyke built to protect the town from the flooding of the river Orb. 200-year-old plane trees grow along its length.
- 16th-century bridge over the Orb
- 19th-century railway viaduct with 37 arches
- Church of Saint-Alexandre built in the 17th–19th century (though recorded in 1189)
- Maison des Arts: a museum occupying a former hospice. It was opened in 1976 and collects together regional heritage: painting, folklore, archaeology, geology, natural history, folk arts and traditions.

== Personalities ==
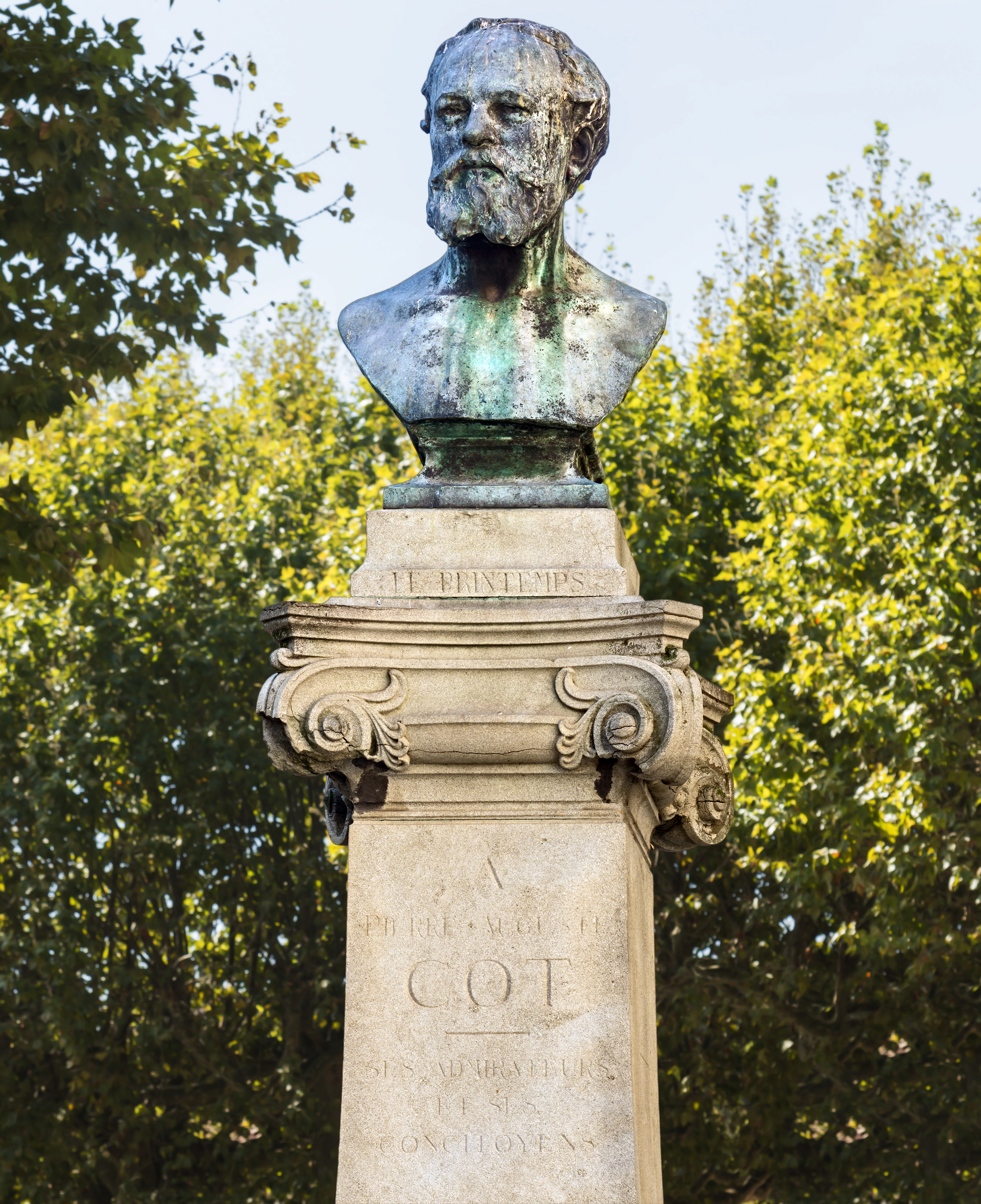
The monument to the painter Pierre Auguste Cot by the Sculptor Antonin Mercié. The monument is found at the Place Cot, Bédarieux.

- Paul Rabaut (1718–94): Protestant pastor.
- Guillaume d'Abbes de Cabrebolles (1718–1802), Encyclopédiste was born in Bédarieux.
- Louis-Annibal Escalle (1737–99): Adjudant-Général, one of Napoleon's lieutenants during his campaigns in Italy and Egypt, died at the siege of Acre.
- Ferdinand Fabre (1827–98): writer, novelist, mixing Occitan vocabulary with French in his works (Les Courbezon 1861, Mon oncle Célestin 1881, Toussaint Galabru 1887). He died five days before his election to the Académie Française.
- Pierre Auguste Cot (1837–83): French romantic painter. Le Printemps (Spring) is one of his best-known works.
- Eugène Vaillé (1875–1959): French postal historian and first curator of the French Postal Museum (musée postal de France), later the Museum of the Post Office.
- Guillaume Bouisset (born 7 January 1973), footballer
- Vincent Candela (born 24 October 1973), French footballer who played for many years in Italy, 40 appearances for his national team, including the World Cup in 1998.

== See also ==
- Communes of the Hérault department
