= Perseus and the Gorgon (Marqueste) =

1875–1903 series of sculptures by Laurent Marqueste

- Persée et la Gorgone (French)
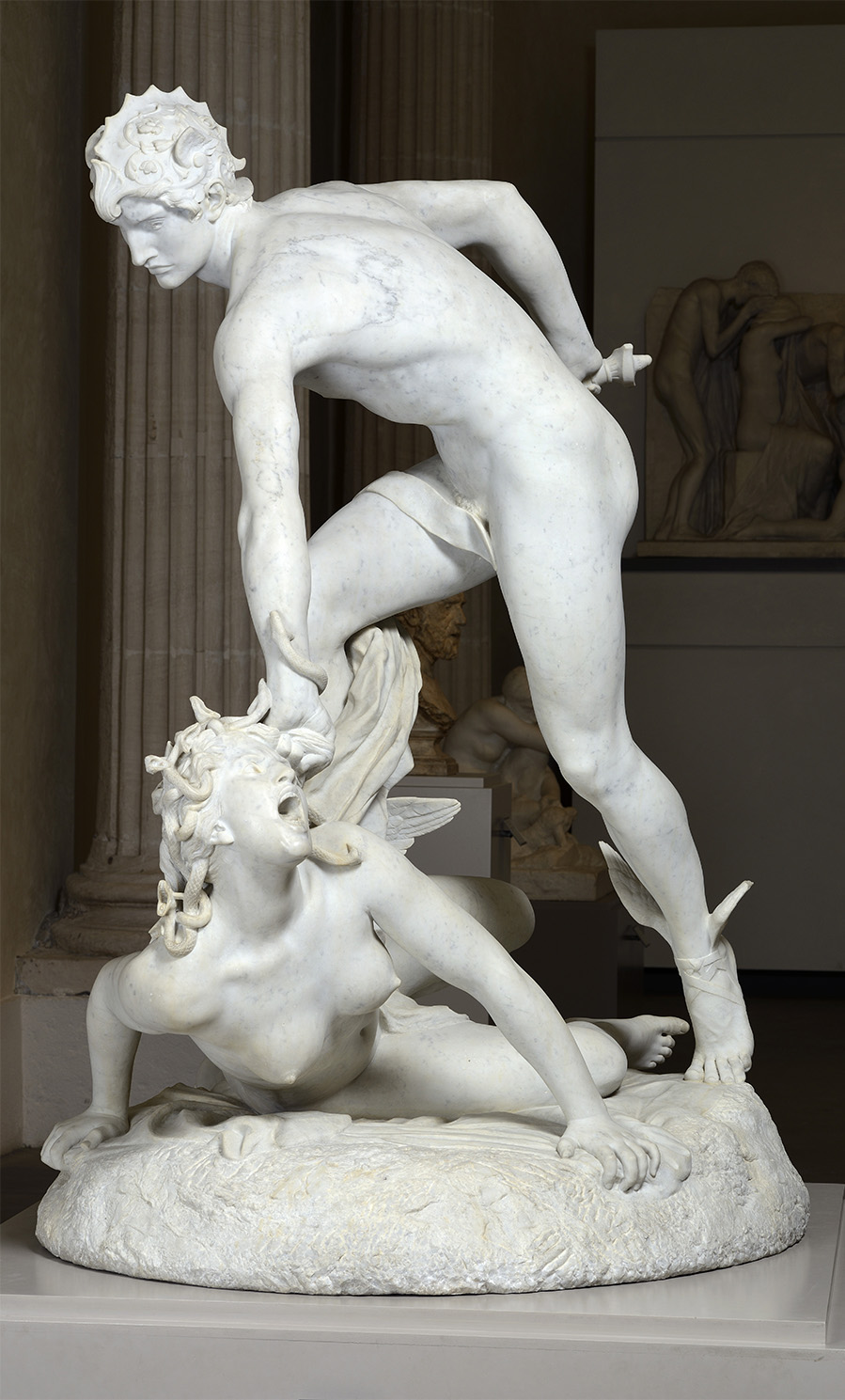
- White marble (1903, Ny Carlsberg Glyptotek)
- Artist: Laurent Marqueste
- Year: 1875–1903
- Medium: Sculpture
- Subject: Perseus
- Location: Musée des Augustins; Musée des Beaux-Arts de Lyon; Ny Carlsberg Glyptotek

Perseus and the Gorgon is a sculptural group by the French artist Laurent Marqueste composed of five statues made between 1875 and 1903. The works depict Perseus subduing and beheading Medusa.

Marqueste freezes the contest at its climax, with the figures in motion. Perseus hoists Medusa by the hair; the Gorgon screams in fear; and the hero raises his sword for the killing stroke.

Perseus is naked except for winged sandals from Hermes and a winged helmet from Hades. Following Greek tradition, he represents the physically perfect male hero. Muscular tension in his figure enhances the impression of movement, a hallmark of Baroque sculpture.

The first plaster model was made in 1875. A bronze statue was made from it in 1877, but the operation damaged the original plaster one. Marqueste had to make another plaster statue in 1887. He then made a marble version in 1890, and a second one in 1903. The versions vary primarily in how Perseus is draped.

== Plaster of 1887 ==
The earliest surviving example is now located in Musée des Augustins. Perseus is fully nude with no drapery.

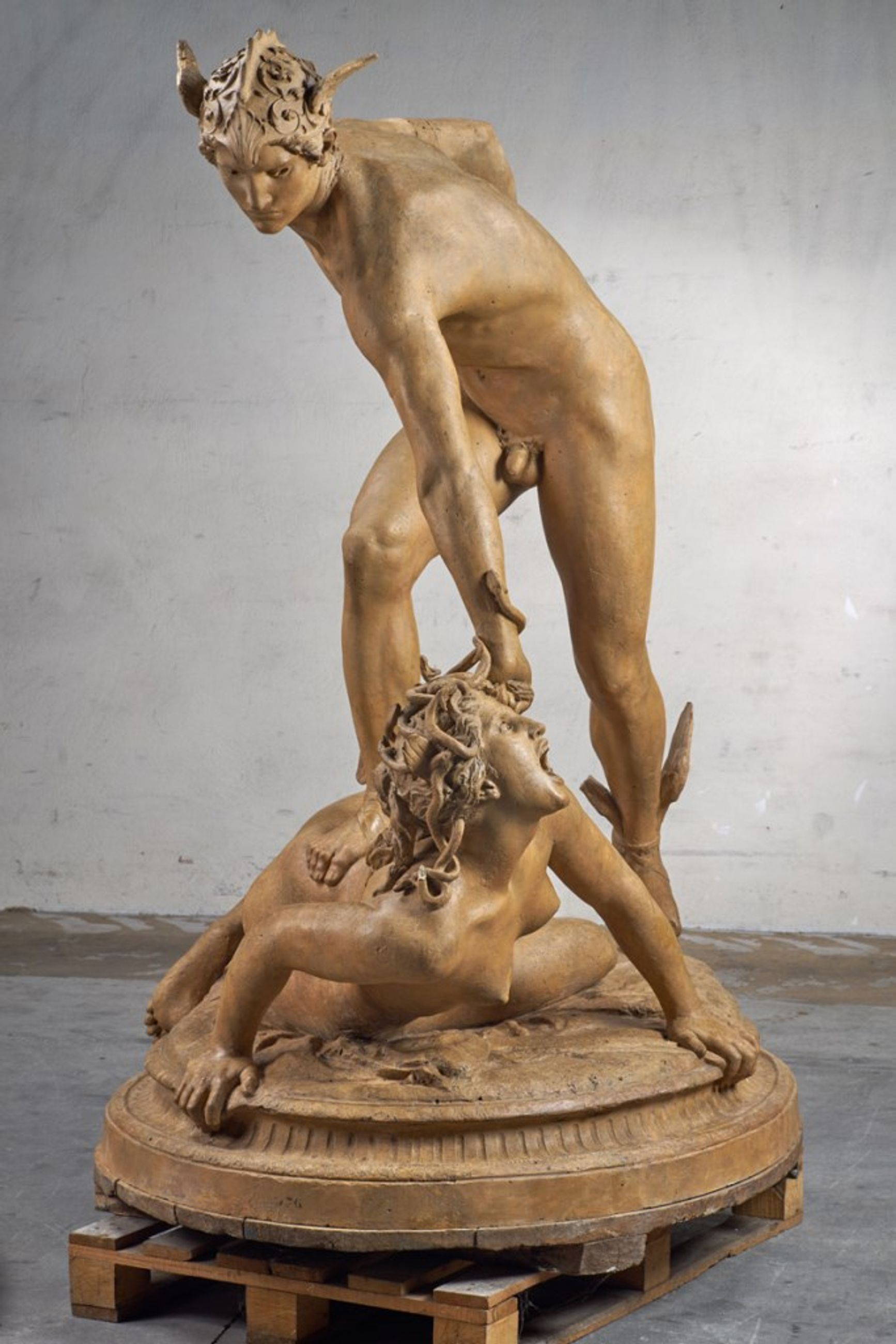

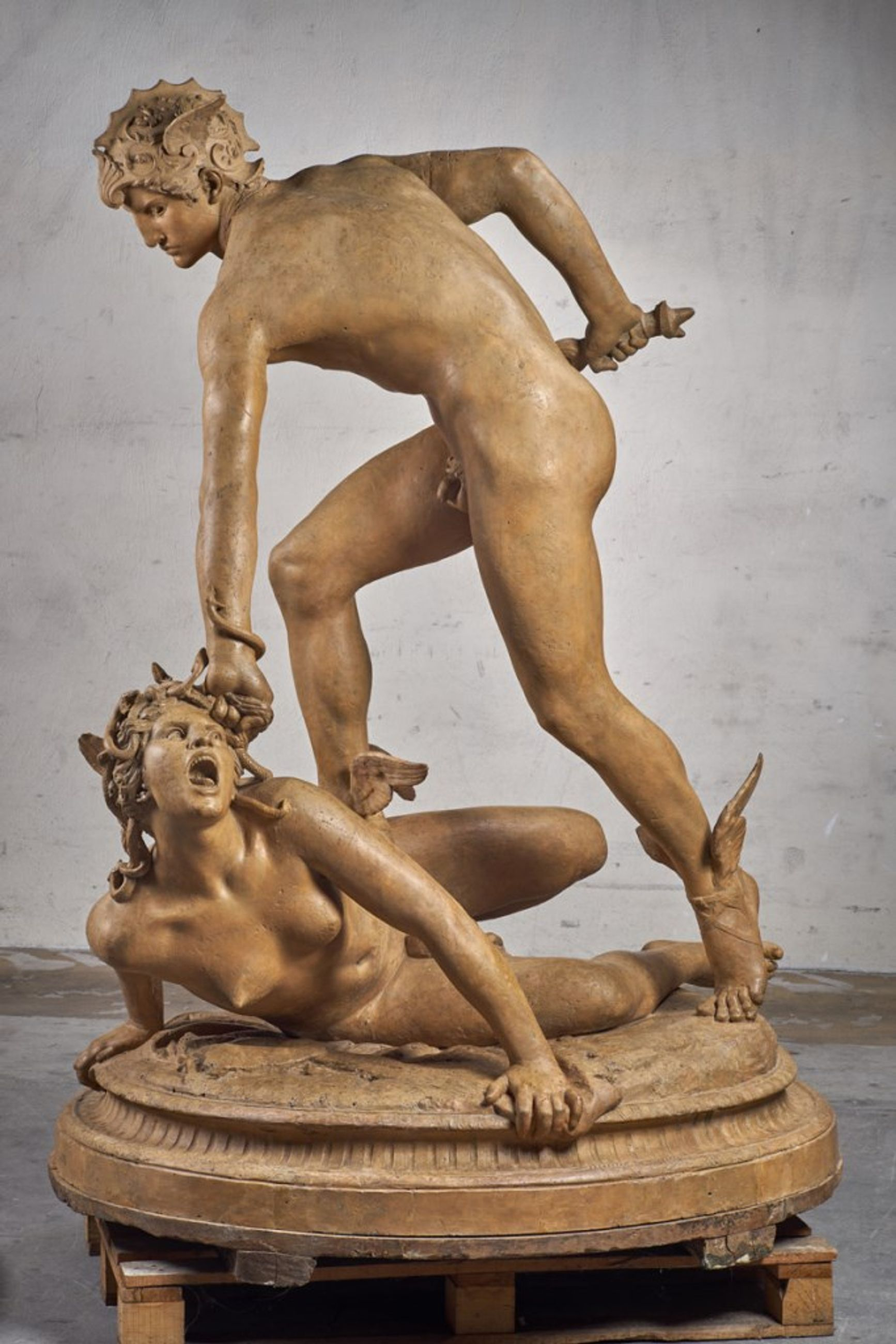

== White marble of 1890 ==
It is now in the chapel of the Musée des Beaux-Arts de Lyon. It was acquired by the French state in 1890 for 18,000 francs and was stored at the Musée du Luxembourg (1890-1913) and the Dépôt des marbres (from 1931). Until 1999 it was stored at Villeurbanne. It was moved to the Musée d’Orsay in 1986 and then to its present home in 1999. It was restored in 2000.

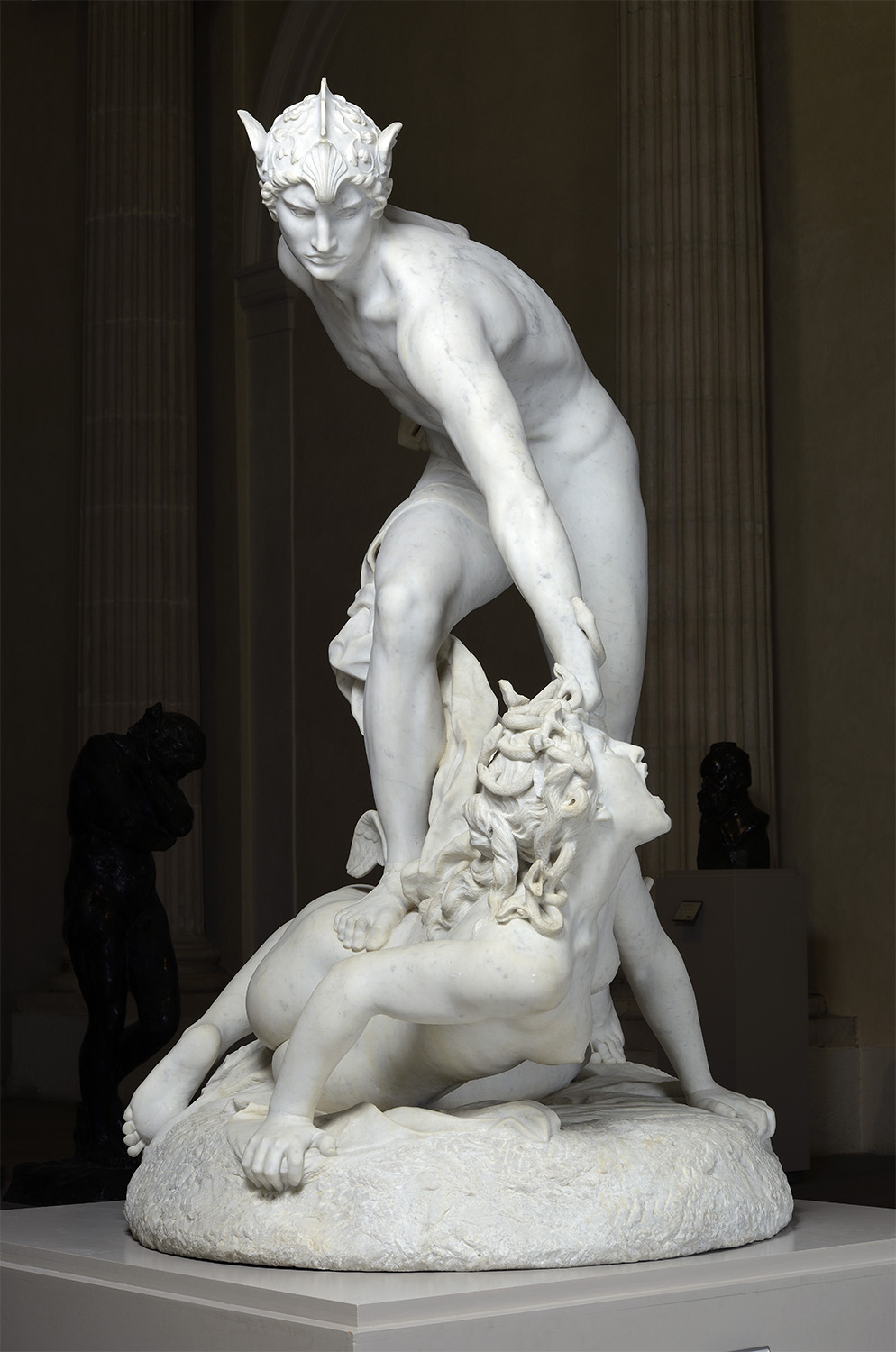

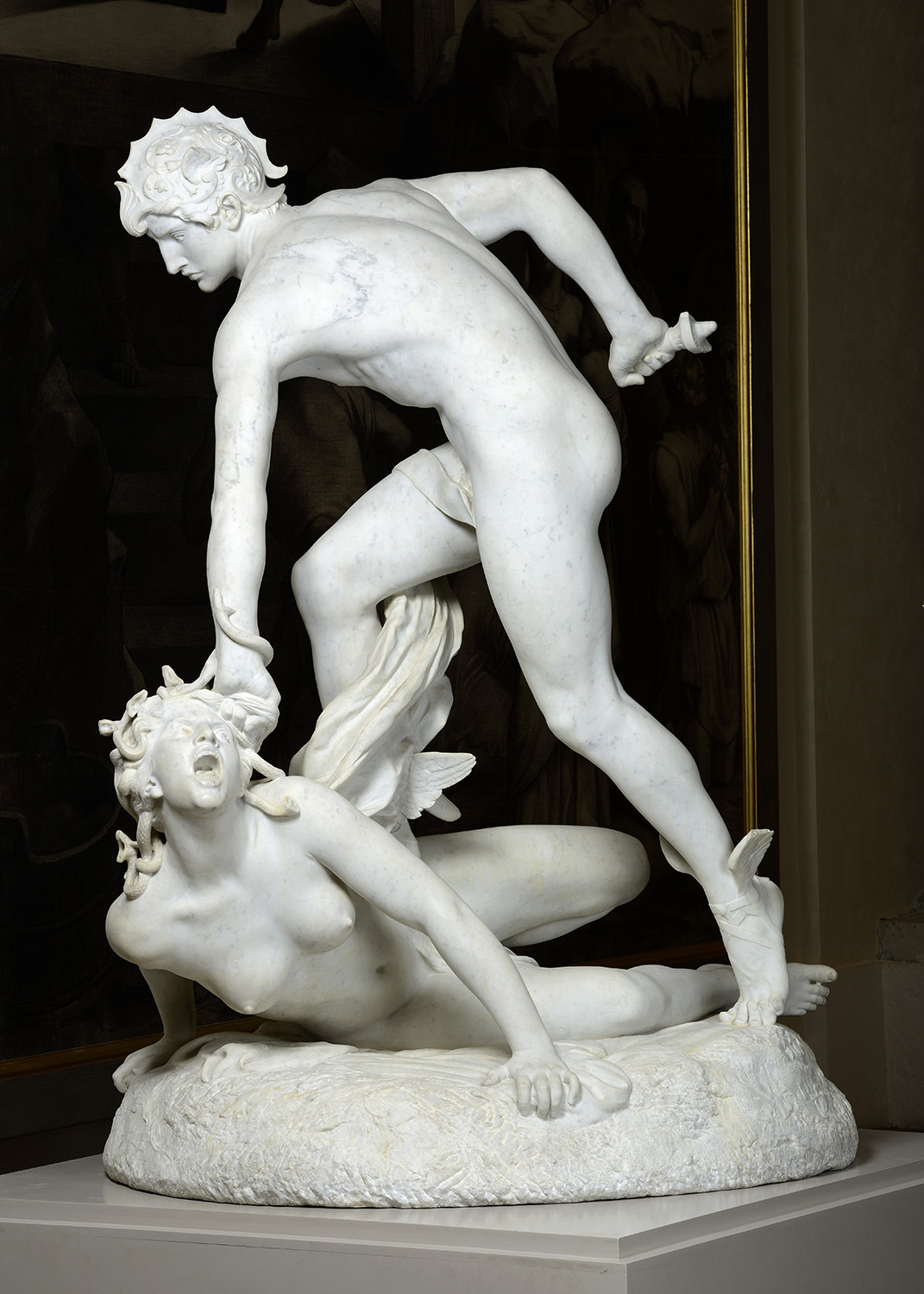

Perseus acquires a fig leaf in the form of a flowing drapery.

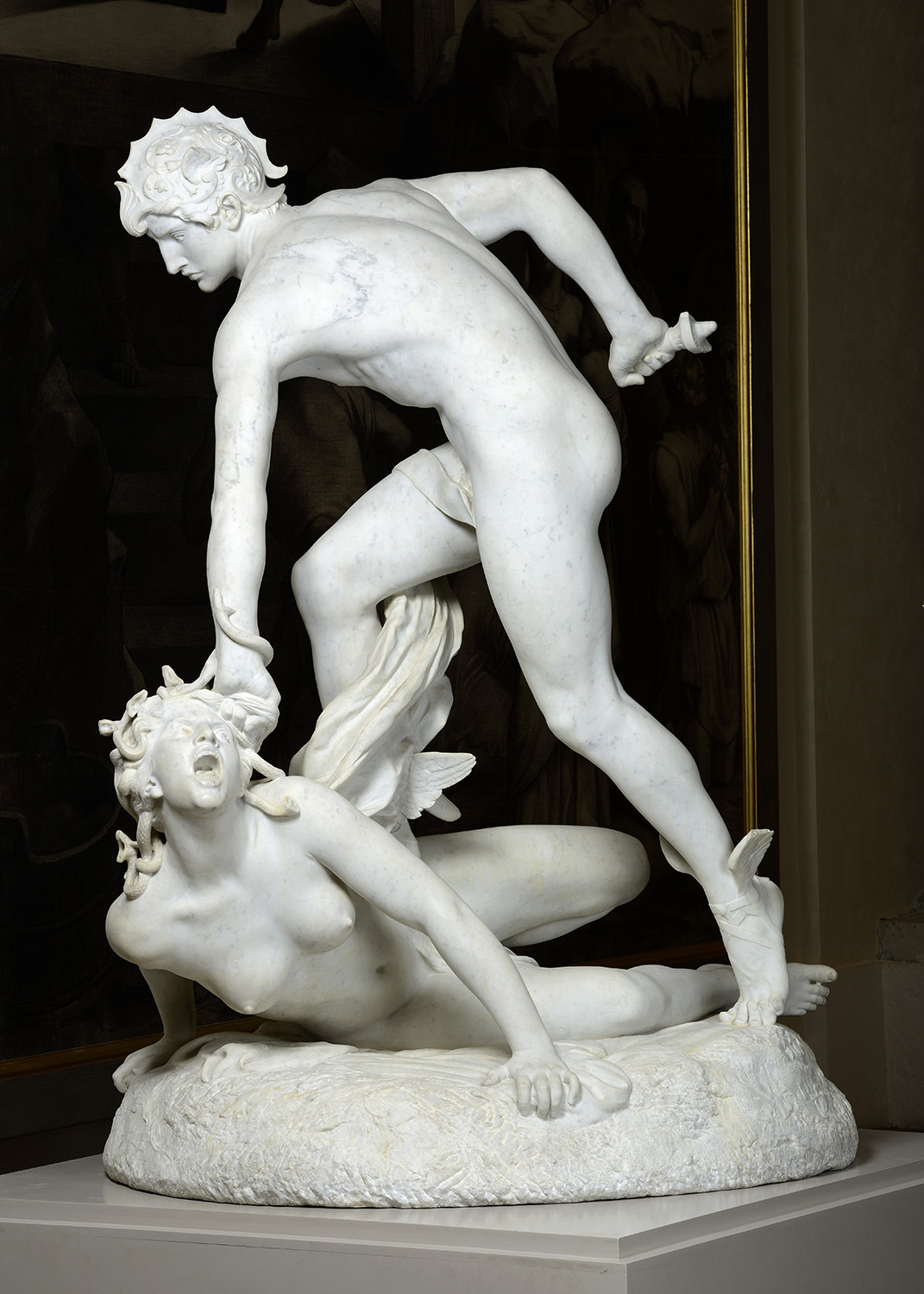
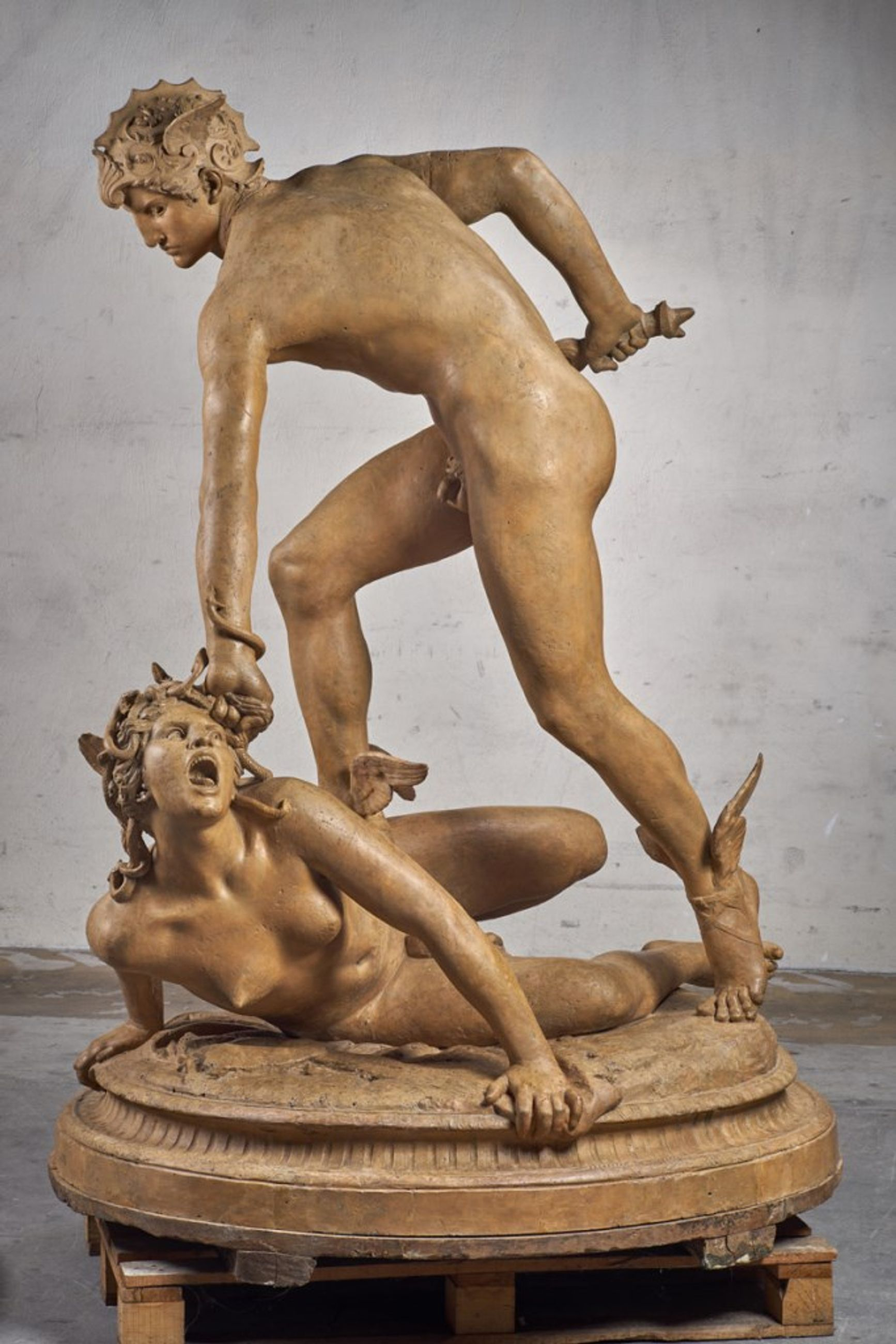
Perseus nude (1887) and draped (1890)

== White marble of 1903 ==
It is now located in the Ny Carlsberg Glyptotek in Copenhagen.

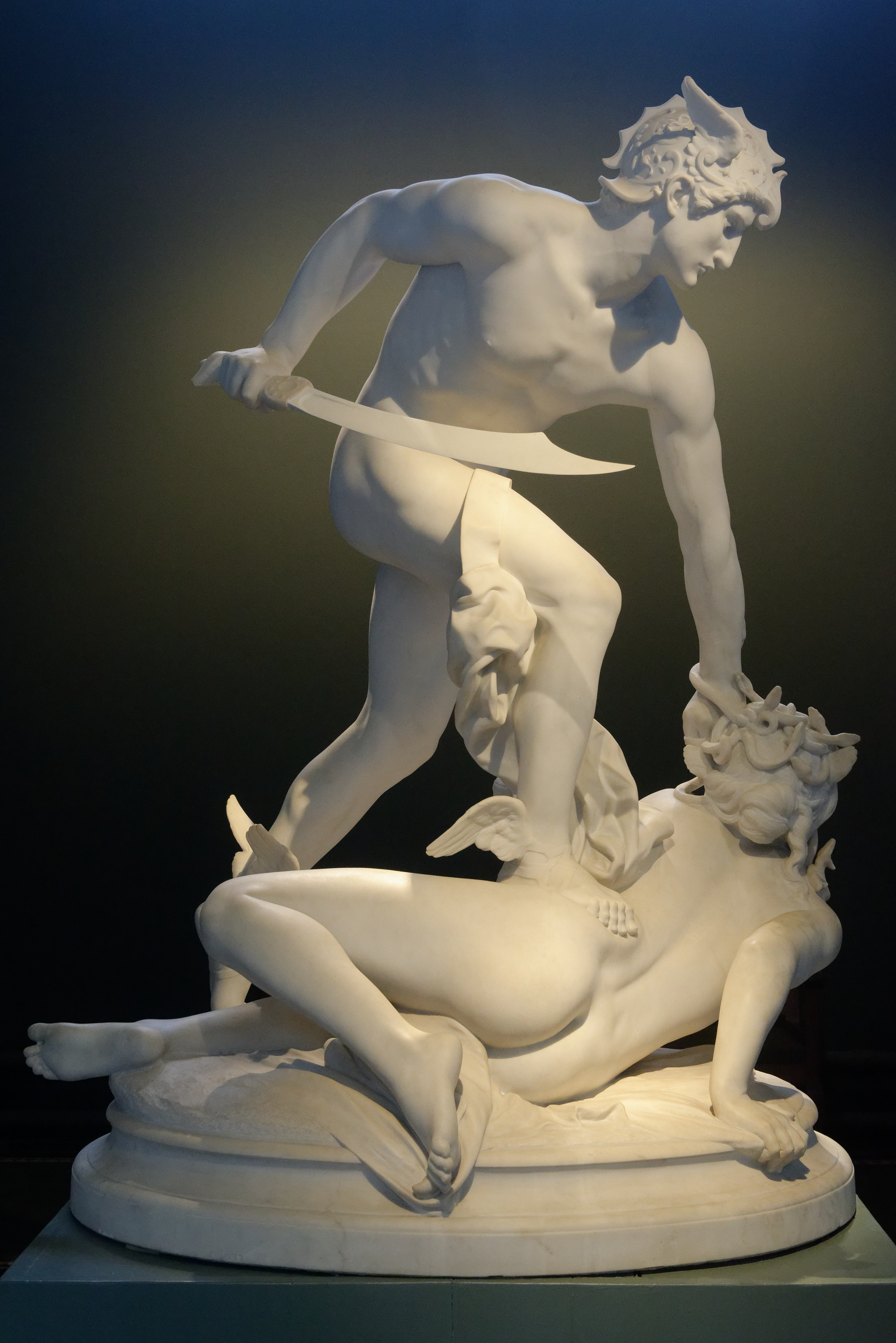

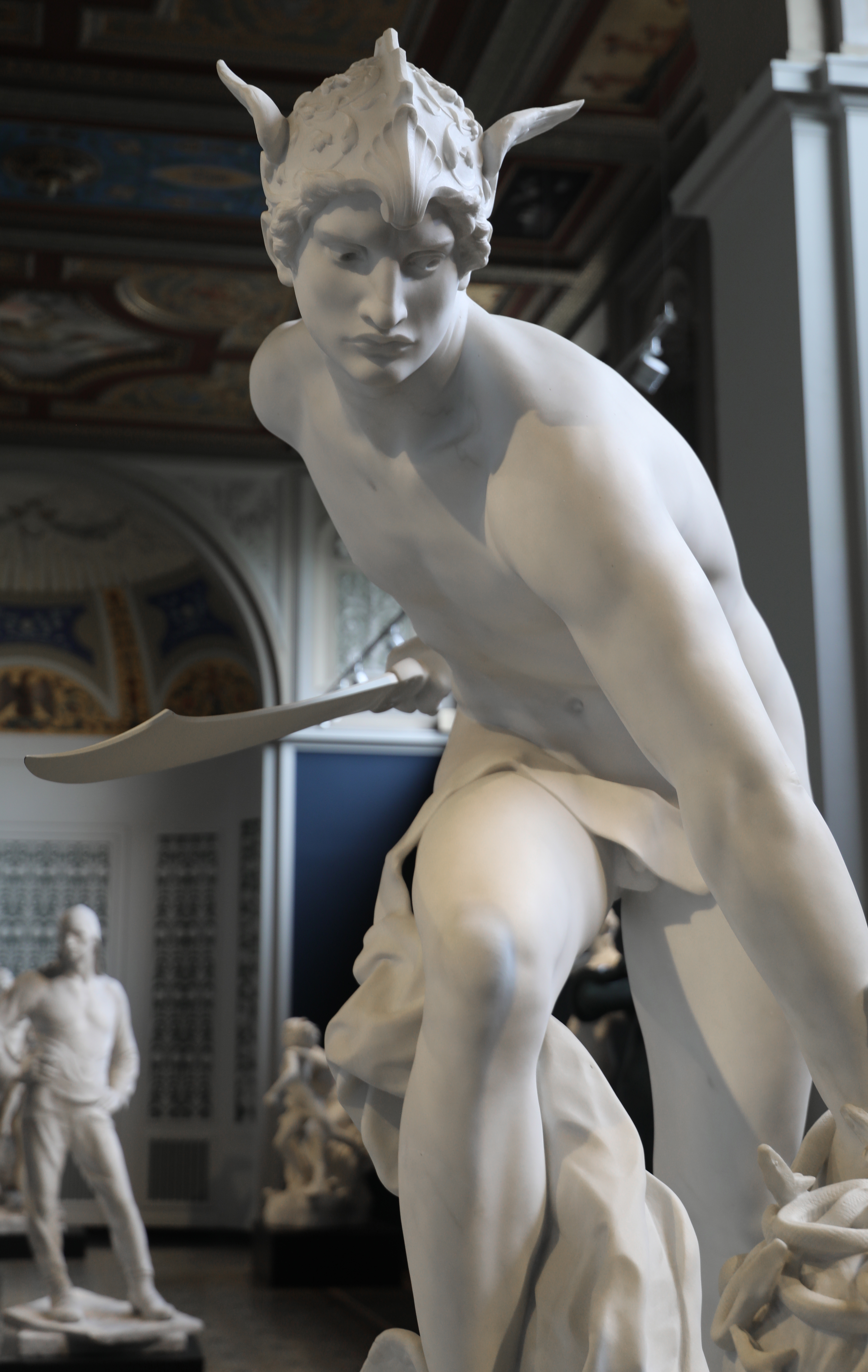

Marqueste retains the drapery of 1890 but places it higher, revealing the hero's genitals.

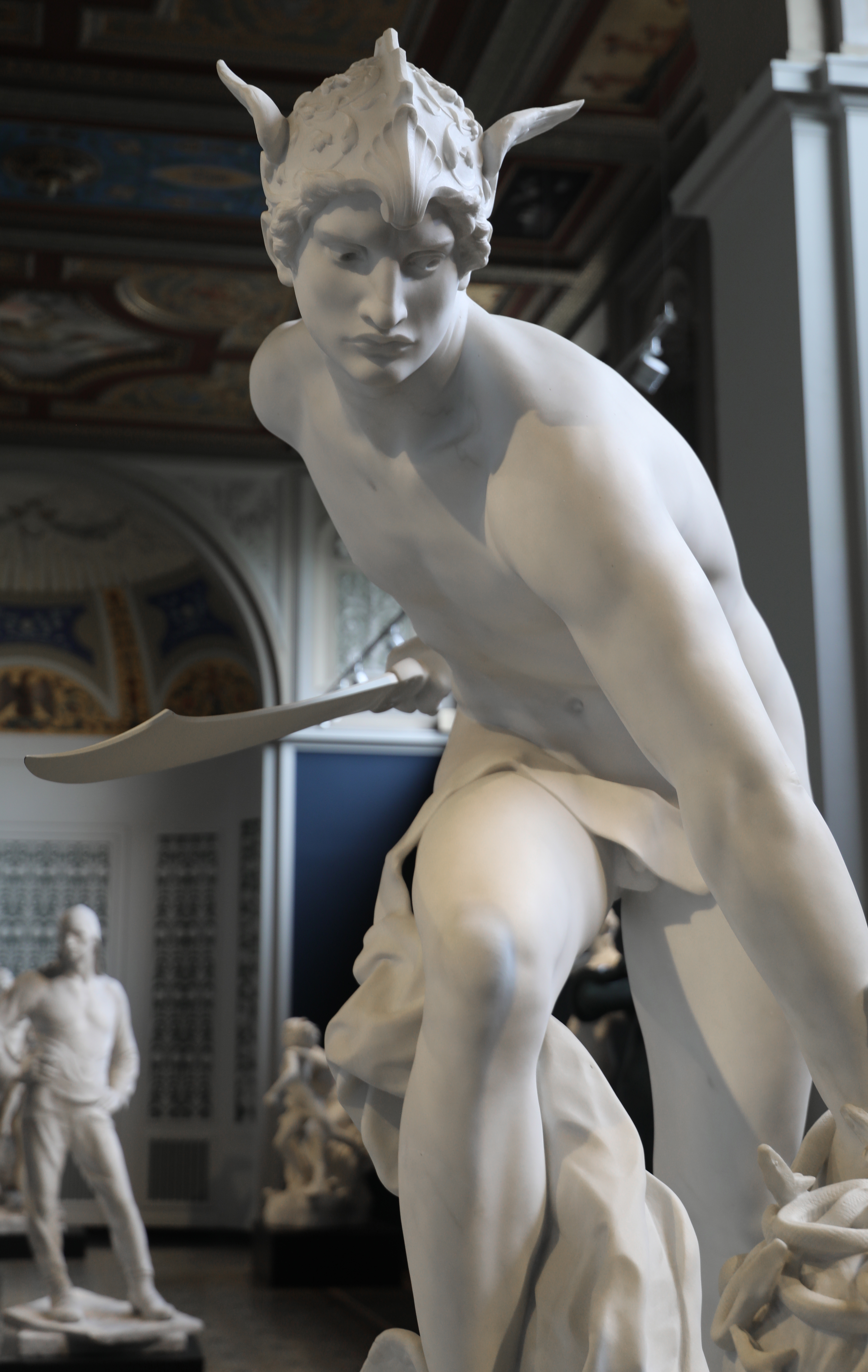
Perseus partially draped (1903)

== See also ==
- Perseus with the Head of Medusa, sculpture by Benvenuto Cellini
