= Guillaume Bouisset =

French footballer (born 1973)

Personal information
- Date of birth: 7 January 1973 (age 53)
- Place of birth: Bédarieux, France
- Height: 1.73 m (5 ft 8 in)
- Position: Defender

Senior career*
Years	Team	Apps	(Gls)
1992–1997	FC Martigues		
1997–1998	Guingamp		
1998–1999	Red Star	35	(6)
1999–2000	Amiens	30	(1)
2000–2001	Lens	1	(0)
- * Club domestic league appearances and goals

Guillaume Bouisset (born 7 January 1973) is a French former professional footballer who played as a defender.
