= Laurent Marqueste =

French sculptor (1848–1920)

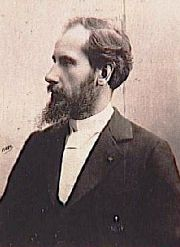
- Born: Laurent-Honoré Marqueste; 12 June 1848; Toulouse, France
- Died: 5 April 1920 (aged 71); Paris

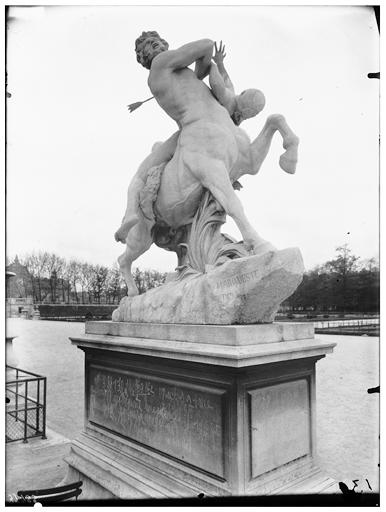
1911 picture of the statue of Nessus and Déjanire

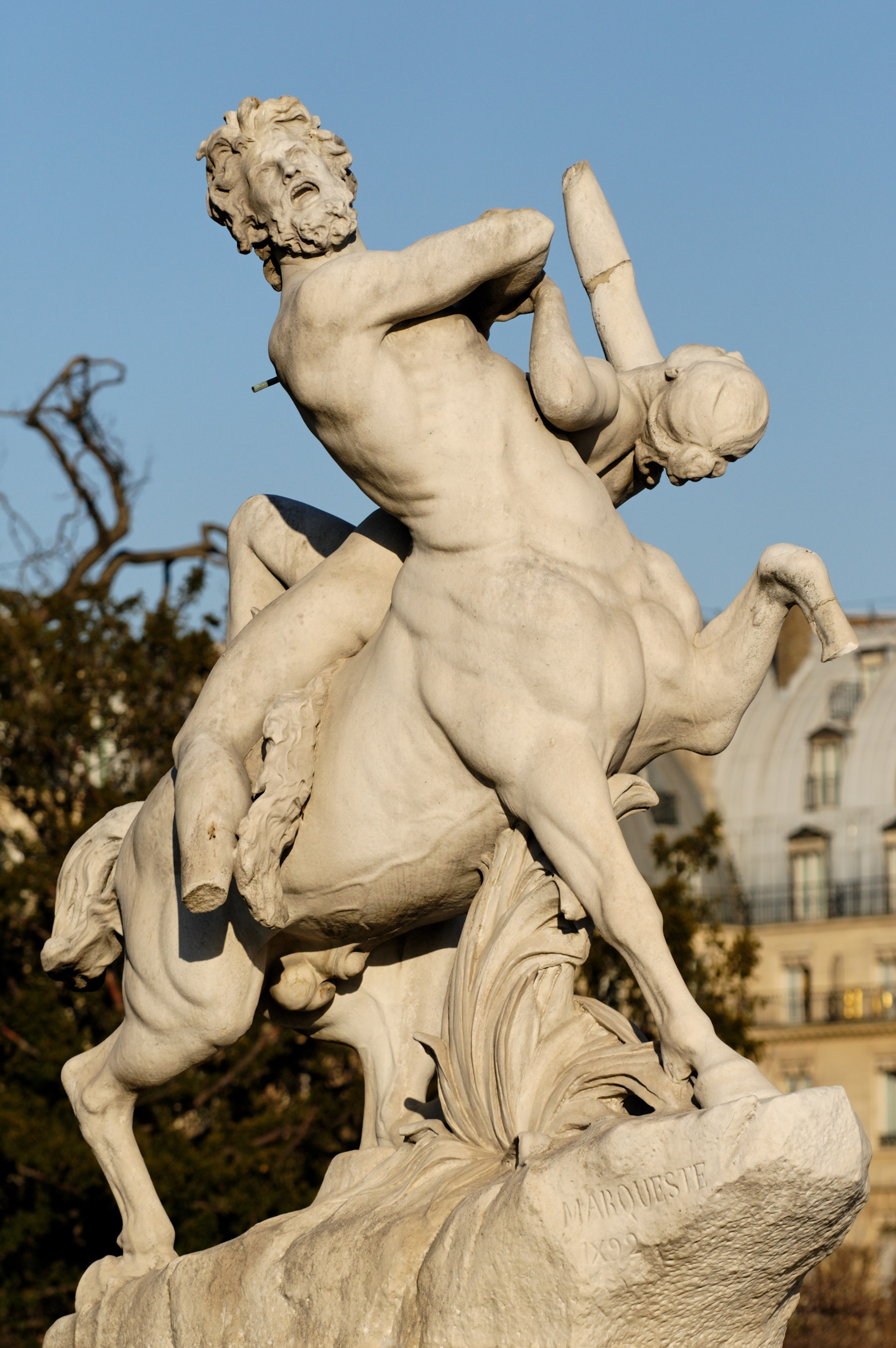
Nessus, 1892 (Tuileries Gardens, Paris). As can be seen in comparison with the statue in 1911, missing pieces are the arrow in Nessus and a foot and hand of Déjanire

Laurent-Honoré Marqueste (French pronunciation: [lɔʁɑ̃ ɔnɔʁe maʁkɛst]; Toulouse 12 June 1848 — Paris, 5 April 1920) was a French sculptor in the neo-Baroque Beaux-Arts tradition. He was a pupil of François Jouffroy and of Alexandre Falguière. Marqueste won the Prix de Rome in 1871.

== Life ==
Marqueste was born at Toulouse, 12 June 1848. He made his official debut at the Paris Salon of 1874 (with his painting Jacob and the Angel). In 1893, he became a professor at the École des Beaux-Arts of Paris. In 1884 he received the Legion of Honour (becoming an officer in 1894, and commander in 1903). He became a member of the Institut de France in 1894.

== Career ==
Marqueste's virtuosic work, often combining two figures, tended to be executed by specialist carvers working by pointing up his models, as had become common studio practice among French sculptors in the later nineteenth century.

Among his commissions are a large number of allegorical architectural figural sculptures, historical portraits (Victor Hugo, and Geographie for the Sorbonne, 1901) and others for the monumental Gare d'Orsay (now the Musée d'Orsay), the Beaux-Arts de Paris, the Grand Palais for the 1900 Exposition, and the Hôtel Dufayel, Avenue des Champs-Élysées (1906, demolished), which was very much criticised; as well as monuments for North and South America. He was also the author of portrait busts and statues of Victor Hugo, Léo Delibes, Ferdinand Fabre and a large output of classical subjects. He gained the Grand Prix at the Paris Exposition Universelle of 1900.

He taught at Beaux-Arts de Paris, where his notable students included Fanny Rozet.

His portrait bust, sculpted by Ernest Henri Dubois, is at the Musée des Augustins, Toulouse, which also has a considerable series of statuettes and maquettes, or sculptural sketches. His papers are conserved at the historical department of the Archives Nationales.

== Selected works ==
- Velléda (seated figure, 1877) (At the entrance to the Musée des Augustins, Toulouse)
- The Sorrow of Orpheus (1879)
- Diana Surprised at the Bath (1880)
- Cupid (Musée des Augustins, Toulouse)
- Galatea (1884)
- L'Art et la Fortune (1887)
- Nessus and Deianira (1892) (Tuileries Gardens, Paris).
- Perseus and the Gorgon 1890. (Musée des Beaux-Arts de Lyon, Palais Saint-Pierre; Ny Carlsberg Glyptotek, Copenhagen).
- La Cigale (1900)
- Hebe (1909, shown at the Salon des artistes français)
