= Guillaume d'Abbes de Cabrerolles =

French lawyer and Encyclopédiste

Guillaume d’Abbes, baron de Cabrerolles (21 March 1718, Bédarieux – 1 October 1802, Saint-Martin-d’Aumes) was an 18th-century French lawyer, and Encyclopédiste during the Age of Enlightenment.

== Biography ==
Abbes came from an Occitan family of judges. His father was Guillaume Abbes, seigneur de Courbeson (born 1679), his mother Elisabeth de Valery, married since 1717.

On 11 February 1741, Guillaume d’Abbes de Cabrebolles married Marie Jeanne Aphrodise de Gineste in Béziers with whom he had a daughter, Marie Claire Aphrodise d’Abbes de Cabrerolles. Admitted to the bar in 1741, he practised in this capacity from 1749 to 1789 and worked as correcteur à la chambre des comptes de Montpellier.

Abbes de Cabrebolles was a member of the Académie de Béziers. He wrote the article Physiologie for the Encyclopédie by Diderot and d’Alembert.

== Works (selection) ==
- 1745: Relation des inondations arrivées à la ville de Bédarieux en 1745. Reprint (1838)
- 1758: Voyage dans les espaces imaginaires. London,
