= Ferdinand Duviard =

French teacher, writer and Esperantist (1889-1965)

Ferdinand Jean Marie Valentin Duviard (11 June 1889 – 2 February 1965) was a French high school teacher in Cahors, a writer and novelist. He became an Esperantist in 1905, wrote for many publications and was active in Esperanto youth groups. With Charles Pichon (b. 1893) he co-founded Francan Federacion de Junaj Esperantistoj (French Federation of Young Esperantists).

== Life and career ==
Ferdinand Duviard was born in Fontenay-sous-Bois, Val-de-Marne. His parents were Auguste Emile Duviard (1859–1949) and Valentine Clotilde Fabre (1858–1942), the daughter of novelist Ferdinand Fabre (1827–1898). He learned Esperanto at age 16 in 1905, the year of the first Universal Congress of Esperanto at Boulogne-sur-Mer. Duviard edited the magazine Juneco ("Youth") during 1909 and 1910, and he was a member of Lingva Komitato, the guiding committee for the Esperanto language, until shortly after the end of World War I.

In 1910 he married his first wife, Elisabeth Antoinette Adam (1883–1965), by whom he had two sons, Pierre (1911–2001) and Jacques (1915–2000), and a daughter, Hélène (1912–2008). Ferdinand, Elisabeth and their three children lived until November 1915 on rue Molière in La Roche-sur-Yon, before settling in the Paris region of Coulommiers. The writer Dominique Duviard (1940–1983), was a grandson of Ferdinand Duviard; he contributed a preface to a modern reprint of Ferdinand's book Les Cotillons barrés.

The couple divorced in 1924, and he remarried Anna Marie Marsan (1906–1960) the following year. Duvard's fourth child, François Eugène Duviard-Marsan (1926–2007) was later to become Governor of Rotary International and received a knighthood, the Ordre National du Mérite.

Duviard was a brother-in-law of Carlo Bourlet (1866–1913), who died at age 47, and whose "immense merit" was acknowledged by L. L. Zamenhof, the father of Esperanto. Bourlet's wife, Thérèse Marie Adam (1872–1923), was the sister of Duviard's first wife Elisabeth Antoinette Adam.

== Esperanto and World War I ==
Ferdinand Duviard was a registered participant at the 1914 tenth Universal Congress of Esperanto in Paris. The success of this congress – masterfully organized by Carlo Bourlet, and which had 3,759 Esperanto registrants from 50 countries – was to have a significant impact. The congress was cancelled because war was declared on 2 August 1914, the very day the Esperanto Congress was to have begun at the Gaumont Palace.

During the First World War, Esperantists devoted great efforts to the search for soldiers missing in action and prisoners of war. In the January–March 1916 issue of Juneco, an article entitled "The French Press" states: "We find in the newspapers, of which we give names below, press releases on Esperanto and on various services rendered by Esperantists since the war began. We sincerely thank the said newspapers, as well as the Esperantist friends who have submitted these items."

Under the headline "A success of Esperanto," the 9 August 1915, issue of the newspaper La Petite Gironde highlighted the efforts of Esperantists concerning the search for the missing and the results obtained. La France de Bordeaux wrote: "The La Roche-sur-Yon group produced such results that the Nantes group will organize a similar service." Le Temps of 18 August published separate press releases from the La Roche Esperanto group and from the Le Mans Esperanto club on the issue of soldiers missing in action.

== Academic career ==
In 1927 Duviard earned his Doctorat ès Lettres from Aix-Marseille University; his thesis topic was Honoré de Balzac. He launched a productive career of novel-writing and literary criticism with a book on his maternal grandfather, the novelist Ferdinand Fabre, whose description of religious life Pierre Ouvrard compares favourably with that of Émile Zola.

Duviard wrote numerous articles and was much concerned with helping young people. With journalist Charles Pichon, of Saumur, he co-founded the French Federation of Young Esperantists. His name appears in the Enciklopedio de Esperanto published at Budapest in 1933.

Ferdinand Duviard died in La Roche-sur-Yon, Vendée, Pays de la Loire. He was buried at Saint-Gilles-Croix-de-Vie's cemetery in Vendée. The street Chemin Ferdinand Duviard in La Roche-sur-Yon is named in his honour.

== Works ==
=== Books ===
- 1926. Un prédécesseur de Ferdinand Fabre: Balzac romancier clerical dans le Curé de Tours. (Thèse complémentaire présentée à la faculté des lettres de l'université d'Aix-Marseille). Cahors: Impr. Bergon, 55 p.
- 1927. Ferdinand Fabre, 1827–1898. Cahors: Bergon, 349 p.
- 1928. Les Cotillons barrés. Paris: Fasquelle, 188 p. ISBN 978-2-7188-0150-6
- 1930. Le Bonheur (novel). Paris: Fasquelle, 247 p.
- 1932. Les sauvagesses (novel). Paris: Éditions Montaigne, 218 p.
- 1933. Le Lycée Sentimental. Éditions Montaigne, 222 p.
- 1944. La Fille au cotillon barré: Pièce en 4 actes.
- 1947. Anthologie des poètes français, XVè et XVIè siècles, Ferdinand Duviard (ed.). Larousse.
- 1947. Anthologie des poètes français, XVIIè siècle, Ferdinand Duviard (ed.). Larousse.
- 1952. Introduction and notes to Pierre Loti's Pages choisies.
- 1953. Blaise Pascal. Pensées et opuscules: Textes choisis, Ferdinand Duviard (ed.).
- 1954. Anthologie des poètes français, XVIIIè siecle, Ferdinand Duviard (ed.). Larousse.
- 1954. Anthologie des poètes français, XIXè siecle, Ferdinand Duviard (ed.). Larousse.

=== Journal articles ===
- Ferdinand Fabre, Luigi Pirandello, Ferdinand Duviard. "Lettres inédites" in Revue de France, 1 November 1937, p. 38–54.
- Ferdinand Duviard, "Pascal a-t-il plagié Montaigne?" in Revue Universitaire 66 (1957): 146–158.
- Ferdinand Duviard, "À la trace du vrai Montaigne: Montaigne en ménage" in Revue des Sciences Humaines, Fasc. 81 (1956) 5–18.
