= Aumes =

- Commune
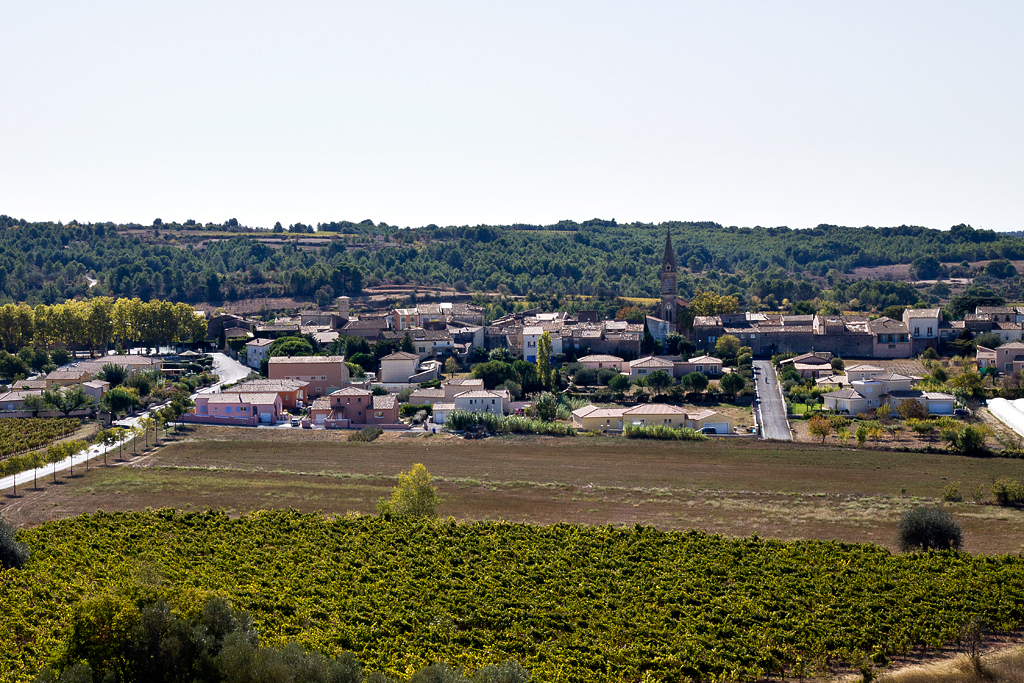
- A general view of Aumes

- Coat of arms
- Location of Aumes
- Location within France Location within Occitanie
- Coordinates: 43°28′01″N 3°27′49″E
- Country: France
- Region: Occitania
- Department: Hérault
- Arrondissement: Béziers
- Canton: Mèze
- Intercommunality: CA Hérault Méditerranée

Government
  - Mayor (2022–2026): Jacques Moncouyoux
- Area^{1}: 7.39 km^{2} (2.85 sq mi)
- Elevation: 80 m (260 ft)
- Highest elevation: 106 m (348 ft)
- Lowest elevation: 6 m (20 ft)
- Population (2023): 498
  - Density: 67.4/km^{2} (175/sq mi)
- Time zone: UTC+01:00 (CET)
  - Summer (DST): UTC+02:00 (CEST)
- INSEE/Postal code: 34017 /34530
- ^{1} French Land Register data, which excludes lakes, ponds, glaciers > 1 km^{2} (0.386 sq mi or 247 acres) and river estuaries.

Aumes (French pronunciation: [om]; Occitan: Aumas) is a commune in the Hérault department in southern France. Guillaume d’Abbes de Cabrebolles (1718–1802), Encyclopédiste, died in Aumes.

== Population ==
Historical population
Year	Pop.	±% p.a.
1968	310	—
1975	305	−0.23%
1982	286	−0.91%
1990	268	−0.81%
1999	310	+1.63%
2007	410	+3.56%
2012	453	+2.01%
2017	483	+1.29%
2023	498	+0.51%
Source: INSEE

== Images ==
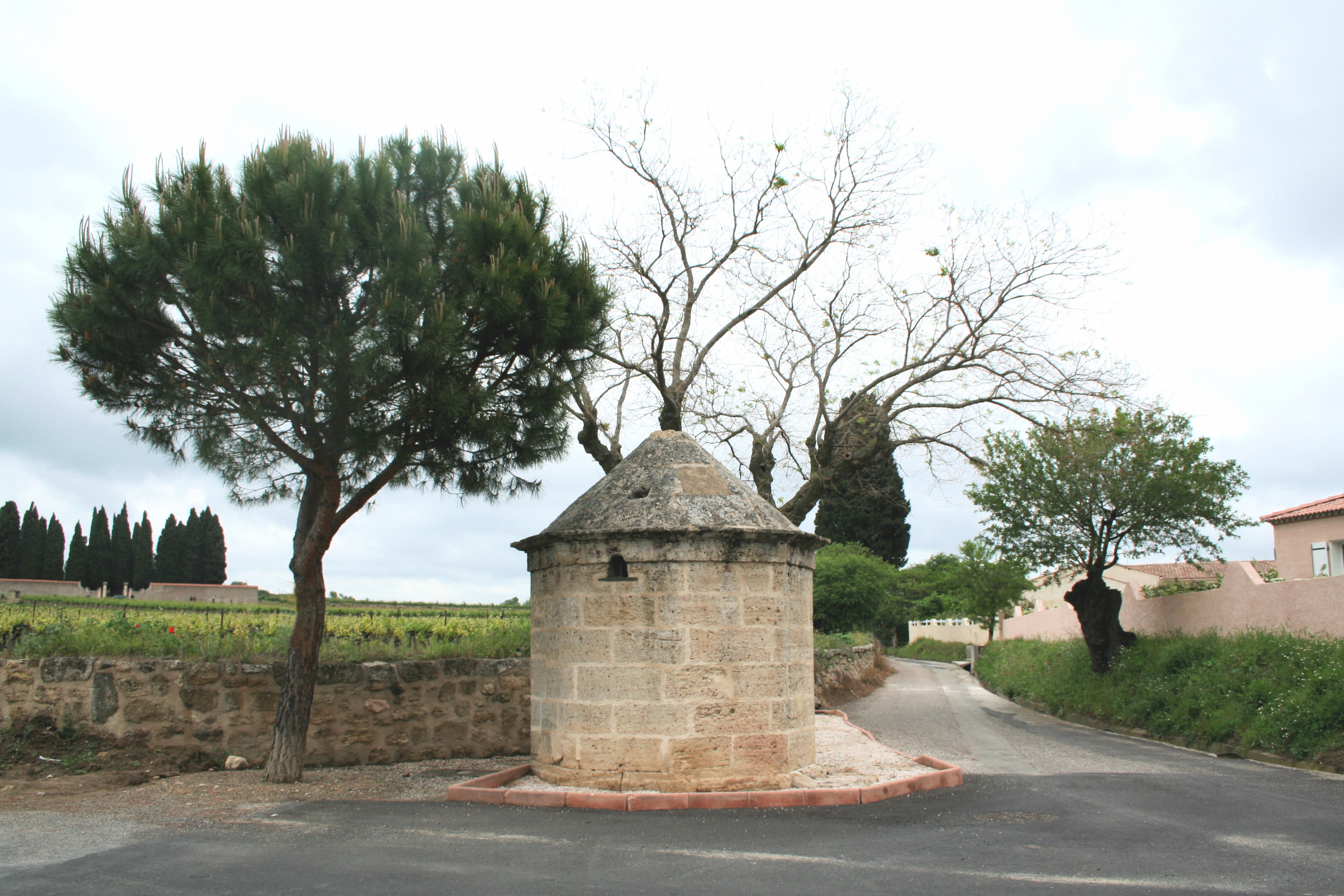
Well

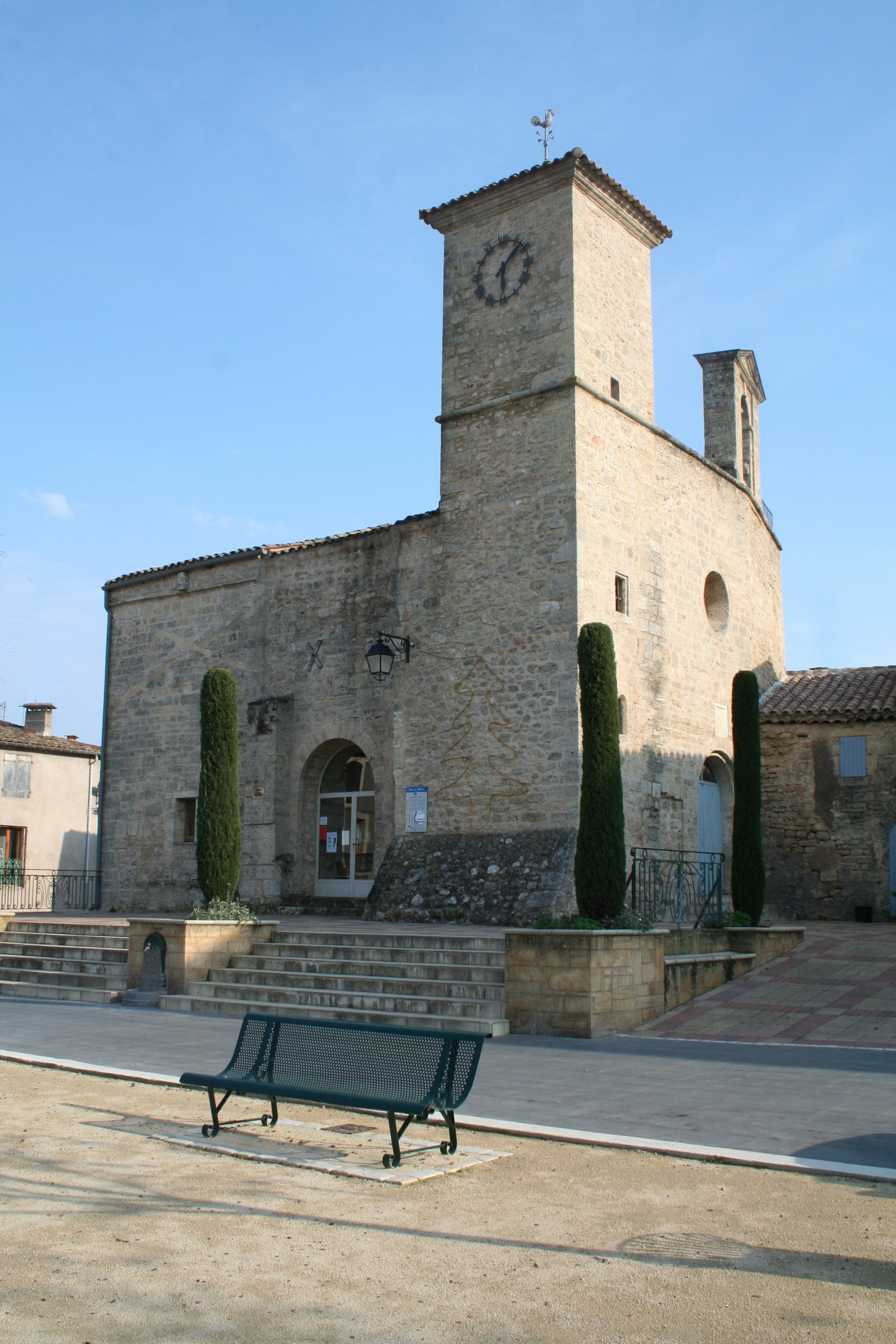
Church St-Pierre

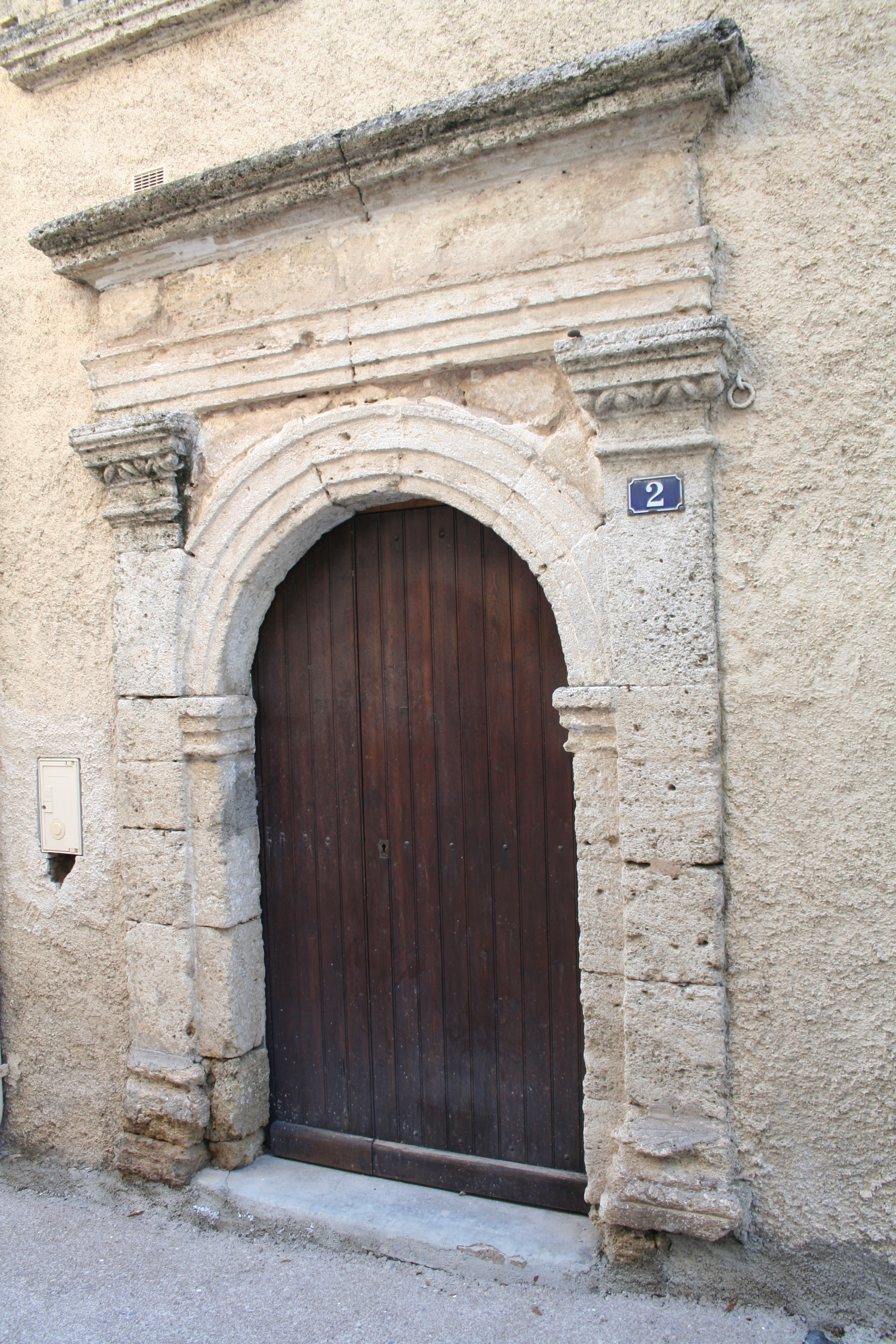
Door of the presbytery.

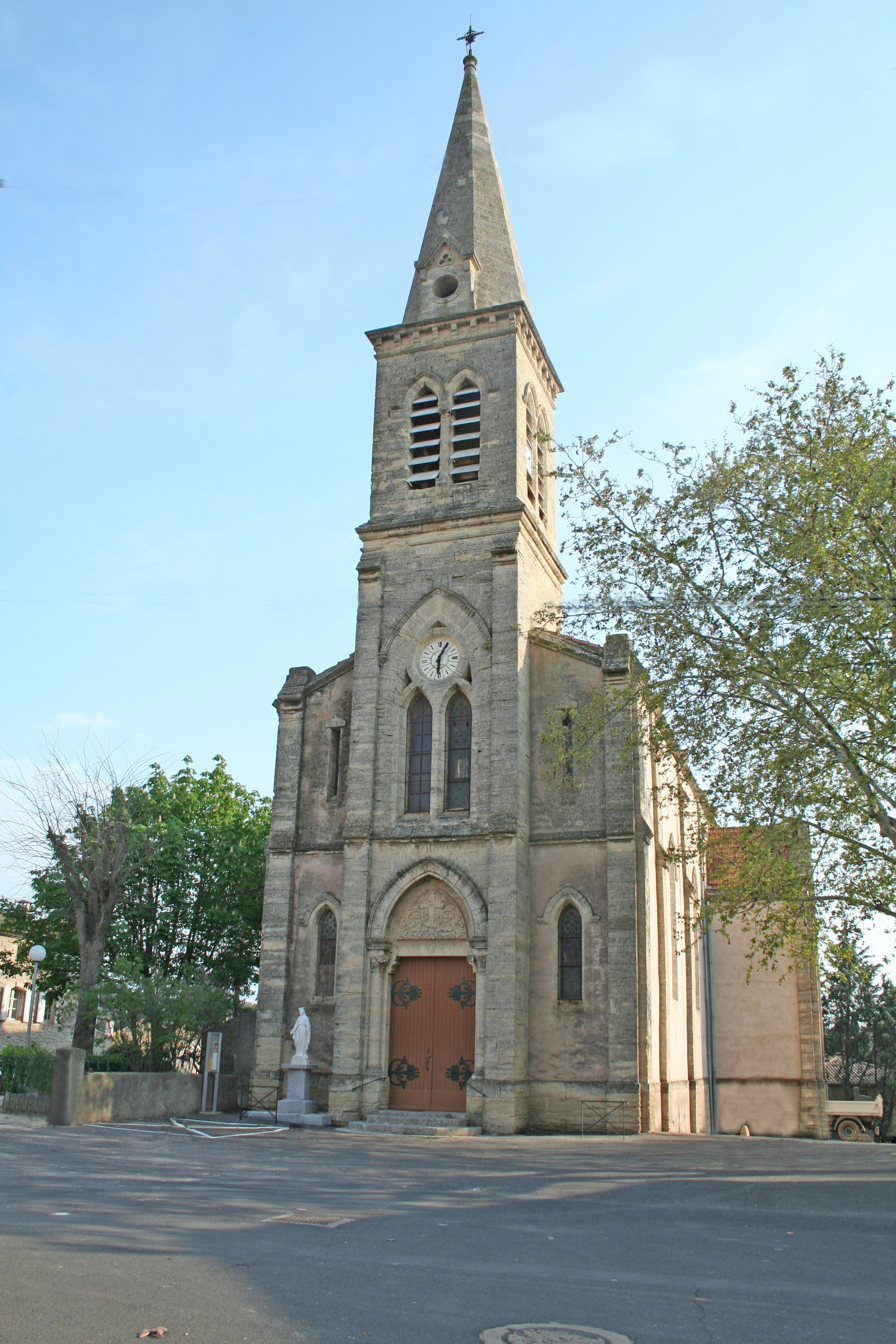
Church of St. Aubin

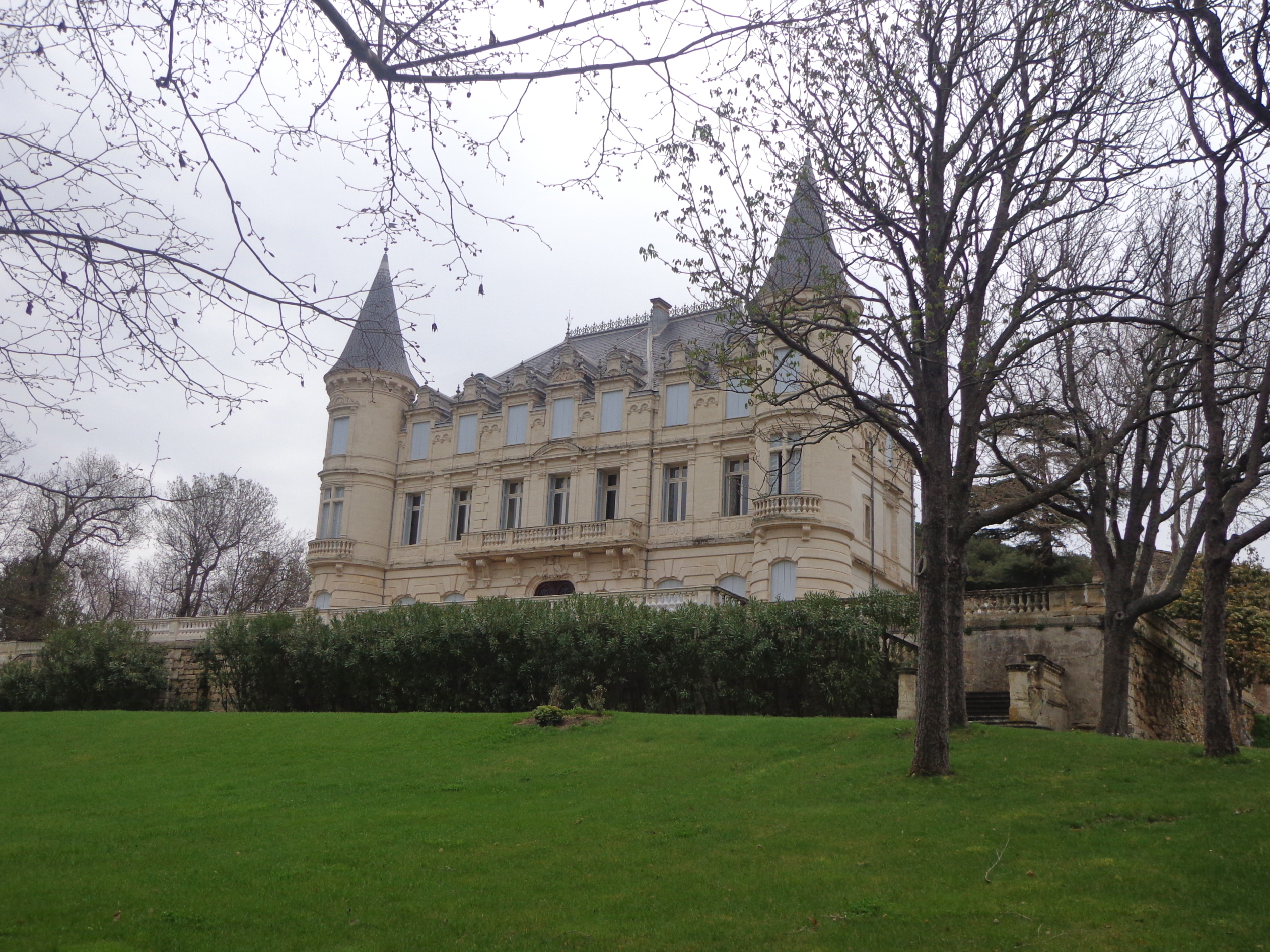
Castle Saint Martin de Graves.

== See also ==
- Communes of the Hérault department
