= Parvus fons =

The Parvus fons (Latin for small beginnings) is a papal bull issued by Pope Clement IV on June 9, 1265, to strengthen the general chapter of the Cistercians. The bull – also known as "Clementina" among Cistercian historians – settled a century of disputes between the mother abbey Cîteaux and the four primary abbeys, which were caused by certain ambiguities in the Carta Caritatis, the Cistercians' constitutional document.

It revoked the fourth chapter of the Carta caritatis and represents an important step in the development of the Order's constitution.

== The search for effective management bodies ==
While ecclesiastical and secular authorities regarded the Abbot of Cîteaux as the "superior general" of the order, the primary abbots, especially the powerful Abbot of Clairvaux, were able to vote against Cîteaux at the general chapters with the support of their filiations. Pope Clement's bull sought to implement the following goals:

- eliminate factions
- reduce the excessive influence of the primary abbots and
- restore the authority of the general chapter.

In the case of serious offenses, especially in matters concerning the deposition of an abbot, it was therefore no longer the visitators who had to make the final decision, but the general chapter alone. According to Parvus fons, the supreme authority and the implementation of the decisions of the general chapter was guaranteed by an advisory body of 25 abbots – called the Definitorium – which consisted of the abbot of Cîteaux and the four primary abbots, plus four further abbots from each primary filiation.

== Historical development ==
The Definitorium ultimately went back to Cistercian origins. Even the later versions of the Carta caritatis speak of a kind of council in Cîteaux; this was intended to settle differences of opinion in the general chapter. The word "Definitors" for these advisors first appears in the Chapter of 1197. From 1223, the Definitorium was already a duly elected, administrative body of the chapter, and this was confirmed (not newly introduced) by the bull. The powers of the body were even restricted by the bull of 1265, in that its proposals depended on the approval of the plenary assembly.

The tensions and disputes between the Abbot of Cîteaux and the four primary abbots around the middle of the 13th century came at the expense of the authority of the general chapter. Controversies related, among other things, to the demand for a monetary contribution for Cîteaux. In 1264, the order was threatened with schism, as parallel assemblies had been held in Cîteaux and Clairvaux: both saw themselves as the legitimate general chapter. The newly elected Pope Clement IV (1265) prevented a split through Parvus fons.

A premiere researcher on Cistercian legislature, Jean-Berthold Mahn, observed in his 1945 book that “in 1265, the Cistercian Order is still far from decadence; however, it shows some signs of division. It still has no need of reform, properly speaking.”

=== Loss of participants in the General Chapter ===
As fewer and fewer chapter fathers took part in the general chapter over time, the 25 definitors gained a numerical majority; their view was soon conflated with the view of the chapter. This development, an aberration, could not have been foreseen when the bull was written. In any case, the definitory remained a useful institution until the end of the 16th century.

=== Influence from the Order of Preachers ===
The Dominican influence on the bull is easily explained by the close connection between the two orders in the first half of the 13th century. Two preacher brothers were members of the papal committee that drafted the new constitution. Moreover, the Cistercian definitorium was a parallel to a committee in the Dominican constitutions of 1220, where definitors played a decisive role as representatives of the individual provinces during the general chapter.

== Literature ==
- Louis Julius Lekai, Ambrosius Schneider (Hrsg.): Geschichte und Wirken der weißen Mönche. Der Orden der Cistercienser. Köln 1958, pp. 35–36.
- Hildegard Brem, Alberich M. Altermatt: Neuerung und Erneuerung. Wichtige Quellentexte aus der Geschichte des Zisterzienserordens vom 12. bis 17. Jahrhundert , Zisterzienserkonvent Langwaden 2003, ISBN 3-934551-74-2
- Pfurischeller (F.). Die Privilegierung des Zisterzienser Ordens im Rahmen der allgemeinen Schutz- und Exemptionsgeschichte vom Anfang bis zur Bulle Parvus fons (1265).
