= Fulgens sicut stella matutina =

1335 papal bull by Pope Benedict XII

Fulgens sicut stella matutina ('Shining like the morning star'; Song of Songs 6:10) is a papal bull issued by Pope Benedict XII in Sorgues on July 12, 1335, to initiate a reform of the Cistercian Order, which had been founded in 1119. The bull prescribed four measures: economic consolidation of the indebted convents, compulsory attendance of the general chapter with the payment of corresponding annual contributions, tightening of discipline within the monastery, and the reorganization of theological studies for monks.

Pope Benedict had been a Cistercian monk and abbot before he became a bishop. The bull is also called Benedictina in reference to the pope.

== Literature ==
- Text of the bull in: Julien Paris, Hugues Séjalon (eds.): Nomasticon Cisterciense. Solesmes 1892, pp. 473–476. In the 1664 edition: pp. 586–614. (online)
- Louis Julius Lekai, Ambrosius Schneider (Hrsg.): Geschichte und Wirken der weißen Mönche. Der Orden der Cistercienser. Köln 1958, S. 37–38.
- Laetitia Boehm: Papst Benedikt XII. (1334–1342) als Förderer der Ordensstudien: Restaurator – Reformator – oder Deformator regularer Lebensform? In: Secundum regulam vivere. Festschrift for Norbert Backmund O. Praem, ed. Gert Melville, Poppe 1978.
