= Nomasticon Cisterciense =

The Nomasticon Cisterciense is a collection of legal documents pertaining to the Cistercian Order. Published in 1664 with Julien Paris as its editor, it presents documents from the first three centuries of Cistercian legislation. The publication was initiated by Cistercian monks of the Strict Observance. An expanded edition was published in 1892 in Solesmes, edited by Father Hugues Séjalon.

== Contents ==
Narrative texts about the origins of the Cistercian movement open the book. They describe the early history, the fervor of the monks, their way of life and biographical details about the monks who wrote the early legislation. The collection proper consists of three parts. The first contains the Rule of St. Benedict, the Carta Caritatis, the Usus Antiquiores and several resolutions approved by the General Chapter. The second contains, among others, deliberations among abbots under Pope Urban IV. and a text by Pope Clement IV. regarding the interpretation of the Carta Caritatis. The third section contains the reform bull Benedictina and papal missives to various Cistercian General Chapters.

== Purpose ==
The Nomasticon was intended to strengthen the position of the Strict Observance in their endeavor to "reform" the Cistercian Order according to a literal interpretation of the Rule of St. Benedict. The editor, Julien Paris, who taught at the University of Paris and was abbot of Foucarmont Abbey, was himself a supporter of the Strict Observance. He sought to return to a way of life he believed to have been lived by Cistercians in the first generations after the movement began in 1098. He writes in his foreword that the order's reputation for sanctity was based on the strict adherence to their early legislation. He perceived many of the monks of his day, among them those who belonged to the Common Observance, to be decadent. The Nomasticon was meant to give them the rules and regulations that would lead to sanctity.

== Role in research ==
In both the first edition and that of 1892, the Nomasticon has served as an important collection of sources for Cistercian research. Scholars of recent generations have noted that the medieval sources in the book are not edited according to contemporary standards. Many more sources have become available since it was published. The edition published by Séjalon (1892) is the most recent.

== Literature ==
- Julien Paris, Hugues Séjalon (eds.): Nomasticon Cisterciense seu antiquiores Ordinis Cistercienses constitutiones. Typographeum Sancti Petri, Solesmis 1892.
- Julien Paris (ed.): Nomasticon Cisterciense seu antiquiores Ordinis Cistercienses constitutiones. Alliot, Parisiis 1664. Online at the Bavarian State Library.
- David Bell, The Library of the Abbey of La Trappe. A Study of its History from the Twelfth Century to the French Revolution, with an annotated edition of the 1752 catalogue (Turnhout: Brepols 2014), p. 510.
- Gilbert M. Wellstein: Zum Nomasticon Cisterciense. In: Cistercienser-Chronik 21 (1909), pp. 21-22.
