= Carta Caritatis =

Constitutional document of the Cistercian Order

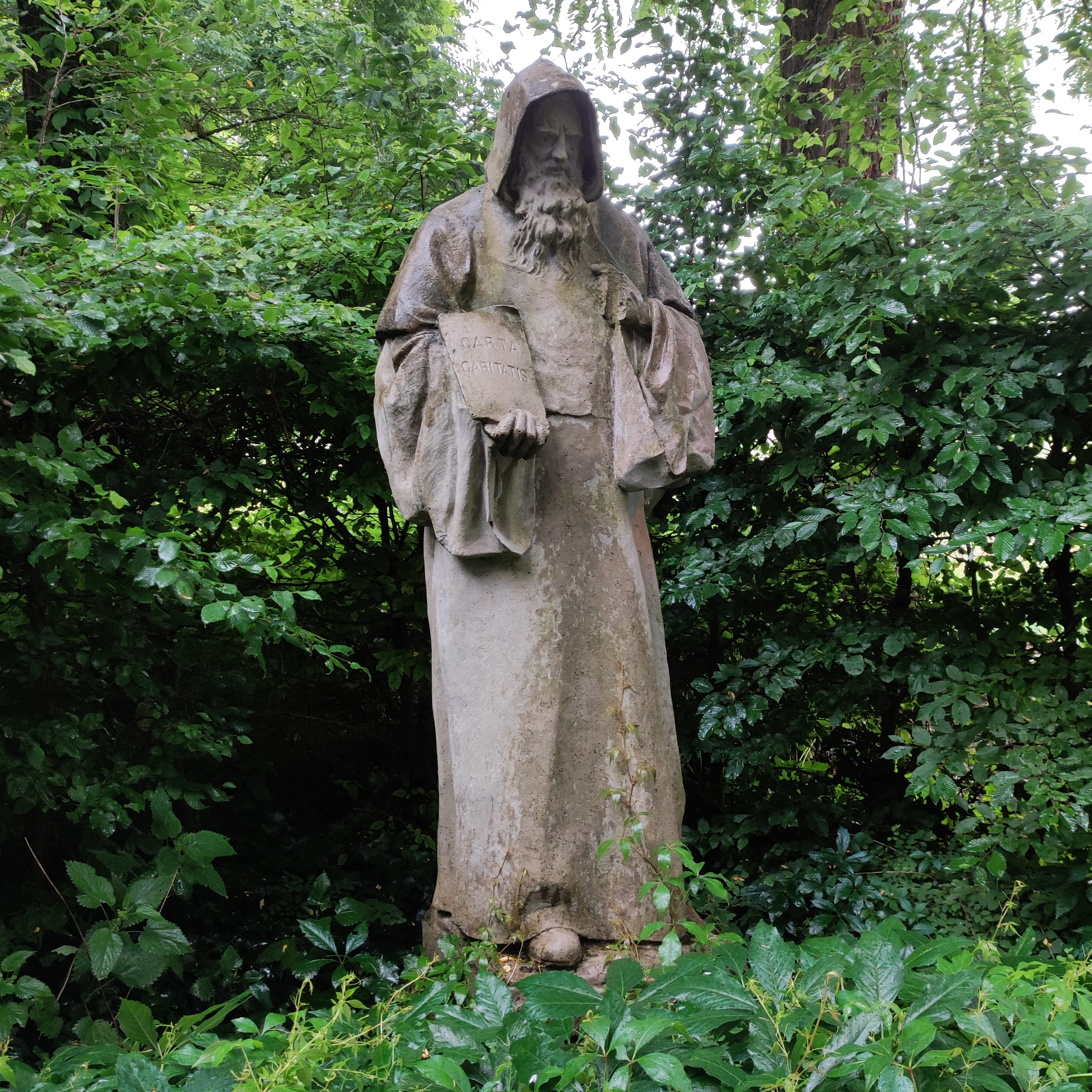
Statue of Stephen Harding with Carta Caritatis in Cîteaux

Carta Caritatis (transl. Charter of Charity) is the constitution of the Cistercian Order. The document, approbated in 1119 by Pope Calixtus II, regulates relations among the Cistercian abbeys. The text was continually revised and adapted until 1155. In terms of canon law, the Carta Caritatis is a document of unprecedented significance, since it introduced the systematic regulations that made a group of monks at Cîteaux into one of the most important religious orders in the High Middle Ages. It is held in high esteem as a legal monument of great influence.

== Name ==
The name Carta Caritatis is often misunderstood as referring to mystical unions or the ties of friendship in the monastic community. In fact, the text is quite technical and concerned with administrative matters. The "charity" in the title comes from the fact that when new monasteries were founded, they were not forced to make financial contributions to the abbeys that founded them. Such payments had caused problems in the monastic family of Cluny which preceded the Cistercian movement.

== Background ==
The Carta Caritas is generally attributed to Stephen Harding, the third abbot of Citeaux. Harding arrived at Molesme Abbey on his way back from a pilgrimage to Rome. He joined the community under its founder, Robert of Molesme. In 1098, Robert left Molesme to found Cîteaux Abbey. Around 1100 Pope Urban II asked Robert to return to Molesme and institute reform of the community. At Citeaux, Robert was succeeded as abbot by Alberic, and Harding served as prior. Stephen succeeded alberic, becoming the third abbot of Cîteaux.

== Content ==
The Carta orders relations about several Cistercian monasteries, arranging them according to filiation, thus conceptualizing them as a series of mother and daughter abbeys in one big family tree. Its success is based on two main legislative and administrative methods: frequent Visitation and an annual General Chapter in Cîteaux, the mother abbey for all the Cistercian world. The statute also regulates the following matters:

- daughter abbeys must not be required to make payments of any sort to their mother houses,
- rites, liturgical books and monastic observances are to be the same in all houses,
- the interpretation of the Rule of St. Benedict is to follow the precedent set at Cîteaux,
- graves and funeral monuments for benefactors are forbidden,
- ceremonial precedent, seating order for meetings of several abbots,
- ceremonial rites for making the monastic vows,
- canonical visitation,
- new foundations,
- procedure at General Chapter,
- abbatial elections or sedesvacancy,
- impeachment of abbots,
- measures for disciplining wayward abbots,
- alternate sites for the General Chapter and
- the monastic ideal of stability of place (stabilitas loci).

The Carta Caritatis passage perhaps most widely quoted is: una caritate, una regula, similibusque vivamus moribus (may we all live in one love, under one rule and with like customs). This statement, as indeed most of the statute's content, plays only a symbolic role in the Cistercian Order of our day. Since the system of filiation gave way to a network of congregations in the Late Middle Ages, the famous system of filiation no longer exists, making the medieval statutes impossible to implement.

== Reception ==
Beyond its success within the Cistercian Order, the Carta proved influential at the Fourth Lateran Council. Annual general chapters were portrayed there as exemplary and made obligatory for new monastic orders, which were multiplying rapidly at the time. Later popes continued to hold the Carta in high esteem, one of them calling it a treasure trove of virtues.

== Versions ==
For centuries, scholars have argued about whether or not Stephen Harding was the Carta's author. As a constitution it was certainly a collaborative effort, as almost all constitutional texts are. Two important developments in the twentieth century (Father Tiburtius Hümpfner's discovery of a version of the Summa Carta Caritatis in 1932 and Auguste Trilhe's find of the Carta Caritatis prior in 1939) have fueled a vast number of publications and historiographical disputes. The Charter enjoys much attention from legal historians studying Western Christianity. Current research speaks of a total of three versions:

- Carta Caritatis prior
- Summa Cartae Caritatis
- Carta Caritatis posterior
