= Alberic of Cîteaux =

French monk, abbot and saint (died 1109)

Saint Alberic of Cîteaux O.Cist.
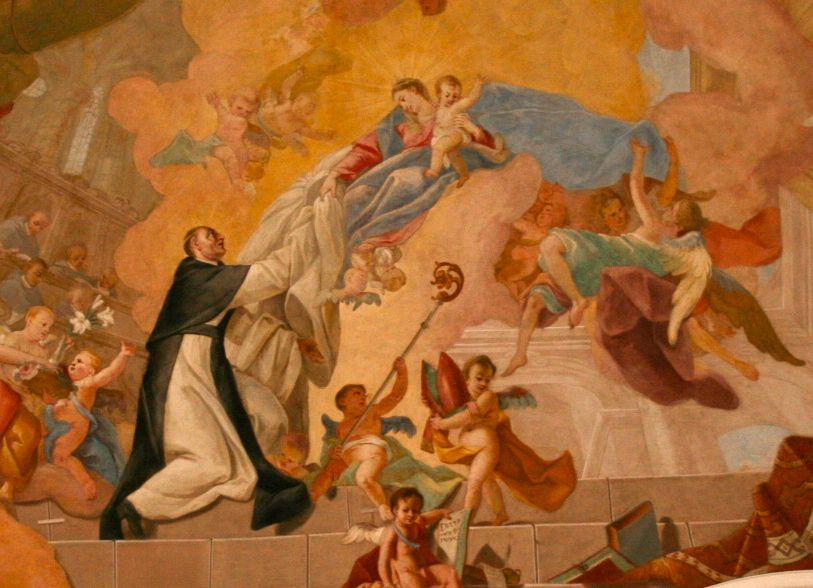
- The Virgin Mary, patroness of the Order, gives Alberic the white Cistercian cowl

Monk and priest
- Died: 26 January 1109; Abbey of Cîteaux, Duchy of Burgundy
- Venerated in: Catholic Church (Cistercian Order)
- Feast: 26 January

Alberic of Cîteaux (died 26 January 1109), sometimes known as Aubrey of Cîteaux, was a French monk and abbot, one of the founders of the Cistercian Order. He is now honored as a saint.

== Life ==
Alberic was a hermit in the forest of Collan in France who, along with five other hermits, invited Abbot Robert of Molesme to begin a new monastery with them that would operate under the Rule of St. Benedict. Robert led these hermits to the forest of Molesme and in 1075 established a religious settlement, the monastery Molesme Abbey. Robert served as the first abbot, and Alberic as the prior. However, as the settlement's fame grew, gifts came in, and the wealth attracted new monks more lax in their observance of the rule. The Molesme community was divided, and the monks opposed Robert and Alberic. Robert twice left the monastery to live as a hermit, and twice the pope ordered him back to his community. During one of Robert's absences, the brothers imprisoned Alberic so that they might have their way.

The stricter group left Molesme for Cîteaux. Initially, Robert was Abbot of Cîteaux with Alberic serving as prior. However, the monks of Molesme petitioned Pope Urban II that Robert return to them and vowed obedience to the Rule of St. Benedict. In 1100, Robert left for Molesme, and Alberic became the new abbot at Cîteaux.

Alberic is credited with attaining the Cistercian Order's legal foundation. Pope Paschal II granted this legitimacy with his Bull Desiderium quod (around 1100). Alberic also decided to move the monastery's buildings a kilometer north and to initiate construction of the first abbey church. The Church was consecrated less than six years later. Alberic also introduced the use of the white Cistercian cowl. It was given to him for the monks, according to legend, by the Virgin Mary as they were at choir praying vigils. Accordingly, the white cowl is one of Alberic's attributes in hagiographical paintings.

Alberic and his religious at Cîteaux established the exact observance of the Rule of St. Benedict. To better observe the rule regarding the Divine Office day and night, the monks associated with themselves lay brothers, to be chiefly occupied with the manual labor and material affairs of the order.

Alberic's feast day, together with that of Robert of Molesme and Stephen Harding, is celebrated on 26 January.

== Sources ==
- Attwater, Donald and John, Catherine Rachel John, 1993: The Penguin Dictionary of Saints. 3rd edition. New York: Penguin Books ISBN 0-14-051312-4
