= Cistercians =

Catholic religious order

Order of Cistercians
- (Sacer) Ordo Cisterciensis
- Coat of arms of the Cistercians
- Abbreviation: OCist or SOCist
- Formation: 1098; 928 years ago
- Founder: Bernard of Clairvaux; Robert of Molesme, Stephen Harding, and Alberic of Cîteaux
- Founded at: Cîteaux Abbey
- Type: Catholic religious order
- Headquarters: Piazza del Tempio di Diana, 14; Rome, Italy
- Abbot General: Mauro-Giuseppe Lepori
- Parent organization: Catholic Church
- Website: www.ocist.org

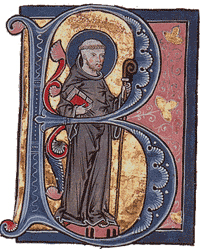
St. Bernard of Clairvaux, one of the most influential early Cistercians, seen here depicted in a historiated initial

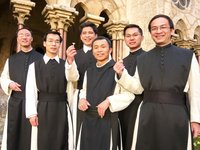
Vietnamese Cistercian monks standing in a cloister and wearing their religious habits

The Cistercians (/sɪˈstɜːrʃənz/), or the Order of Cistercians (Latin: (Sacer) Ordo Cisterciensis, abbreviated as OCist or SOCist), are a Catholic religious order of monks and nuns that branched off from the Benedictines and follow the Rule of Saint Benedict, as well as the contributions of the highly influential Bernard of Clairvaux, known as the Latin Rule. They are also known as Bernardines, after Saint Bernard, or as White Monks, in reference to the colour of their cowl, as opposed to the black cowl worn by Benedictines.

The term Cistercian derives from Cistercium, the Latin name for the locale of Cîteaux, near Dijon in eastern France. It was here that a group of Benedictine monks from the monastery of Molesme founded Cîteaux Abbey in 1098. The first three abbots were Robert of Molesme, Alberic of Cîteaux and Stephen Harding. Bernard helped launch a new era when he entered the monastery in the early 1110s with 30 companions. By the end of the 12th century, the order had spread throughout most of Europe.

The keynote of Cistercian life was a return to literal observance of the Benedictine Rule. The reform-minded monks tried to live monastic life as they thought it had been in Benedict's time; at various points they went beyond it in austerity. They returned to manual labour, especially agricultural work in the fields. The Cistercians made major contributions to culture and technology: Cistercian architecture has been recognized as a notable form of medieval architecture, and the Cistercians were the main force of technological diffusion in fields such as agriculture and hydraulic engineering.

Over the centuries, education and scholarship came to dominate the life of many monasteries. A reform movement seeking a simpler lifestyle began in 17th-century France at La Trappe Abbey, and became known as the Trappists. They were eventually consolidated in 1892 into a new order called the Order of Cistercians of the Strict Observance, abbreviated as OCSO. The Cistercians who remained within the Order of Cistercians are called the Cistercians of the Common Observance (OCist).

Apart from Catholicism, Cistercian spirituality is present in certain monastic houses of Evangelical Lutheranism and Anglicanism.

== Cistercian practices ==
The abbot general is the leader of the "administrative machinery" of a Cistercian order.

The burial practices for Cistercian monks involve complex rituals, and monks may be buried with or without shrouds.

Cistercian monks and nuns cultivate solitude and silence. However, contrary to some popular perceptions, Cistercians do not take a vow of silence. Silence assumes a variety of expressions in Cistercian life and practice.

== Origins and early expansion ==
=== Foundation ===
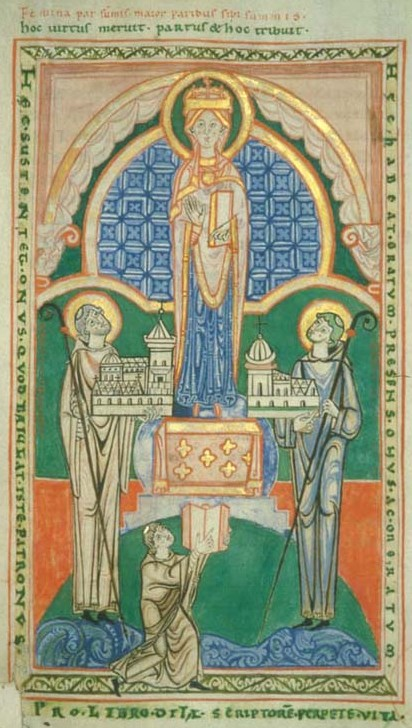
An illumination of Stephen Harding (right) presenting a model of his church to the Blessed Virgin Mary (Municipal Library, Dijon). Cîteaux, c. 1125.

In 1098, a Benedictine abbot, Robert of Molesme, left Molesme Abbey in Burgundy with around 20 supporters, who felt that the Cluniac communities had abandoned the rigours and simplicity of the Rule of St. Benedict. Chief among Robert's followers included Alberic, a former hermit from the nearby forest of Colan, and Stephen Harding, a young monk from England. Stephen had experienced the monastic traditions of the Camaldolese and Vallombrosians before joining Molesme Abbey.

On 21 March 1098, Robert's small group acquired a plot of marshland just south of Dijon called Cîteaux (Latin: "Cistercium". Cisteaux means reeds in Old French), given to them expressly for the purpose of founding their Novum Monasterium. During the first year, the monks set about constructing lodging areas and farming the lands of Cîteaux, making use of a nearby chapel for Mass. In Robert's absence from Molesme, however, the abbey had gone into decline, and Pope Urban II, a former Cluniac monk, ordered him to return.

The remaining monks of Cîteaux elected Alberic as their abbot, under whose leadership the abbey would find its grounding. Robert had been the idealist of the order, and Alberic was their builder. Upon assuming the role of abbot, Alberic moved the site of the fledgling community near a brook a short distance away from the original site. Alberic discontinued the use of Benedictine black garments in the abbey and clothed the monks in white habits of undyed wool. Alberic forged an alliance with the Dukes of Burgundy, working out a deal with Duke Odo I of Burgundy concerning the donation of a vineyard (Meursault) as well as materials for building the abbey church, which was consecrated on 16 November 1106 by the Bishop of Chalon sur Saône.

On 26 January 1108, Alberic died and was succeeded by Stephen Harding.

==== Cistercian reform ====
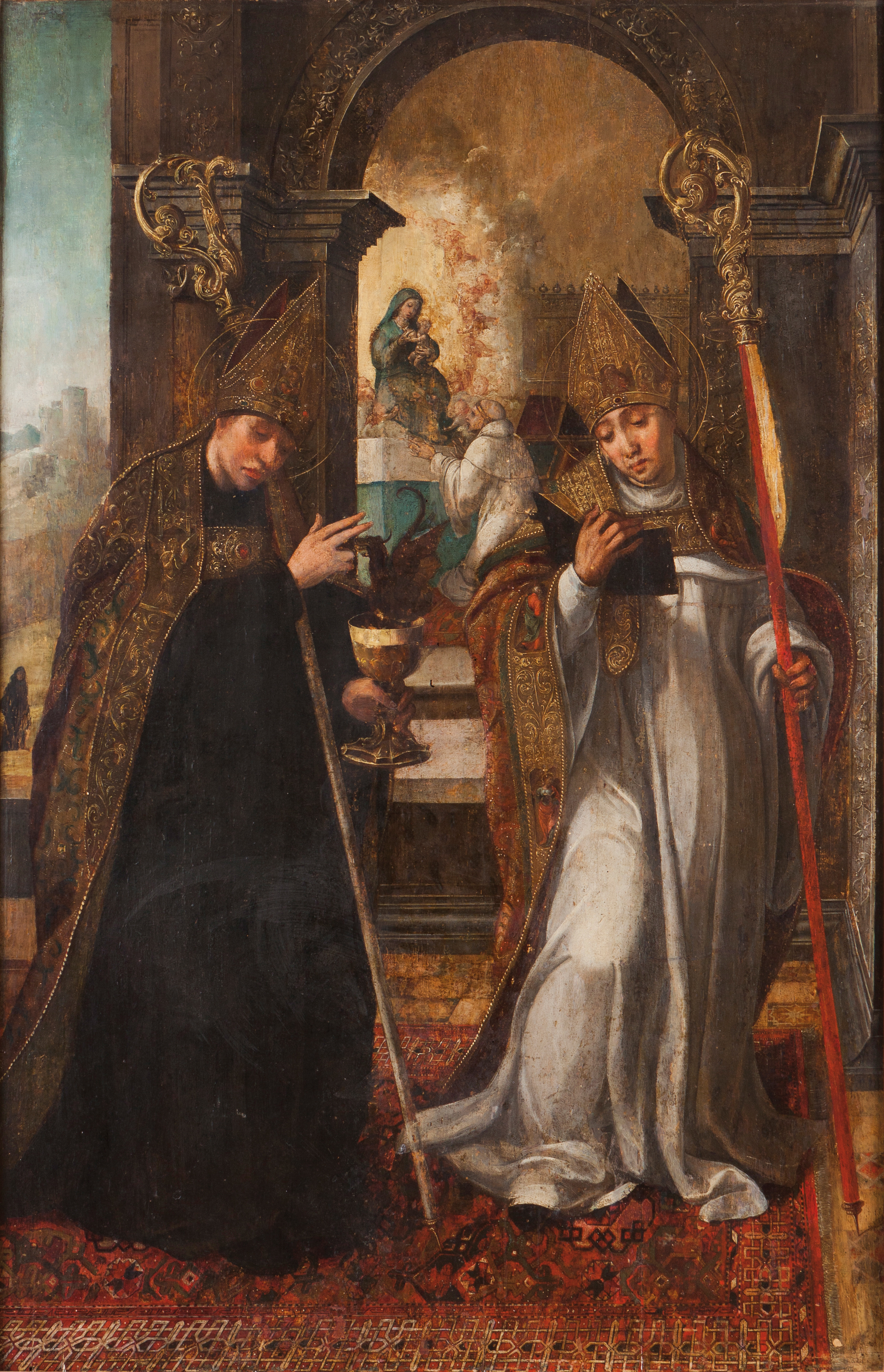
Saint Benedict and Saint Bernard (1542), by Diogo de Contreiras.

Harding framed the original version of the Cistercian constitution, soon to be called the Carta Caritatis (Charter of Charity). Although it was revised on several occasions to meet contemporary needs, from the outset it emphasised a simple life of work, love, prayer and self-denial. The Cistercians soon came to distinguish themselves from Benedictines by wearing white or grey tunics instead of black; white habits are common for reform movements. Much of Cistercian reform took place against the rivalry with the famous Benedictine abbey of Cluny, where wealth and excess were said to have set in.

Harding acquired land for the abbey to develop to ensure its survival and ethic. As to grants of land, the order would normally accept only undeveloped land, which the monks then developed by their own labour. For this they developed over time a very large component of uneducated lay brothers known as conversi. In some cases, the order accepted developed land and relocated the serfs elsewhere.

===== Charter of Charity =====
The outlines of the Cistercian reform were adumbrated by Alberic, but it received its final form in the Carta caritatis (Charter of Charity), which was the defining guide on how the reform was to be lived. This document governed the relations between the various houses of the Cistercian order, and exercised a great influence also upon the future course of western monachism. From one point of view, it may be regarded as a compromise between the primitive Benedictine system, in which each abbey was autonomous and isolated, and the centralization of Cluny.

The Cistercians maintained the independence of individual houses: each abbey had its own abbot, elected by its own monks, and its own property and finances administered without outside interference. On the other hand, all the abbeys were subjected to the General Chapter, the constitutional body which exercised vigilance over the order. Made up of all the abbots, the General Chapter met annually in mid-September at Cîteaux. Attendance was compulsory, with the abbot of Cîteaux presiding. He was to enforce conformity to Cîteaux in all details of monastic observance, liturgy, and customs. Cîteaux was always to be the model to which all the other houses had to conform.

=== Cistercian nuns ===
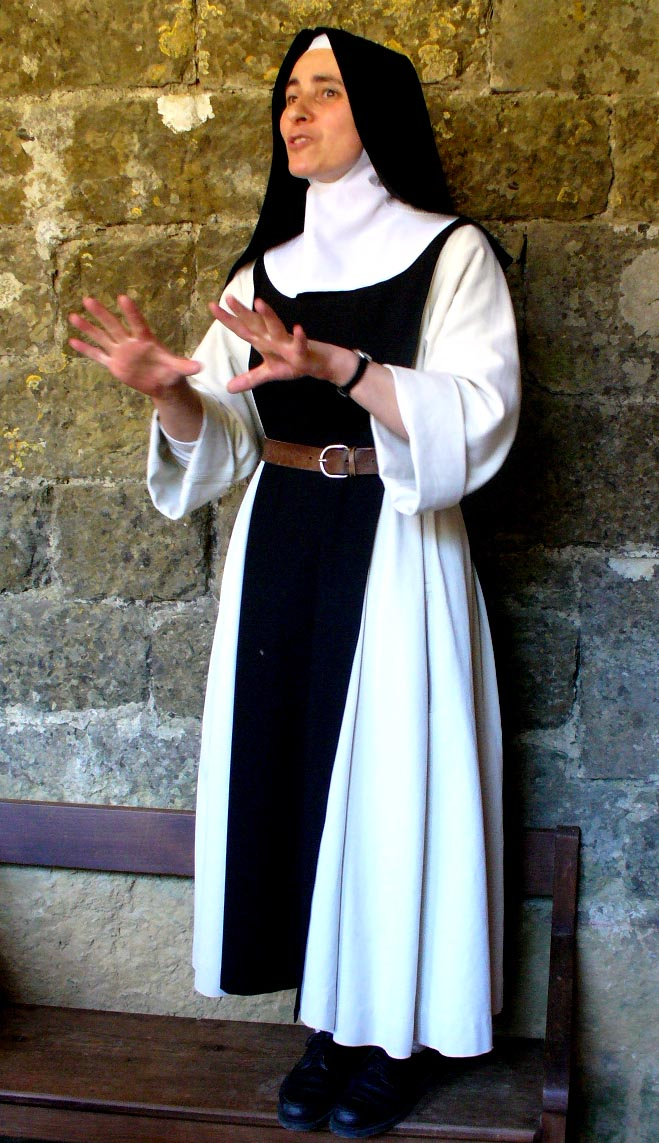
Prioress of Rieunette priory in France.

The first community of Cistercian nuns, Tart, was founded 1125 in the Diocese of Langres. Their number rose so quickly in the course of the next century that the historian and cardinal Jacques de Vitry wrote: "Cistercian nunneries multiplied like stars in the sky." At their most populous point, there may have been over 900 women's monasteries, but not all were officially integrated into the order. One of the best-known Cistercian women's communities was the Abbey of Port-Royal, associated with the Jansenist controversy. In Spain and France, a number of Cistercian abbesses had extraordinary privileges and authority over priests.

== International expansion ==
In the 1130s and 1140s, the Cistercians expanded into "an order of immense size" by incorporating independent religious communities.

=== France ===
In 1113, Bernard joined the Cîteaux monastery along with 35 relatives and friends. Bernard's charisma greatly expanded the size of the order. In 1115, Count Hugh of Champagne gifted the order a tract of forested land located forty miles east of Troyes. At the age of 25, Bernard founded the Abbey of Clairvaux with twelve other monks. At this time, Cîteaux had four daughter houses: Pontigny, Morimond, La Ferté and Clairvaux.

The most foundations made by any Cistercian monastery came from Clairvaux.

=== Austria ===
Rein Abbey was founded in 1129 from Ebrach Abbey in Bavaria, which had been founded from Morimond Abbey in France. In 1129 Margrave Leopold the Strong of Styria granted the Bavarian monks an area of land just north of what is today the provincial capital Graz, where they founded Rein Abbey. At the time, it was the 38th Cistercian monastery founded; as of 2024, it is the oldest surviving Cistercian house in the world. In 1133, Heiligenkreuz Abbey was founded near Vienna by Morimond monks; it is (as of 2024) the largest men's abbey in Europe.

=== Hungary ===
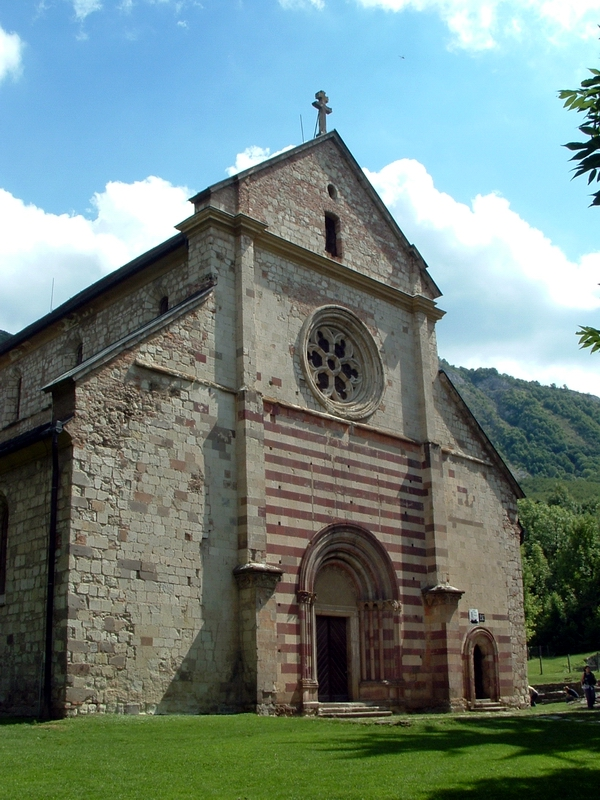
Cistercian abbey in Bélapátfalva, Hungary

The Cistercian Order reached the Kingdom of Hungary exceptionally early, during the lifetime of Saint Bernard of Clairvaux, as part of the initial wave of international expansion. The first Hungarian house, Cikádor Abbey (near modern-day Bátaszék), was founded in 1142 as a daughter house of Heiligenkreuz Abbey in Austria. Monastic expansion accelerated significantly during the late 12th century under the direct patronage of King Béla III (r. 1172–1196). Seeking to modernize his administration and align Hungary with Western European models, Béla III granted the Cistercians extensive judicial and fiscal privileges equivalent to those enjoyed by houses in France. He invited monks directly from the primary French mother houses—particularly Clairvaux, Acey, and Pontigny—leading to the foundation of major royal abbeys, including Zirc Abbey (1182), Pilis Abbey (1184), Pásztó Abbey (1191), and Szentgotthárd Abbey (1183). By the early 13th century, the network had grown to include between 22 and 25 monasteries across the medieval kingdom. The Cistercians played a foundational role in introducing Western European cultural and technological developments to medieval Hungary. Architecturally, their construction projects marked the arrival of early Gothic and late Romanesque styles in East-Central Europe. The stonemasonry techniques and structural plans developed at places like Pilis Abbey heavily influenced the construction of royal palaces and cathedrals, such as the royal castle complex at Esztergom. Economically, the Hungarian abbeys operated complex manorial estates. While traditional historiography emphasized their role in agricultural internal colonization, modern research by scholars such as Beatrix Romhányi indicates they primarily utilized existing regional infrastructure to establish trade and market networks, frequently positioning their monasteries along major international transport routes. They also played a central role in diplomacy and royal representation; Egres Abbey (founded in 1179 as a daughter house of Pontigny) serves as a prime example, housing a significant royal library and becoming the burial site of King Andrew II and his queen, Yolanda of Courtenay. The prosperity of the order was abruptly halted by geopolitical disruptions. Although several abbeys survived the initial Mongol invasion of 1241–1242 (such as Bélapátfalva Abbey, which completed its landmark three-naved basilica shortly after the incursion), the expansion of the Ottoman Empire in the 16th century proved fatal. Following the Battle of Mohács in 1526, the expanding Ottoman occupation zone swallowed the majority of Cistercian territories. Monasteries were systematically looted, abandoned, or repurposed as military fortifications, leading to the complete extinction of medieval Cistercian monastic life in Hungary by the late 16th century. The order was revitalized in the 18th century under Habsburg rule following the expulsion of the Ottomans. Heinrichau Abbey in Silesia acquired the rights to the ruined Zirc Abbey, sending German monks to rebuild the complex in the Baroque style. In 1814, the Hungarian Cistercian congregation was formally unified under the Abbot of Zirc and underwent a functional shift. In response to imperial decrees, the order assumed management of several elite secondary prep schools (gimnáziums) in cities such as Eger, Pécs, Székesfehérvár and Budapest, making education their primary pastoral mission. Despite total suppression and asset seizure under the communist regime in 1950, the order operated underground, survived, and was legally re-established in 1989 following the fall of the Iron Curtain.

=== Britain ===
The order entrusted the oversight of the English, Welsh and (intermittently) Irish abbeys to two or more abbots-commissary, thereby abrogating the famous Cistercian system of filiation: not the mother abbeys, but the abbots-commisary had full powers of visitation. This variation on the original vertical descent of authority produced "a system of centralized national control" much closer to that of the Premonstratensians or mendicants. The first Cistercian house to be established in Britain, a monastery at Waverley Abbey, Surrey, was founded by William Gifford, Bishop of Winchester in 1128. It was founded with 12 monks and an abbot from L'Aumône Abbey, in the South of France. By 1187 there were 70 monks and 120 lay brothers in residence.

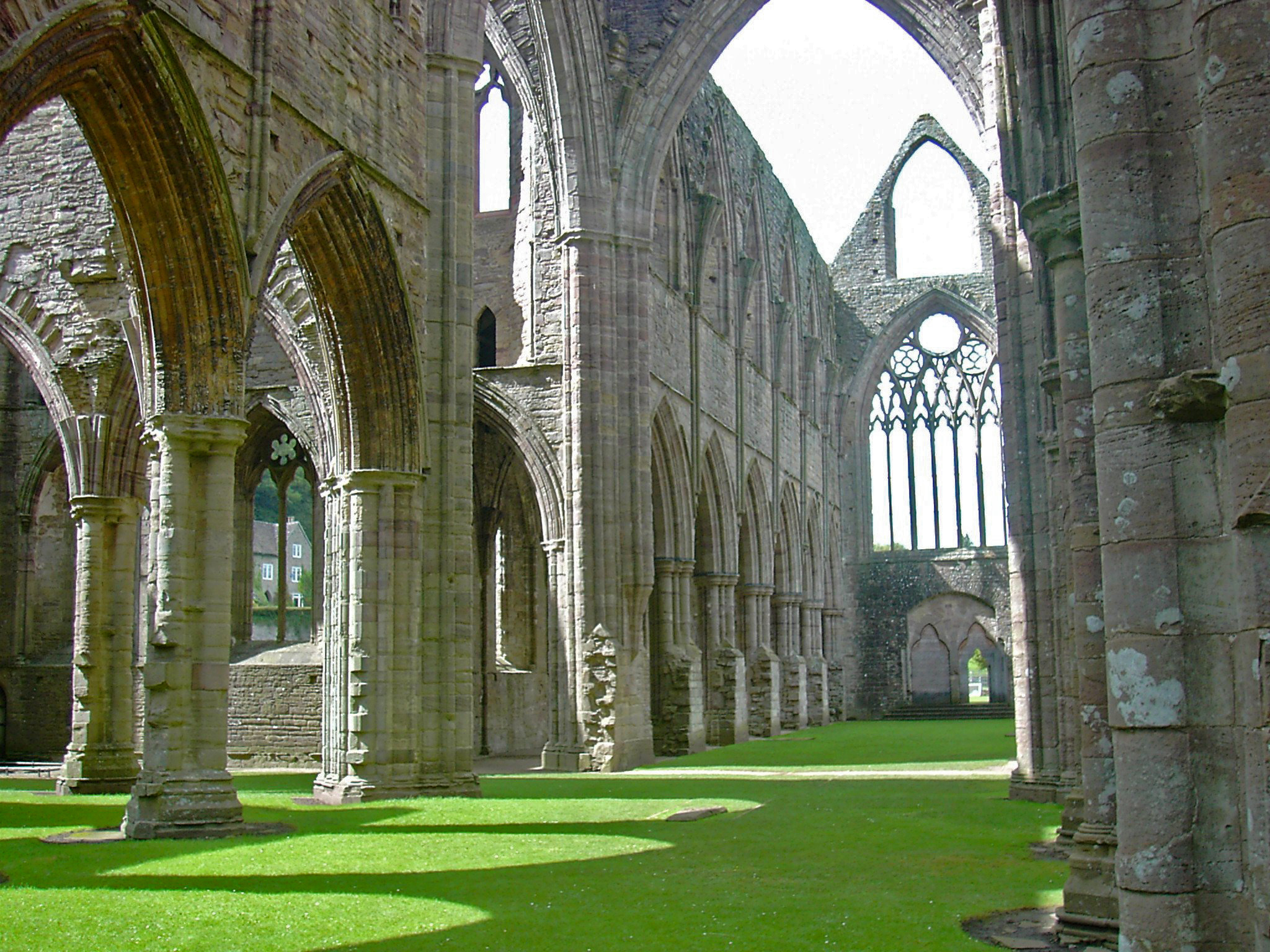
Tintern Abbey, founded in 1131

Thirteen Cistercian monasteries, all in remote locations, were founded in Wales between 1131 and 1226. The first of these was Tintern Abbey, which was sited in a remote river valley, and depended largely on its agricultural and pastoral activities for survival. Other abbeys, such as at Neath, Strata Florida, Conwy and Valle Crucis became among the most hallowed names in the history of religion in medieval Wales. Their austere discipline seemed to echo the ideals of the Celtic saints, and the emphasis on pastoral farming fit well into the Welsh stock-rearing economy. In Bedfordshire Woburn Abbey was founded in 1145, remodeled into a Neo-Palladian villa in the 1800s.

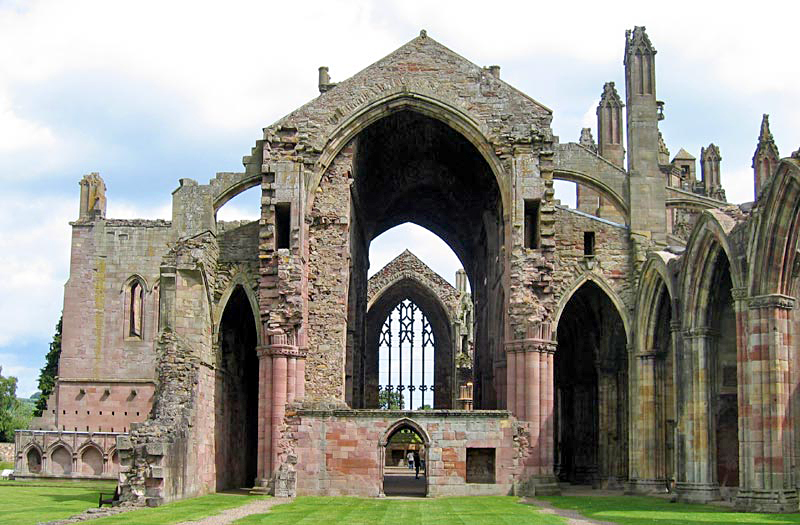
The ruins of Melrose Abbey

In Yorkshire, Rievaulx Abbey was founded from Clairvaux in 1131, on a small, isolated property donated by Walter Espec, with the support of Thurstan, Archbishop of York. By 1143, three hundred monks had entered Rievaulx, including the famous St Ælred. It was from Rievaulx that a foundation was made at Melrose, which became the earliest Cistercian monastery in Scotland. Located in Roxburghshire, it was built in 1136 by King David I of Scotland, and completed in less than ten years. Another important offshoot of Rievaulx was Revesby Abbey in Lincolnshire.

Fountains Abbey was founded in 1132 by discontented Benedictine monks from St. Mary's Abbey, York, who desired a return to the austere Rule of St Benedict. After many struggles and great hardships, St Bernard agreed to send a monk from Clairvaux to instruct them, and in the end they prospered. Already by 1152, Fountains had many offshoots, including Newminster Abbey (1137) and Meaux Abbey (1151).

=== Germany ===
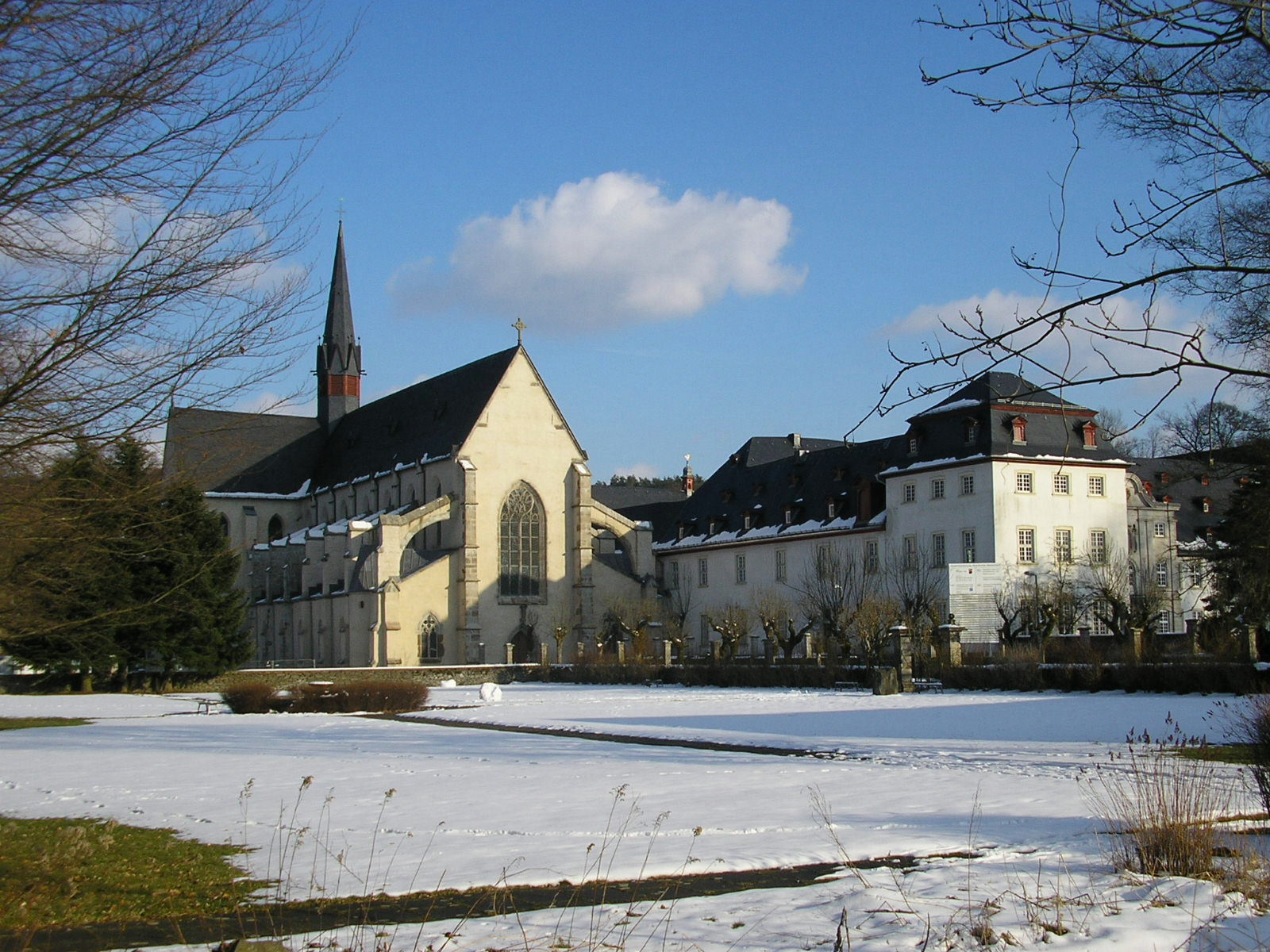
Marienstatt Abbey

A monastery of the Cistercians, Marienstatt Abbey, including a secondary school is located in the state Rhineland-Palatinate, in Streithausen near Hachenburg in the Westerwald.

=== Ireland ===
In the spring of 1140, Saint Malachy, the archbishop of Armagh, visited Clairvaux, becoming a personal friend of Abbot Bernard and an admirer of Cistercian life. He left four of his companions to be trained as Cistercians, and returned to Ireland to introduce Cistercian monasticism there. Mellifont Abbey was founded in County Louth in 1142 and from it daughter houses of Bective Abbey in County Meath (1147), Inislounaght Abbey in County Tipperary (1147–1148), Baltinglass in County Wicklow (1148), Monasteranenagh in County Limerick (1148), Kilbeggan in County Westmeath (1150) and Boyle Abbey in County Roscommon (1161).

Following the Anglo-Norman invasion of Ireland in the 1170s, the English improved the standing of the Cistercian Order in Ireland with nine foundations: Dunbrody Abbey, Inch Abbey, Grey Abbey, Comber Abbey, Duiske Abbey, Abington, Abbeylara and Tracton. This last abbey was founded in 1225 from Whitland Abbey in Wales, and at least in its earliest years, its monks were Welsh-speaking. By this time, another ten abbeys had been founded by Irishmen since the invasion, bringing the total number of Cistercian houses in Ireland to 31. This was almost half the number of those in England, but it was about thrice the number in each of Scotland and Wales. Most of these monasteries enjoyed either noble, episcopal or royal patronage. In 1269, the Archbishop of Cashel joined the order and established a Cistercian house at the foot of the Rock of Cashel in 1272. Similarly, the Irish-establishment of Abbeyknockmoy in County Galway was founded by King of Connacht, Cathal Crobhdearg Ua Conchobair, who died a Cistercian monk and was buried there in 1224.

By 1152, there were 54 Cistercian monasteries in England, few of which had been founded directly from the Continent. Overall, there were 333 Cistercian abbeys in Europe, so many that a halt was put to this expansion. Nearly half of these houses had been founded, directly or indirectly, from Clairvaux, so great was St Bernard's influence and prestige. He later came popularly to be regarded as the founder of the Cistercians, who have often been called Bernardines. Bernard died in 1153, one month after his pupil Eugene III.

=== The Iberian Peninsula ===
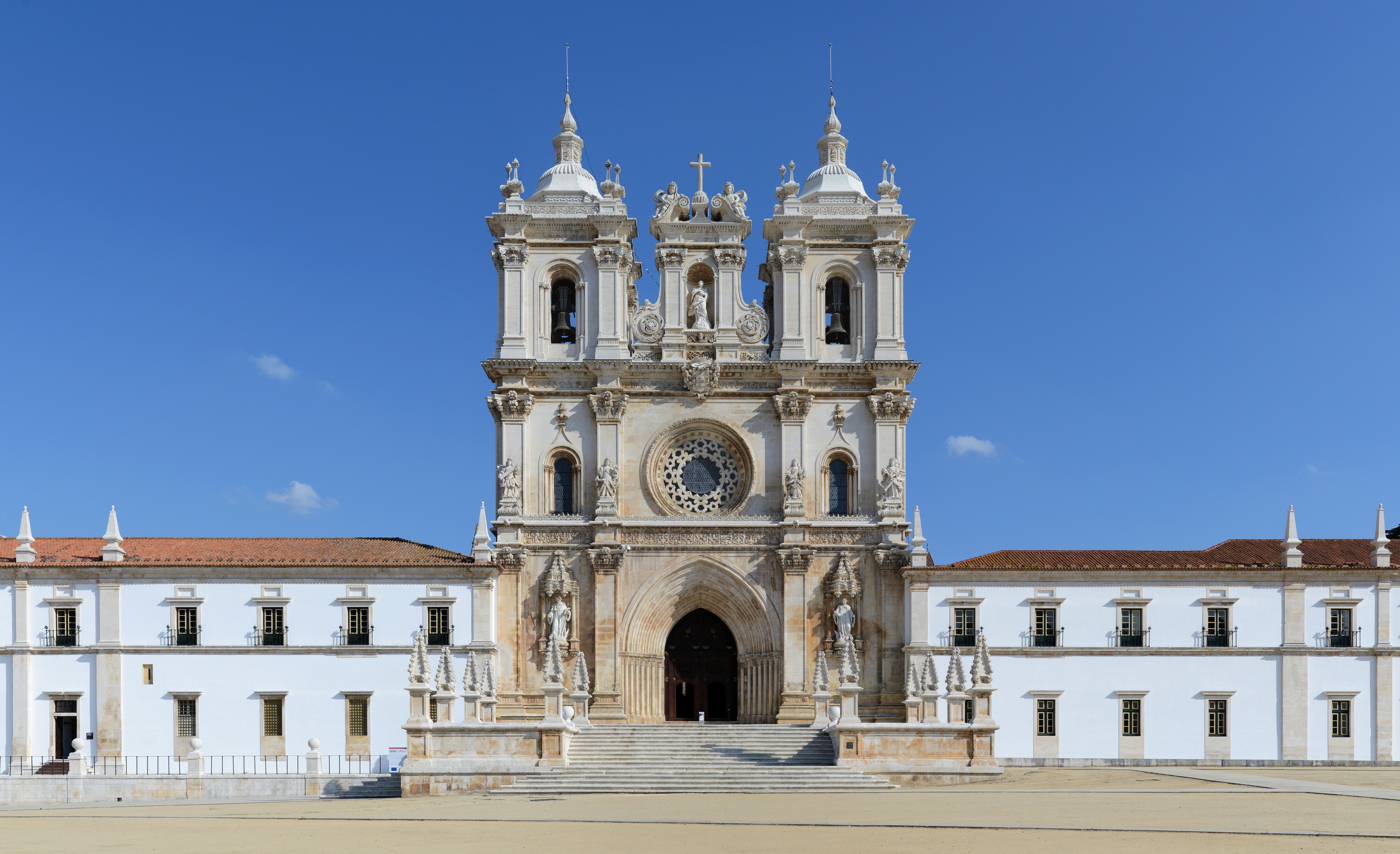
The royal Alcobaça Monastery

In 1153, the first King of Portugal, D. Afonso Henriques (Afonso, I), founded Alcobaça Monastery. The original church was replaced by the present construction from 1178. The abbey's church was consecrated in 1223. Two further building phases followed in order to complete the nave, leading to the final consecration of the medieval church building in 1252.

As a consequence of the wars between the Christians and Moors on the Iberian Peninsula, the Cistercians established a military branch of the order in Castile in 1157: the Order of Calatrava. Membership of the Cistercian Order had included a large number of men from knightly families, and when King Alfonso VII began looking for a military order to defend the Calatrava, which had been recovered from the Moors a decade before, the Cistercian Abbot Raymond of Fitero offered his help. Lay brothers were to be employed as "soldiers of the Cross" to defend Calatrava. The initial successes of the new order in the Spanish Reconquista were convincing, and the arrangement was approved by the General Chapter at Cîteaux and successive popes; the Knights of Calatrava were given a definitive rule in 1187, modeled upon the Cistercian rule for lay brothers, which included the evangelical counsels of poverty, chastity, and obedience; specific rules of silence; abstinence on four days a week; the recitation of a fixed number of Pater Nosters daily; to sleep in their armour; and to wear, as their full dress, the Cistercian white mantle with the scarlet cross fleurdelisée.

Calatrava was not subject to Cîteaux, but to Fitero's mother-house, the Abbey of Morimond in Burgundy. By the end of the 13th century, the knights had become a major autonomous power within the Castilian state, subject only to Morimond and the pope. They had abundant resources of men and wealth, lands and castles scattered along the borders of Castile, and feudal lordship over thousands of peasants and vassals. On more than one occasion, the Order of Calatrava brought to the field a force of 1200 to 2000 knights – considerable in medieval terms. Over time, as the Reconquista neared completion, the canonical bond between Calatrava and Morimond relaxed more and more, and the knights of the order became virtually secularized, finally undergoing dissolution in the 18th–19th centuries.

The first Cistercian abbey in Bohemia was founded in Sedlec near Kutná Hora in 1142. In the late 13th century and early 14th century, the Cistercian order played an essential role in the politics and diplomacy of the late Přemyslid and early Luxembourg state, as reflected in the Chronicon Aulae Regiae. This chronicle was written by Otto and Peter of Zittau, abbots of the Zbraslav abbey (Latin: Aula Regia, "Royal Hall"), founded in 1292 by the King of Bohemia and Poland, Wenceslas II. The order also played the main role in the early Gothic art of Bohemia; one of the outstanding pieces of Cistercian architecture is the Alt-neu Shul, Prague. The first abbey in the present day Romania was founded in 1179, at Igris (Egres), and the second in 1204, the Cârța Monastery.

== The Cistercians in Italy ==
=== Early foundations (1120–1135) ===
The expansion of the Cistercian Order in Italy began in the early decades of the 12th century. The first Cistercian abbey founded on the peninsula was Tiglieto Abbey (Santa Maria alla Croce) in the Ligurian Apennines in 1120, followed in 1124 by Lucedio Abbey in Piedmont.

Some of these early foundations were followed by other significant monasteries in Northern Italy: Morimondo Abbey (1134), Chiaravalle Abbey (1135), Staffarda Abbey, and Cerreto Abbey.

=== Diffusion in the 12th and 13th centuries ===
In the early decades of the 13th century, the Order had approximately five hundred abbeys across Europe. By around 1250, Italy hosted about fifty, thirty of which were recent foundations. By the end of the 13th century, Italian Cistercian abbeys numbered 98, placing the peninsula second only to France, which had 244.

The foundations in Northern Italy (Lombardy, Piedmont, Liguria, Emilia) were followed in the 13th century by an important group of abbeys in Central and Southern Italy, particularly in Lazio, where the great complexes of Fossanova Abbey and Casamari Abbey were established.

==== The abbeys of Lazio ====
Fossanova Abbey, in the municipality of Priverno (province of Latina), is the oldest example of Cistercian Gothic architecture in Italy. It arose at the end of the 12th century from the transformation of a pre-existing Benedictine monastery, granted in 1134 by Pope Innocent II to Burgundian monks. The church was consecrated in 1208. Saint Thomas Aquinas died in this abbey on March 7, 1274.

Casamari Abbey, in the municipality of Veroli (province of Frosinone), was built starting in 1203 and consecrated in 1217. It represents one of the most significant examples of Cistercian Gothic architecture in Italy.

== The Cistercians in Sardinia ==
=== Historical context ===
The Cistercian settlement in Sardinia is part of the broader phenomenon of monastic expansion on the island during the Judicate period (11th–13th centuries). The Sardinian Judges encouraged the arrival of monastic orders to promote the improvement of agricultural techniques and the reclamation of uncultivated lands.

=== The Grand Confirmation of 1153 ===
In 1153, shortly before abdicating, Gonario II confirmed all previous donations made by his predecessors to the Benedictines of Montecassino, defining the boundaries of the properties belonging to the Abbey of Santa Maria di Tergu. The confirmed territory was extraordinary in size, covering approximately eight thousand hectares. Within its borders, along the western limit, stood the monasteries of San Pietro de Trecinglo (or Trighinzos) and San Pietro d'Othari, the latter located «verso su monumentu dessu gigante» (toward the monument of the giant), near the Tomba dei giganti di Oridda - Badde Nigolosu in Romangia. In 1154, Gonario II abdicated in favor of his son Barisone II and retired to Clairvaux Abbey in France, where he spent the rest of his life as a monk. He died after 1182.

=== The Cistercians and viticulture ===
The Cistercian settlement in Romangia is of particular interest to the history of viticulture. In Burgundy, Cistercian monks developed innovative viticultural techniques, creating the first recorded project of vineyard zonation in history.

By the 12th century, Romangia was already an area with a strong viticultural vocation. The Condaghe di San Pietro di Silki records the donation by Mariane de Thori of the domus of Gennor (in the modern territory of Sennori) «cum servos et ankillas, e cum terras, e cum binias» (with male and female servants, with lands, and with vineyards). According to historian Raimondo Turtas, the substantial landed property provided to the Cistercians suggests that the Sardinian Judges expected a significant contribution to agricultural improvement, likely including viticulture.

== Notes ==
By the end of the 13th century, the Cistercian houses numbered 500. In this period, the monks performed pastoral tasks in and outside of the monastery and began preaching and teaching, even though their movement originally forbade schools and parishes. At the order's height in the 15th century, it would have nearly 750 houses.

It often happened that the number of lay brothers became excessive and out of proportion to the resources of the monasteries, there being sometimes as many as 200, or even 300, in a single abbey. On the other hand, in some countries, the system of lay brothers in course of time worked itself out; thus in England by the close of the 14th century it had shrunk to relatively small proportions, and in the 15th century the regimen of the English Cistercian houses tended to approximate more and more to that of the Black Monks.

== Influence with popes and kings ==
Cistercian influence more than kept pace with the material expansion. Bernard had become mentor to popes and kings, and in 1145, King Louis VII's brother, Henry of France, entered Clairvaux. That same year, Bernard saw one of his monks elected pope as Pope Eugene III. Eugene was an Italian of humble background, who had first been drawn to monasticism at Clairvaux by the magnetism of Bernard. At the time of his election, he was Abbot of Saints Vincenzo and Anastasio outside Rome.

A considerable reinforcement to the Order was the merger of the Savigniac houses with the Cistercians, at the insistence of Eugene III. Thirteen English abbeys, of which the most famous were Furness Abbey and Jervaulx Abbey, thus adopted the Cistercian formula. In Dublin, the two Savigniac houses of Erenagh and St Mary's became Cistercian. It was in the latter case that medieval Dublin acquired a Cistercian monastery in the very unusual suburban location of Oxmantown, with its own private harbour called The Pill.

== Decline and attempted reforms ==
For a hundred years, until the first quarter of the 13th century, the Cistercians supplanted Cluny as the most powerful order and the chief religious influence in western Europe. But then in turn their influence began to wane, as the initiative passed to the mendicant orders, in Ireland, Wales and elsewhere.

Relaxations were gradually introduced into Cistercian life with regard to diet and simplicity of life. Also, they began accepting the traditional sources of income that monks in comparable orders used: like rents, tolls, and benefices. The agricultural operations were blessed by success. Wealth and splendour characterized the monasteries, so that by 1300, the standard of living in most abbeys was comparable, if not higher, than the standards middling nobles enjoyed. Two important papal bulls tried to introduce reforms: Clement IV's Parvus fons and Benedict XII's Fulgens sicut stella matutina. The General Chapter continued to battle against abuses.

In Ireland, the information on the Cistercian Order after the Anglo-Norman invasion gives a rather gloomy impression. Absenteeism among Irish abbots at the General Chapter became a persistent and much criticised problem in the 13th century, and escalated into the conspiratio Mellifontis, a "rebellion" by the abbeys of the Mellifont filiation. Visitors were appointed to reform Mellifont on account of the multa enormia that had arisen there, but in 1217 the abbot refused their admission and had lay brothers bar the abbey gates. There was also trouble at Jerpoint, and alarmingly, the abbots of Baltinglass, Killenny, Kilbeggan and Bective supported the actions of the "revolt".

In 1228, the General Chapter sent the Abbot of Stanley in Wiltshire, Stephen of Lexington, on a well-documented visitation to reform the Irish houses. A graduate of both Oxford and Paris, and a future Abbot of Clairvaux (to be appointed in 1243), Stephen was one of the outstanding figures in 13th-century Cistercian history, having founded the College of St. Bernard in Paris in 1244. He found his life threatened as a result of the Irish visitations: his representatives were attacked and his party harassed, while the three key houses of Mellifont, Suir and Maigue had been fortified by monks to hold out against him. However, with the help of his assistants, the core of obedient Irish monks and the aid of both English and Irish secular powers, he was able to envisage the reconstruction of the Cistercian province in Ireland. Stephen dissolved the Mellifont filiation altogether, and subjected 15 monasteries to houses outside Ireland. In breadth and depth, his instructions constituted a radical reform programme: "They were intended to put an end to abuses, restore the full observance of the Cistercian way of life, safeguard monastic properties, initiate a regime of benign paternalism to train a new generation of religious, isolate trouble-makers and institute an effective visitation system." The arrangement lasted almost half a century, and in 1274, the filiation of Mellifont was reconstituted.

In Germany the Cistercians were instrumental in the spread of Christianity east of the Elbe. They developed grants of territories of 180,000 acres where they would drain land, build monasteries and plan villages. Many towns near Berlin owe their origins to this order, including Heiligengrabe and Chorin; its Chorin Abbey was the first brick-built monastery in the area. By this time, however, "the Cistercian order as a whole had experienced a gradual decline and its central organisation was noticeably weakened."

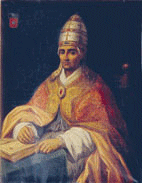
Pope Benedict XII

In 1335, the French cardinal Jacques Fournier, a Cistercian monk, was elected and consecrated Pope Benedict XII. He was devoted to reducing the culture of nepotism at the Vatican. He promulgated a series of regulations to restore the spirit of reform in the Cistercian Order.

By the 15th century, however, the Cistercians had fallen on dark days. The General Chapter lost virtually all its power to enforce its decrees, and the strength of the order which derived from this uniformity declined. Wars, among them the Hundred Years' War, and a lack of leadership did damage. Many of the monasteries were controlled by dynasties who appointed their relatives to leadership positions, and pocketed the abbeys' profits. The system of placing abbeys in commendam was widespread and led to the spiritual and material decline of many abbeys.

== Protestant Reformation ==
=== Evangelical Lutheranism ===
Germany became the scene of violence and destabilization following Martin Luther's efforts to separate from the Vatican. Though some abbeys lost monks who left religious life to marry, other Cistercian monasteries, such as Loccum Abbey and Amelungsborn Abbey, adopted the Evangelical Lutheran faith and continued religious life under solemn vows, being active in the present-day. For example, the Evangelical-Lutheran Cistercian Monastery of Amelungsborn has nine religious and a number of tertiaries.

=== Anglicanism ===
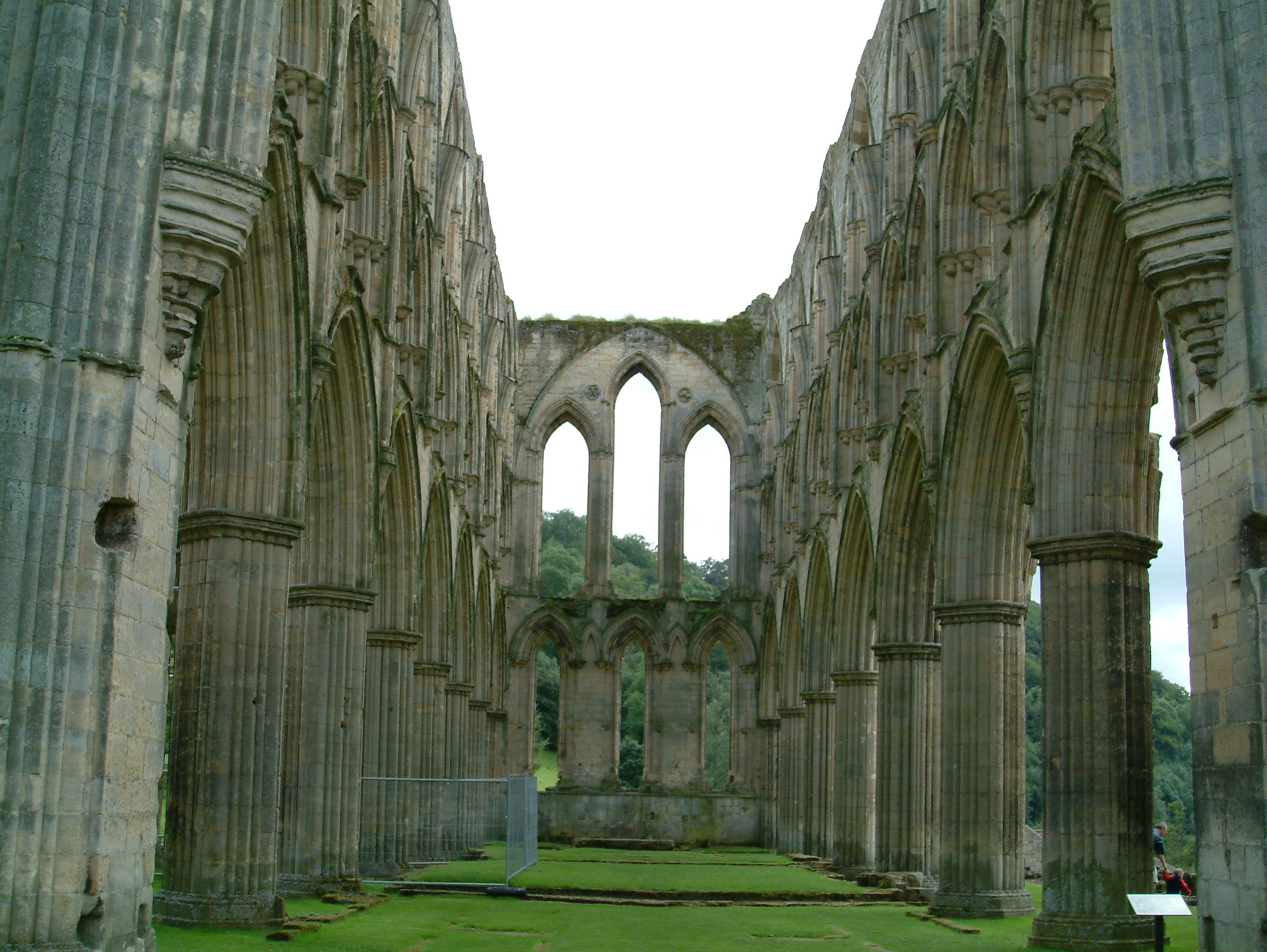
Rievaulx Abbey, confiscated by Henry VIII along with its blast furnace at Laskill

During the English Reformation, Henry VIII's Dissolution of the Monasteries saw the confiscation of every single monastery in that country, a disaster not only for the Cistercians. Some historians believe that the suppression of the English monasteries may have stamped out an industrial revolution.

A revival of religious orders took place under the Oxford Movement in the Anglican tradition. As such, there are Anglican Cistercian communities that remain active in the present day.

=== After the Reformation ===
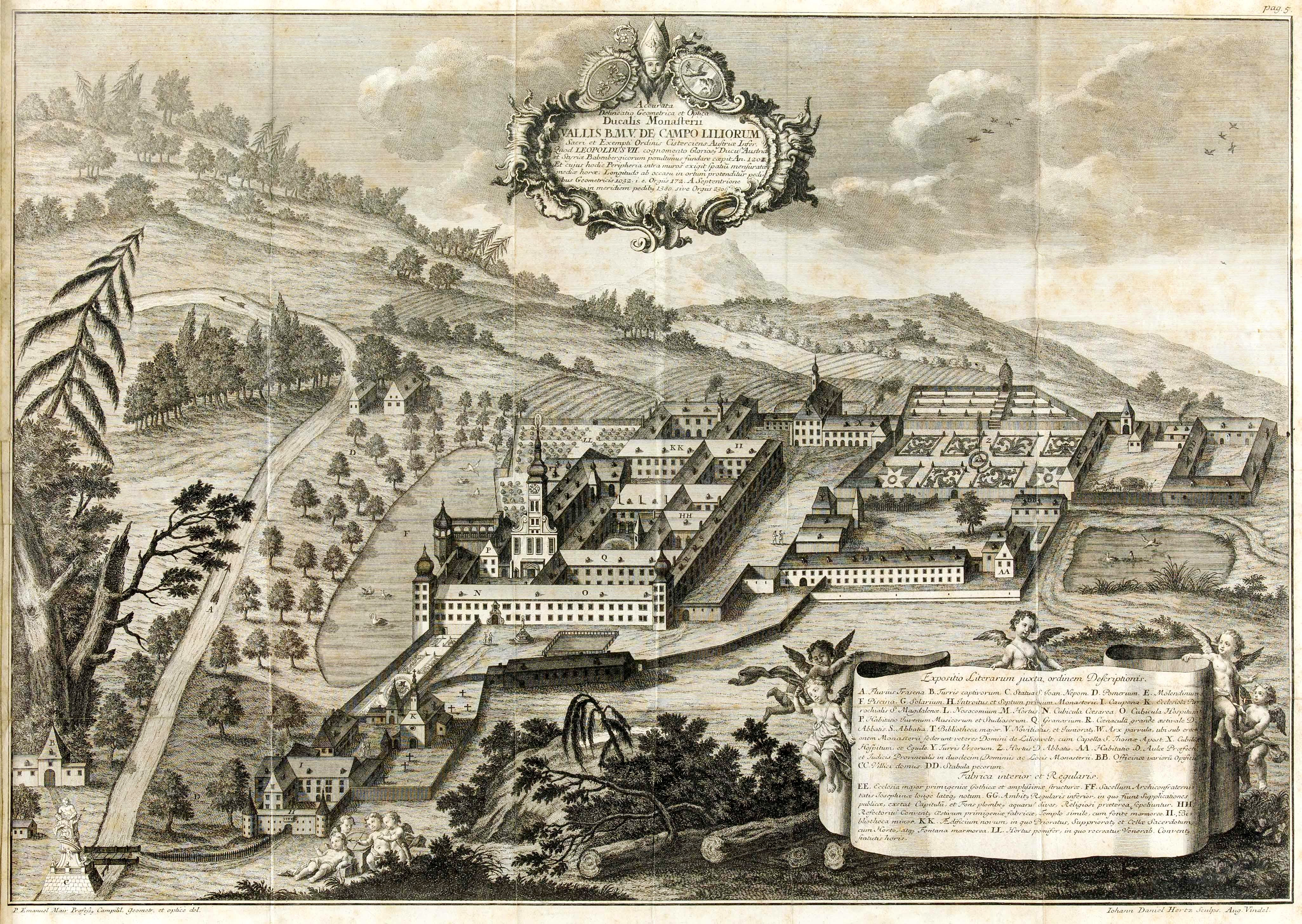
View of the Lilienfeld Cistercian Abbey, 1747

The reformed Congregation of the Feuillants spread widely in France and Italy in the 16th century. The French congregation of Sept-Fontaines (1654) also deserves mention. In 1663 Jean de Rancé reformed La Trappe (see Trappists).

In the 17th century another great effort at a general reform was made, promoted by the pope and the king of France; the general chapter elected Richelieu to be (commendatory) abbot of Cîteaux, thinking he would protect them from the threatened reform. In this they were disappointed, for he threw himself wholly on the side of reform. A formidable battle ensued, making it clear that Italian and Central European abbeys did not want to go the way of the Trappists. Civic politics also played a role in the conflict.

The Protestant Reformation, the ecclesiastical policy of Emperor Joseph II, the French Revolution, and the revolutions of the 18th century almost wholly destroyed the Cistercians. But some survived, and from the beginning of the last half of the 19th century there was a considerable recovery.

In 1892, the Trappists left the Cistercians and founded a new order, named the Order of Cistercians of the Strict Observance. The Cistercians that remained within the original order thus came to be known as the "Common Observance".

== Influence ==
=== Architecture ===
Cistercian architecture is an important medieval European architectural tradition. Cistercian foundations were primarily constructed in Romanesque and Gothic architecture during the Middle Ages; although later abbeys were also constructed in Renaissance and Baroque.

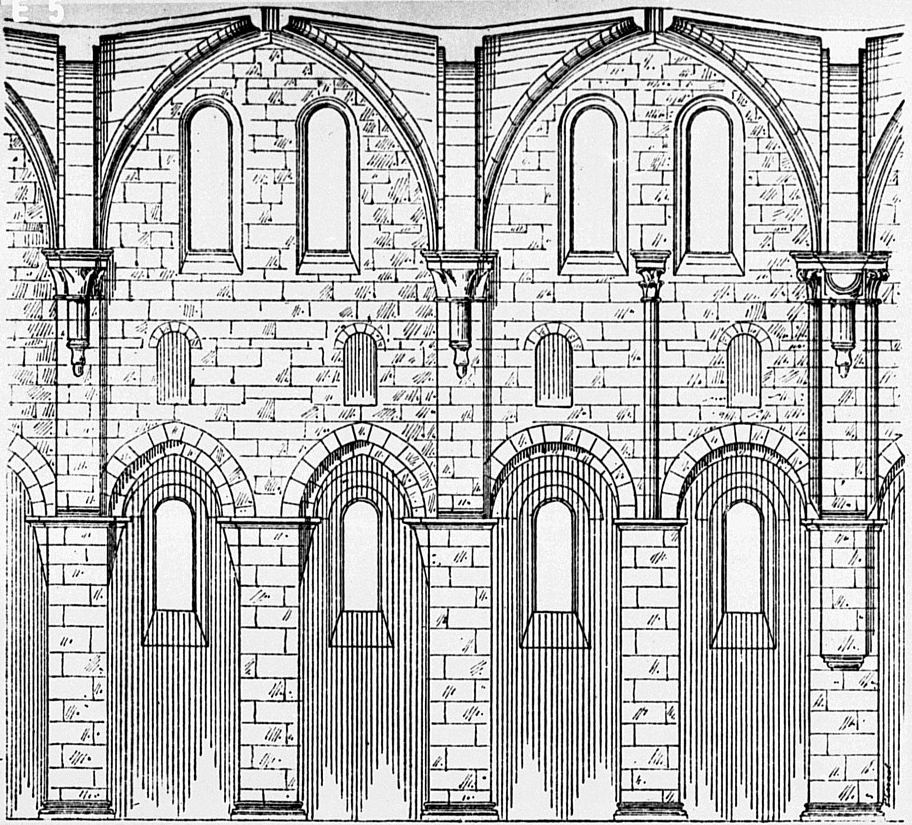
Cistercian architecture was applied based on rational principles.

The Cistercian order had no fixed building rules but rather Cistercian prohibitions regarding building practices, including the prohibition of decoration as signs of poverty and simplicity, as seen in early Cistercian architecture. Furthermore, the order itself was receptive to the technical improvements of Gothic principles of construction and played an important role in its spread across Europe.

Bernard condemned excessive decoration of monastic buildings as a distraction for monks.

Cistercian architecture embodied the ideals of the order, and was in theory at least utilitarian and without ornamentation. The same "rational, integrated scheme" was used across Europe to meet the largely homogeneous needs of the order. Various buildings, including the chapter-house to the east and the dormitories above, were grouped around a cloister, and were sometimes linked to the transept of the church itself by a night stair. Usually Cistercian churches are cruciform, with a short presbytery to meet the liturgical needs of the brethren, small chapels in the transepts for private prayer, and an aisled nave that was divided roughly in the middle by a screen to separate the monks from the lay brothers.

=== Engineering and construction ===
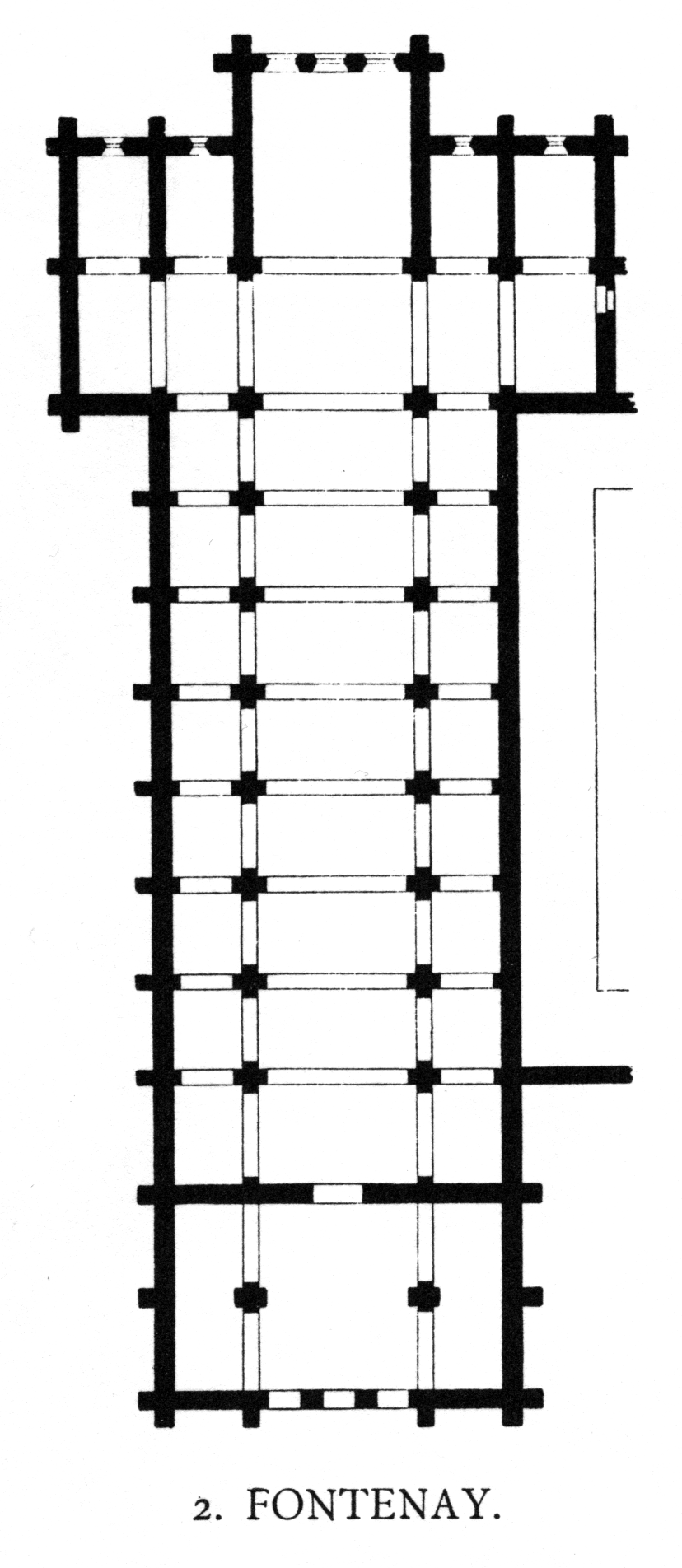
Plan of the church of Abbaye de Fontenay

The building projects of the Church in the High Middle Ages showed that the era encourage colossal architecture, with vast amounts of stone being quarried; the same was true of the Cistercian projects. Foigny Abbey was 98 metres (322 ft) long, and Vaucelles Abbey was 132 metres (433 ft) long. Monastic buildings came to be constructed entirely of stone, right down to the most humble of buildings. In the 12th and 13th centuries, even Cistercian barns consisted had stone exteriors.

The Cistercians acquired a reputation as masters in administering ecclesial construction projects. Bernard's own brother, Achard, is known to have supervised the construction of many abbeys, such as Himmerod Abbey in the Rhineland. On one occasion the abbot of La Trinité at Vendôme loaned a monk named John to the Bishop of Le Mans, Hildebert de Lavardin, for the building of a cathedral; after the project was completed, John refused to return to his monastery. However, the monks did not construct their edifices alone. As early as 1133, Bernard was hiring workers to help the monks erect new buildings at Clairvaux. An illustration from the 16th century shows monks working alongside other craftsmen at Schönau Abbey.

=== World Heritage Sites ===
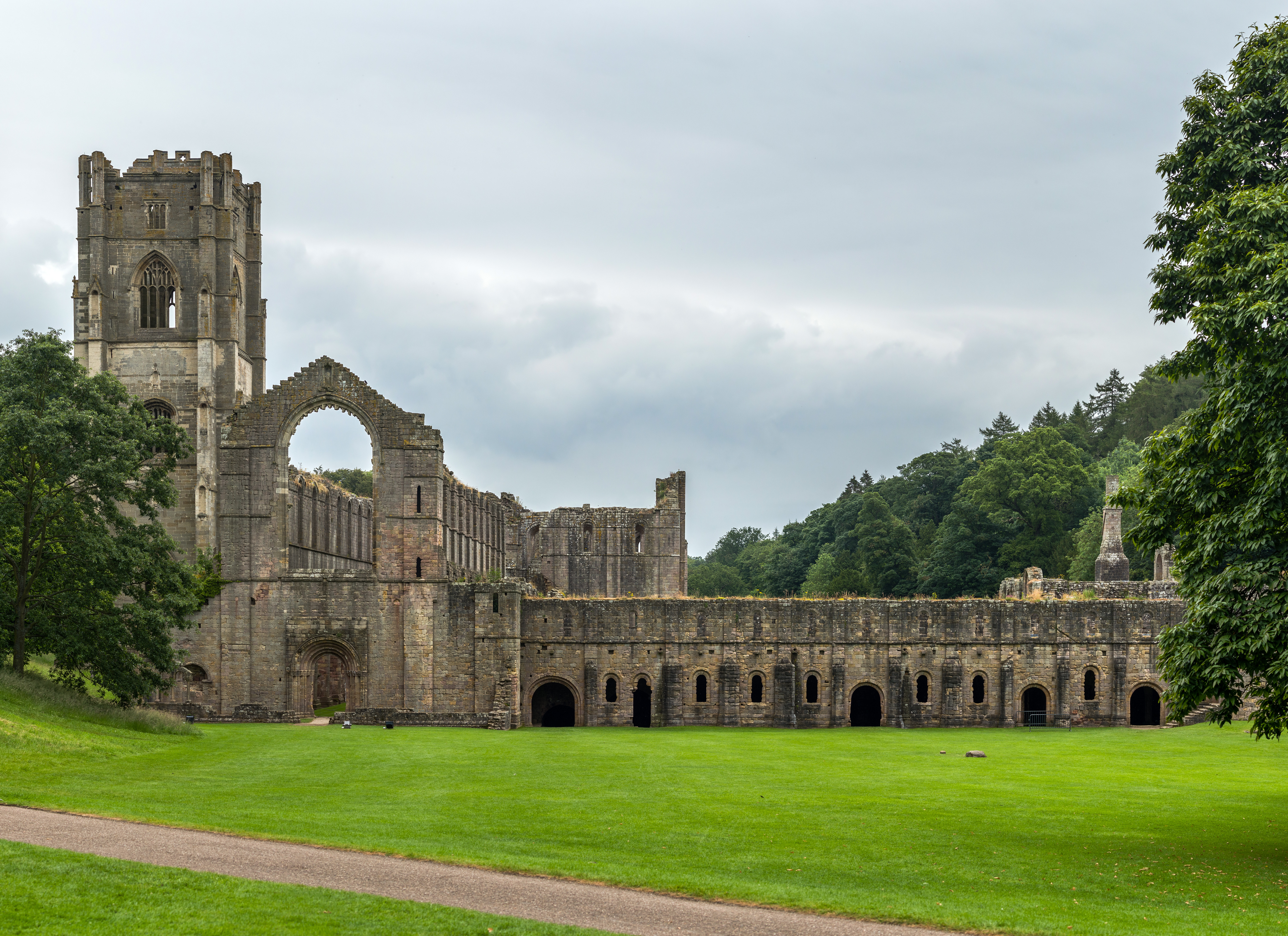
Fountains Abbey

The Cistercian abbeys of Fontenay in France, Fountains in England, Alcobaça in Portugal, Poblet in Spain and Maulbronn in Germany are today recognised as UNESCO World Heritage Sites.

In the purity of architectural style, the beauty of materials and the care with which the Alcobaça Monastery was built, Portugal possesses one of the most outstanding and best preserved examples of Early Gothic. Poblet Monastery, one of the largest in Spain, is considered similarly impressive for its austerity, majesty, and the fortified royal residence within. The fortified Maulbronn Abbey in Germany is considered "the most complete and best-preserved medieval monastic complex north of the Alps". The Transitional Gothic style of its church had a major influence in the spread of Gothic architecture over much of northern and central Europe, and the abbey's elaborate network of drains, irrigation canals and reservoirs has since been recognised as having "exceptional" cultural interest.

== Art ==
The mother house of the order, Cîteaux, had developed an advanced style of painting in illuminated manuscripts during the first decades of the 12th century. However, as Bernard of Clairvaux's influence increased, decoration gradually diminished in Cistercian manuscripts. He had a strong aversion to the extensive use of imagery. Decorations were finally banned altogether in the order. Any wall paintings that may have existed were presumably destroyed. Crucifixes were allowed, and later some painting and decoration crept back in. Bernard criticized abbey churches for their "immoderate length, their superfluous breadth, the costly polishings, the curious carvings and paintings which attract the worshipper's gaze and hinder his attention." He loathed the fantastical, often deformed beasts used in medievial church decoration. Weaker monks would be tempted "to spend the whole day in wondering at these things rather than in meditating the law of God."

The 14th-century tomb of Peter I of Portugal in Alcobaça

Nonetheless, many Cistercian abbey churches housed the tombs of royal or noble patrons, and these were often elaborately carved and painted. Notable dynastic burial places were Alcobaça for the Kings of Portugal, Cîteaux for the Dukes of Burgundy, and Poblet for the Kings of Aragon. Corcomroe in Ireland contains one of only two surviving examples of Gaelic royal effigies from 13th and 14th century Ireland.

== Agriculture, technology, and commerce ==
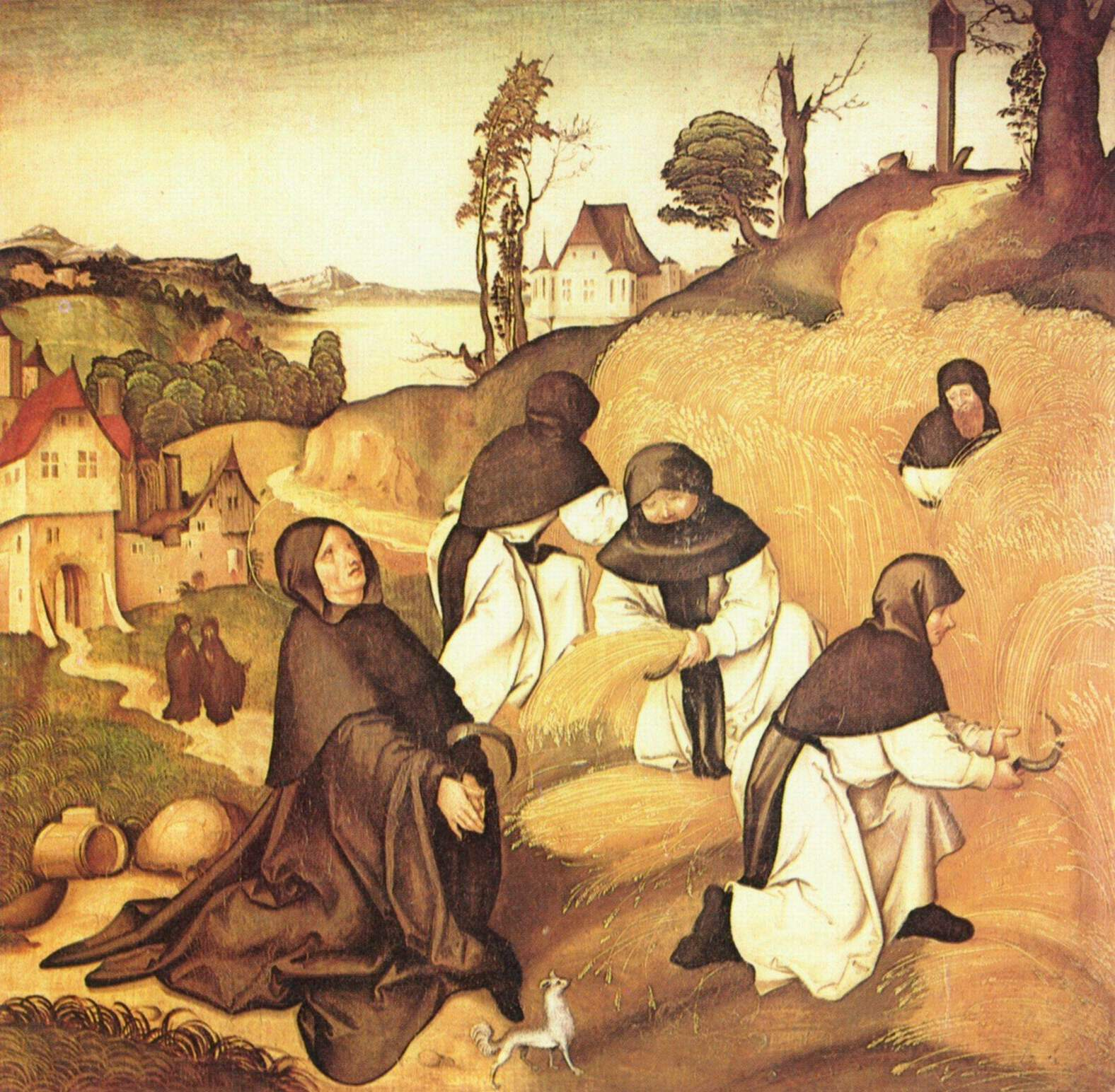
Cistercians at work, by Jörg Breu the Elder (1500)

Successful farmers, the white monks introduced and propagated many improvements in medieval agriculture. They developed an organised system for selling produce, cattle and horses, and notably contributed to commercial progress in Western Europe. To the wool and cloth trade, which was especially fostered by the Cistercians, England was largely indebted for the beginnings of her commercial prosperity.

From the beginning, the monks used a system of lay brothers and employees to operate their farms; monks and priests were busy with their liturgical and sacramental duties. The lay brothers formed a body of men who lived alongside of the choir monks, but separate from them, not taking part in the canonical office, but having their own fixed round of prayer and religious exercises. They were not ordained, nor did they have a voice in the monks' chapter.

Numbers written with Cistercian numerals.

One Cistercian monk claims that, until the Industrial Revolution, most of the technological advances in Europe were made in the monasteries. According to the medievalist Jean Gimpel, their high level of industrial technology facilitated the diffusion of new techniques: "Every monastery had a model factory, often as large as the church and only several feet away, and waterpower drove the machinery of the various industries located on its floor." Waterpower was used for crushing wheat, sieving flour, fulling cloth and tanning – a technological achievement in use in practically all of the order's monasteries. The monks used their own numbering system, which could express all the numbers from 0 to 9999 in a single sign.

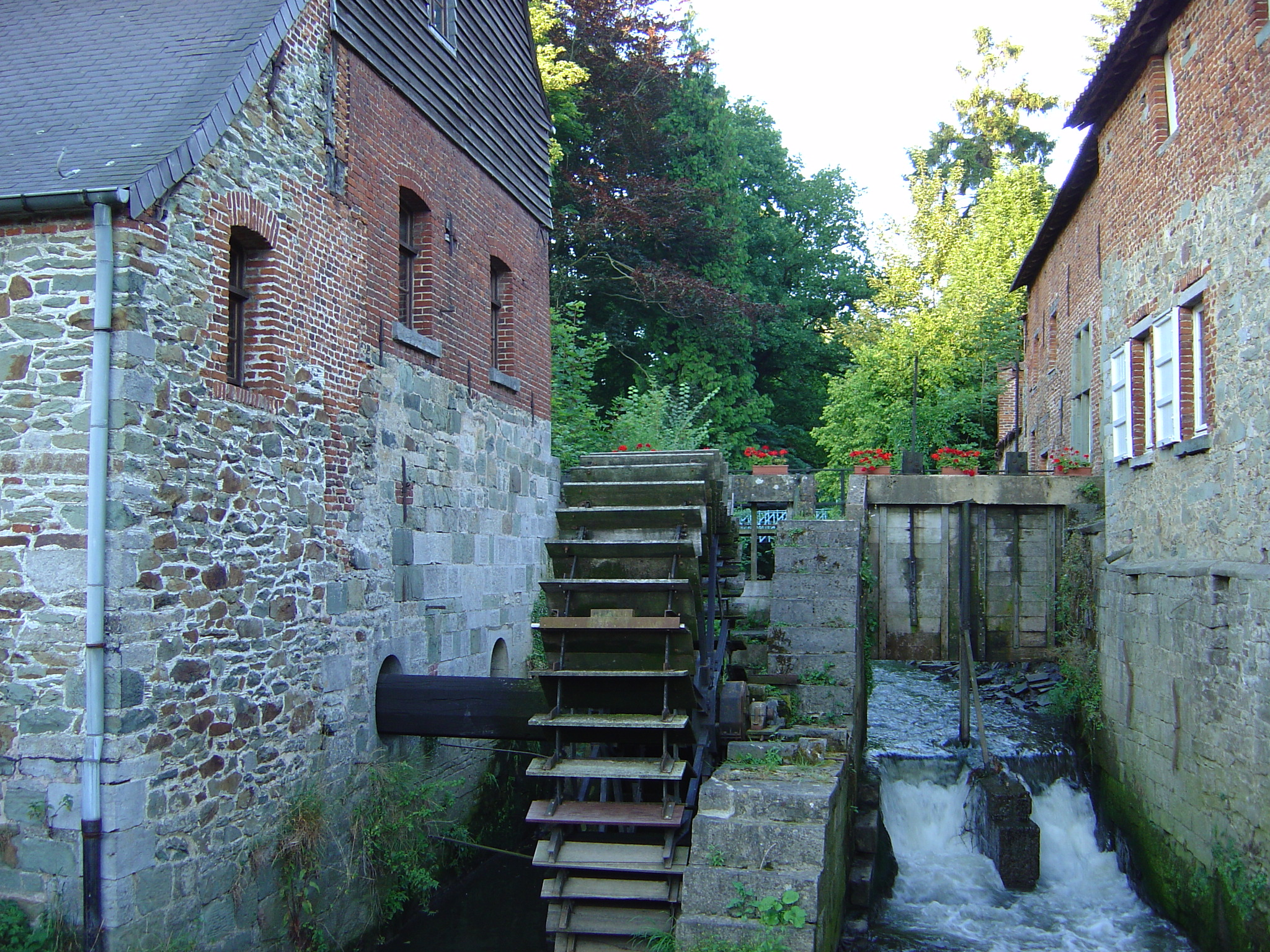
Waterwheel technology

The Cistercian order was innovative in developing techniques of hydraulic engineering for monasteries established in remote valleys. In Spain, one of the earliest surviving Cistercian houses, the Real Monasterio de Nuestra Senora de Rueda in Aragon, is a good example of such early hydraulic engineering, using a large waterwheel for power and an elaborate water circulation system for central heating.

The Cistercians are known to have been skilled metallurgists, and knowledge of their technological advances was transmitted by the order. Iron ore deposits were often donated to the monks along with forges to extract the iron, and within time surpluses were being offered for sale. The Cistercians became the leading iron producers in Champagne, from the mid-13th century to the 17th century, also using the phosphate-rich slag from their furnaces as an agricultural fertiliser. The forge at Fontenay abbey, for instance, is not on the margins of the abbey grounds, but within the monastic enclosure itself. Cistercian innovations may have shaped the very course of Gothic architecture.

== Theology ==
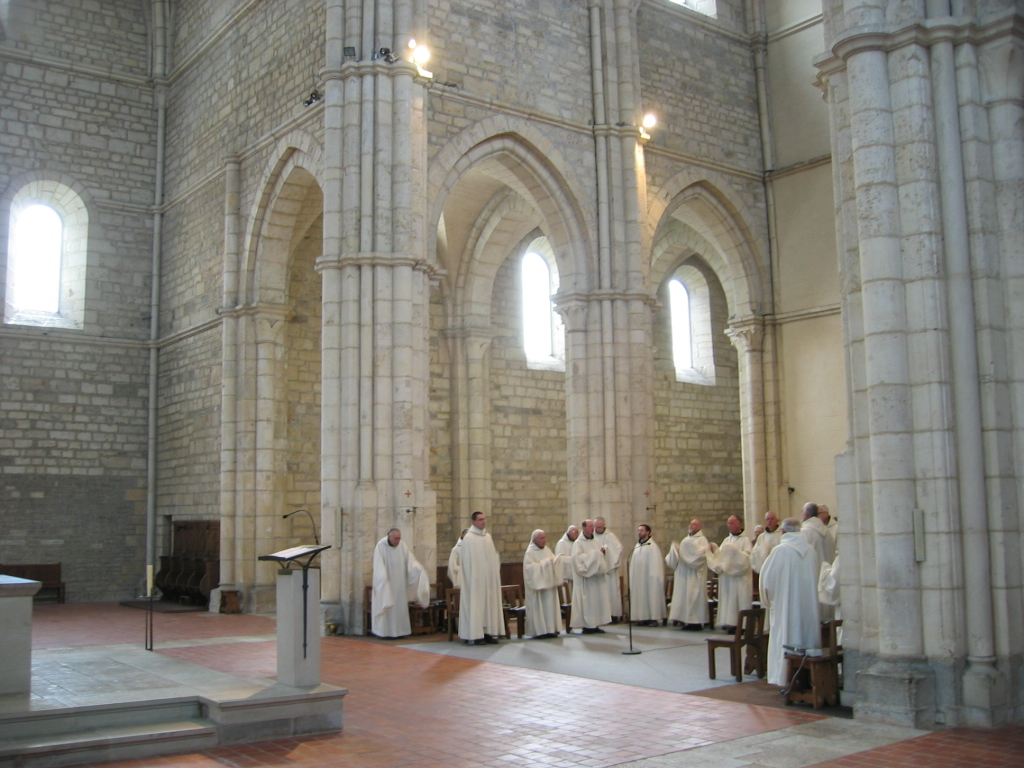
Monks at Abbey of Acey in France

By far the most influential of the early Cistercians was Bernard of Clairvaux. He attracted vocations, served as a papal envoy, and attracted international attention to the movement: he was "one of the most influential churchmen of his time." Bernard was an ascetic and intellectual, which he demonstrated in his sermons on Grace, Free will and the Song of Songs. He was quick to recognise heretical ideas, and in 1141 and 1145 respectively, he accused the celebrated scholastic theologian Peter Abelard and the popular preacher Henry of Lausanne of heresy. He was also charged with the task of promulgating Pope Eugene's bull, Quantum praedecessores, and his eloquence in preaching the Second Crusade recruited many to the cause.

Although Bernard's De laude novae militiae was in favour of the Knights Templar, the English Cistercian Abbot Isaac of Stella, near Poitiers, preached against the very same group as a "new monstrosity". In the course of the 12th and 13th centuries, many Cistercian authors wrote on spiritual topics. The "four evangelists" of the movement are: Bernard, William of Saint Thierry, Aelred of Rievaulx, and Guerric of Igny. During the Middle Ages, they were often read by monks from other orders, for example the Carthusians. Besides Bernard, the others were only re-discovered in the 20th century.

== Cistercians today ==
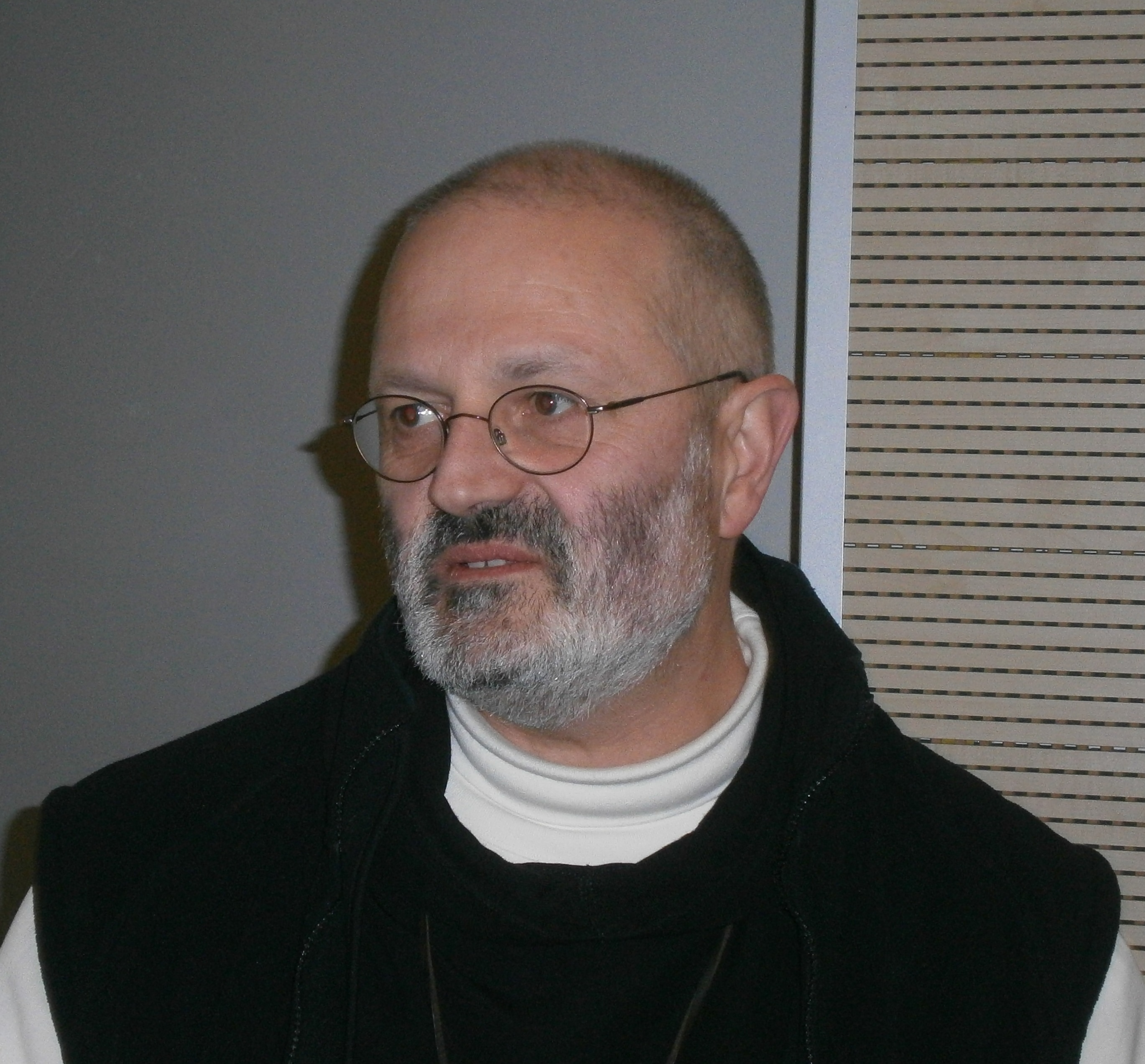
Mauro-Giuseppe Lepori, Abbot General since 2010

Many Cistercian monasteries make produce goods such as cheese, bread, and craft products. In the United States, some abbeys support themselves through agriculture, forestry and real estate. European Trappist monasteries are known for their beer.

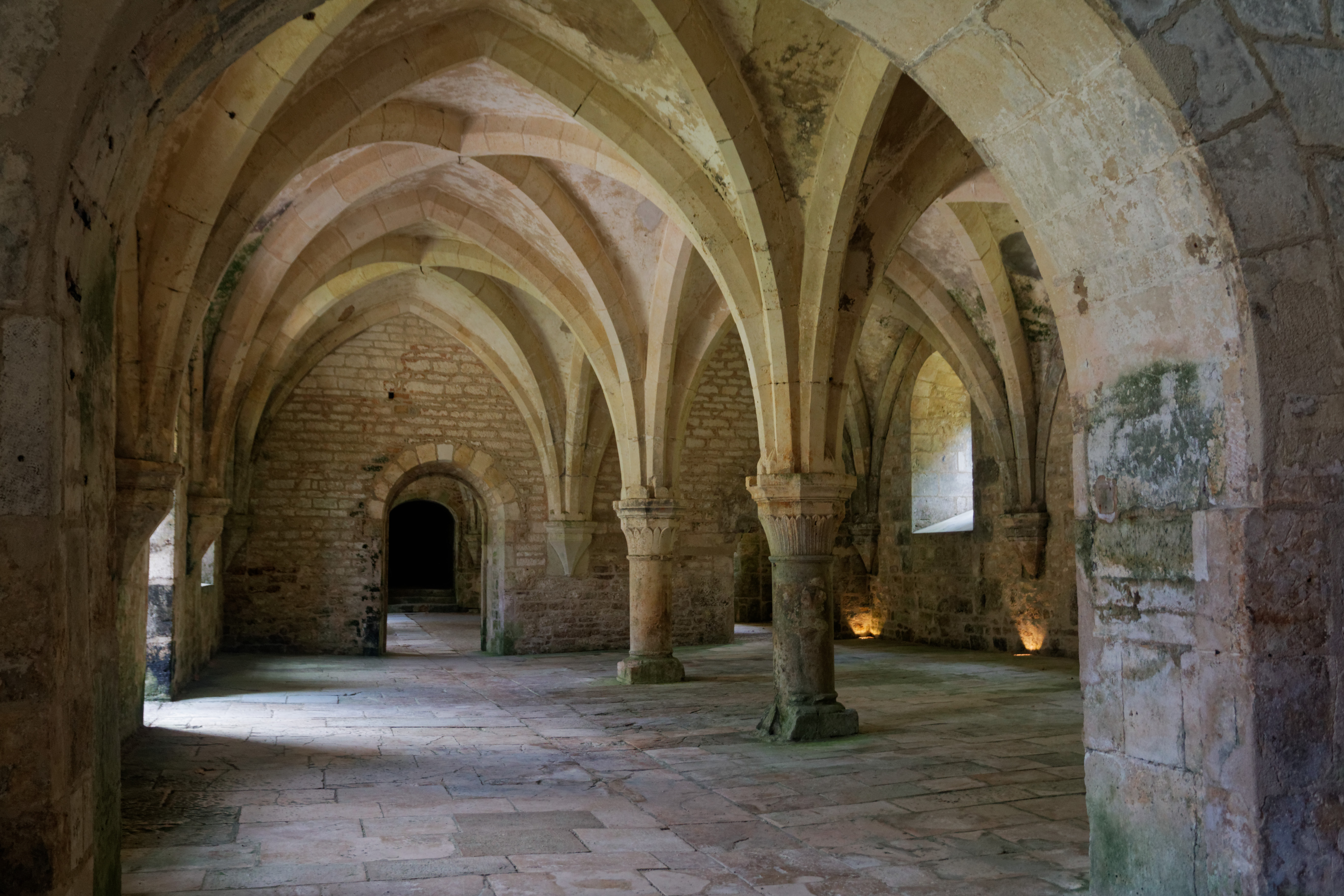
Fontenay Abbey, Chapter house, France

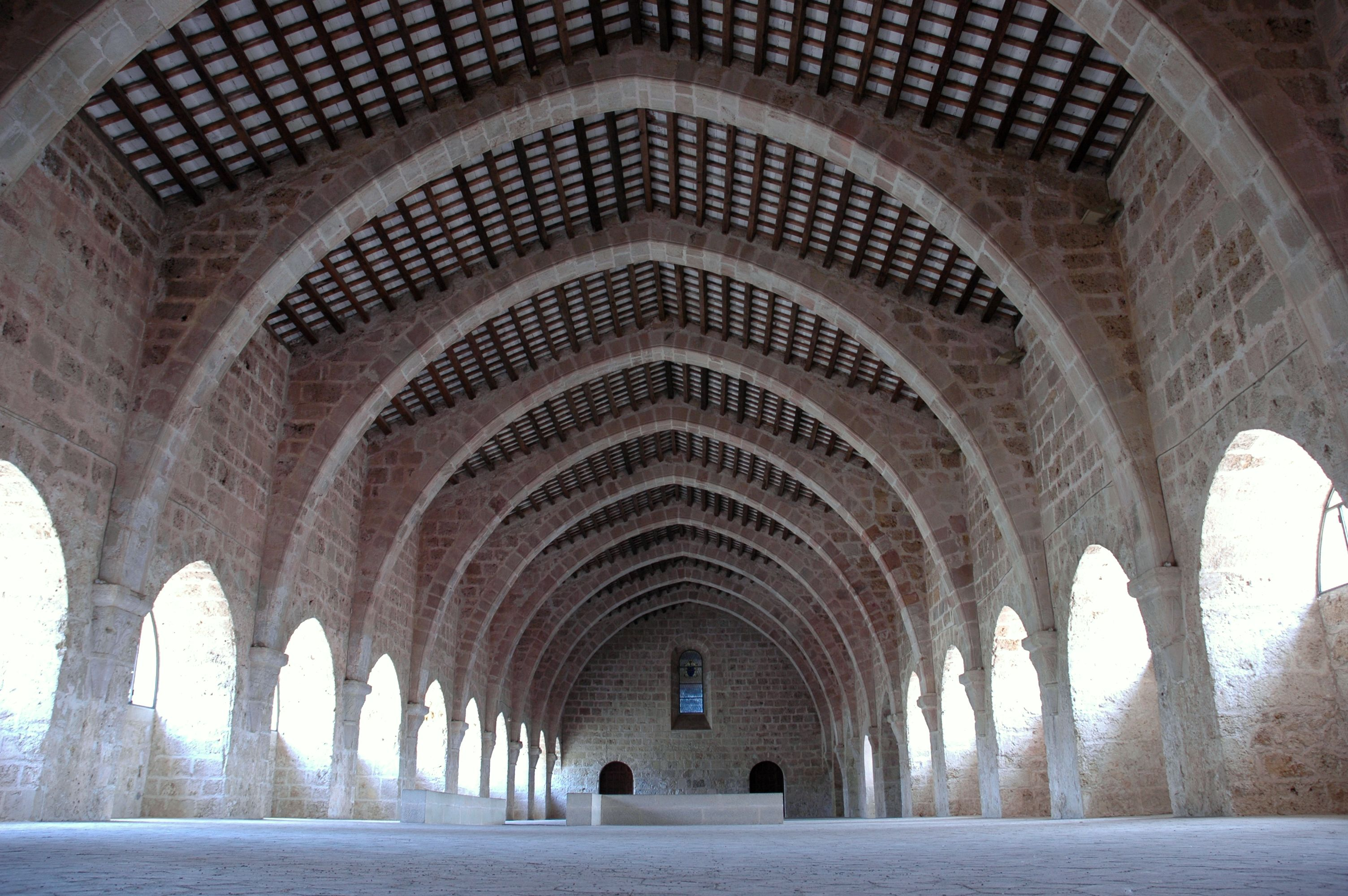
Santes Creus, Dormitory, Spain

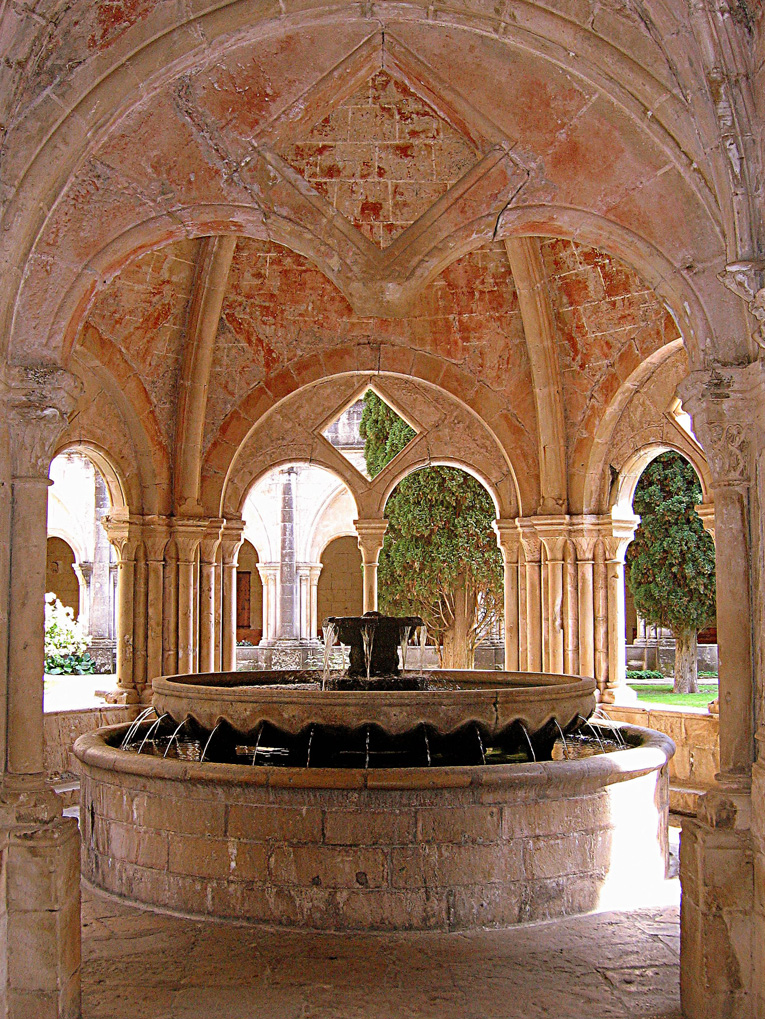
Poblet Abbey, Fountain, Spain

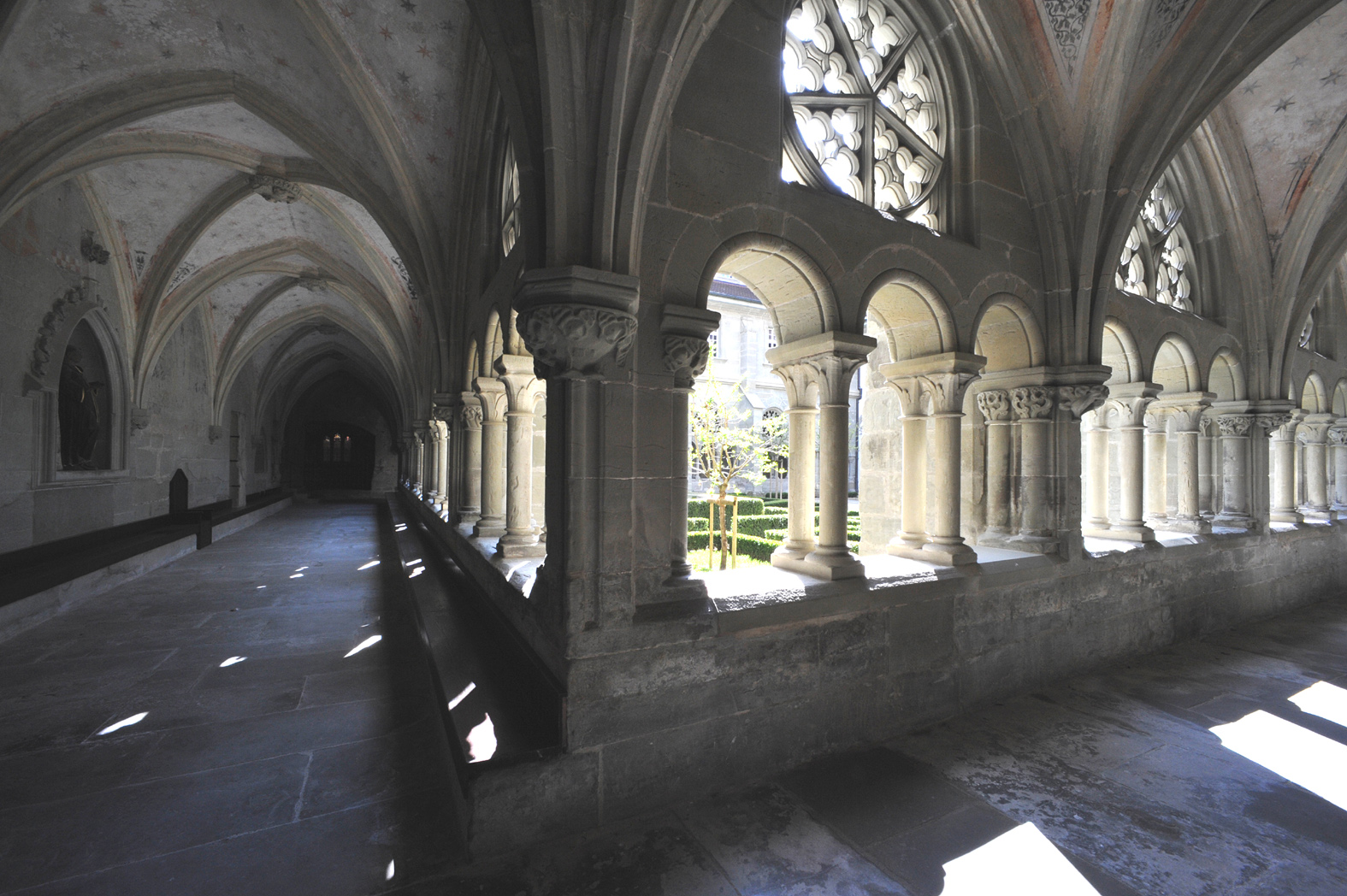
Hauterive Abbey, Cloister, Switzerland

== See also ==
- List of Cistercian monasteries
- Monastic sign languages
- Cistercian numerals

== Literature ==
- Clarke, Howard B.; Dent, Sarah; Johnson, Ruth (2002). Dublinia: The Story of Medieval Dublin. Dublin: O'Brien. ISBN 978-0-86278-785-1.
- Dodwell, C.R.; The Pictorial arts of the West, 800–1200, (1993), Yale UP, ISBN 0-300-06493-4
- Doran, Linda; Lyttleton, James, eds. (2008). Lordship in Medieval Ireland: Image and reality (Hardback, illustrated ed.). Four Courts Press. ISBN 978-1-84682-041-0.
- Dykes, D.W. (1980). Alan Sorrell: Early Wales Re-created. National Museum of Wales. ISBN 978-0-7200-0228-7.
- Gimpel, Jean, The Medieval Machine: The Industrial Revolution of the Middle Ages New York, Penguin, (1976)
- Hollister, C. Warren (1992) [1966]. The Making of England, 55 BC to 1399. Volume I of A History of England, edited by Lacey Baldwin Smith (6th ed.). Lexington, MA: D.C. Heath. ISBN 978-0-669-24457-1.
- Lekai, Louis (1977). The Cistercians: Ideals and Reality. The Kent State University Press, 1977. ISBN 978-0-873-38201-4.
- Logan, F. Donald, A History of the Church in the Middle Ages.
- Richter, Michael (2005). Medieval Ireland: the enduring tradition (Revised, illustrated ed.). Gill & Macmillan. ISBN 978-0-7171-3293-5.
- Rudolph, Conrad, "The 'Principal Founders' and the Early Artistic Legislation of Cîteaux", Studies in Cistercian Art and Architecture 3, Cistercian Studies Series 89 (1987) 1–45
- Rudolph, Conrad, Violence and Daily Life: Reading, Art, and Polemics in the Cîteaux Moralia in Job (1997)
- Tobin, Stephen. The Cistercians: Monks and Monasteries in Europe. The Herbert Press, LTD (1995). ISBN 1-871569-80-X.
- Toman, Rolf, ed. (2007). The Art of Gothic: Architecture, Sculpture, Painting. photography by Achim Bednorz. Tandem Verlag GmbH. ISBN 978-3-8331-4676-3.
- Watt, John, The Church in Medieval Ireland. University College Dublin Press; 2nd Rev. ed. (1998). ISBN 978-1-900621-10-6.
