= Diogo de Contreiras =

Diogo de Contreiras was a Portuguese Mannerist painter, active between 1521 and 1562. He has been identified as the painter referred to as the Master of Saint Quentin. The identification of de Contreiras as the Master of Saint Quentin was determined by Martin Soria (1957) and later reinforced by Vítor Serrão.

== Career ==
His first recorded works were decorations for the triumphal entry of King Manuel I and his wife Eleanor of Austria into Lisbon in 1521. His work was part of 429 flags painted by Portuguese painters of the time (including Álvaro Pires, Diogo Gonçalo, Martins Fernandes and Fernão de Oliveira), paid for by the Lisbon Chamber of Commerce.

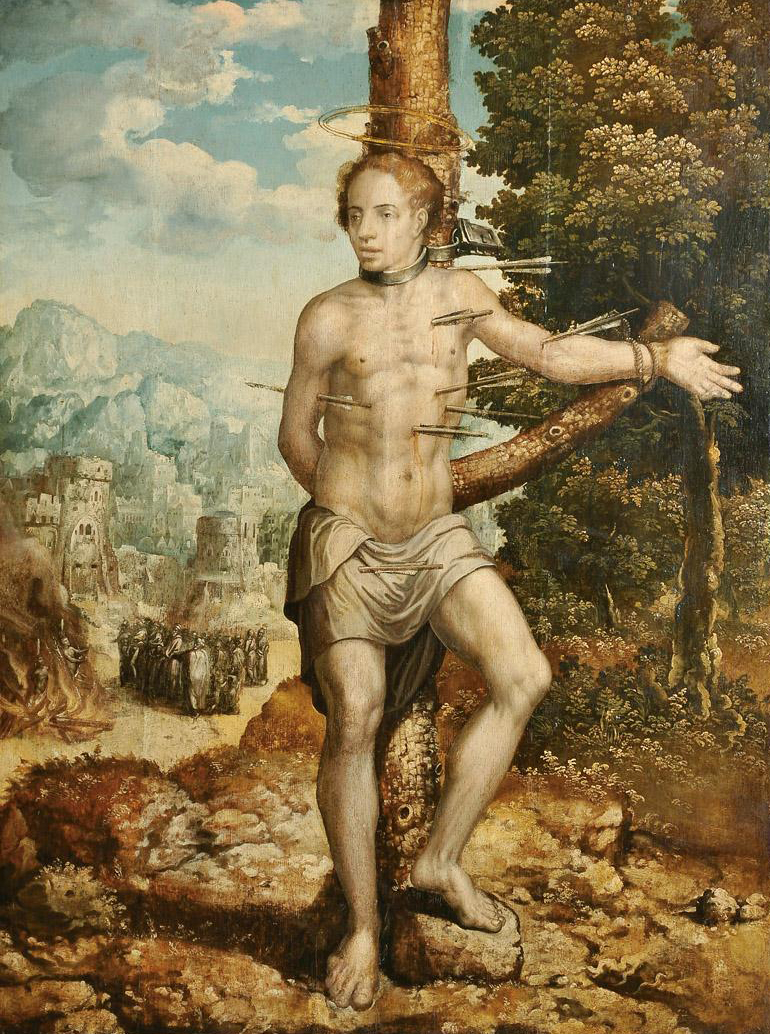
St Sebastian

He worked on the Church of São Silvestre in Unhos, contributing two tableaus dedicated to St. Sylvester, showing scenes of his life, to the church altarpiece (made 1537-1538) and four panels with images of other saints (made 1560-1570). The church has been declared a monument of public interest by the Portuguese government. The scenes of St. Sylvester's life shown are St. Sylvester resurrecting a bull in Zambri and converting the Emperor Constantine. The other panels, possibly originally made for a second altar or a sacristy, show St. Roque, St. Peter, St. Sebastian and St. Bras.

In 1539 de Contreiras painted the altarpiece of the church of Our Lady of Mercy in Ourém. The altarpiece, whose manufacture took till 1541 and cost 80 thousand reais, is now lost.

Around the same time he also worked on the retable of the Convent of Santa Maria in Almoster. Three panels of this retable exist in private collections. They are a Resurrection, a panel of St. Vincent and a panel of St. Sylvester.

de Contreiras taught at the College of Art in the University of Coimbra from 1545 to 1549 and again from 1551 to 1555.

In 1546 he worked on the convent of São Bento de Castris in Évora, which is also a Portuguese national monument. Several of his other works from the 1540s are now lost, and those that exist are religious works.

In 1551, he painted The Baptism of Christ in the church of St. Francisco in Alenquer. In that year, he also held the role of the Examiner of Painters in Lisbon, alongside António de Espinhosa and António de Aguiar.

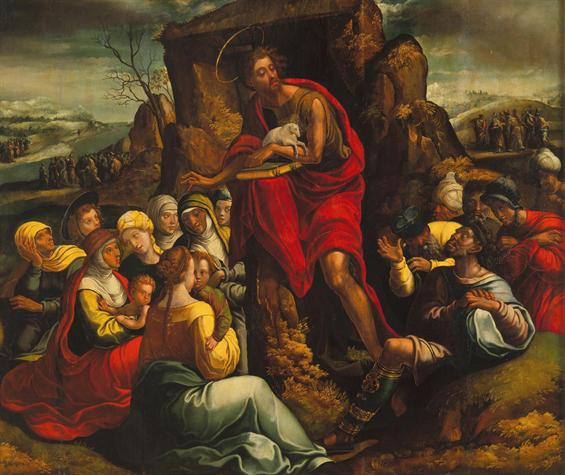
"The Preaching of St. John the Baptist" by Diogo de Contreiras, originally made for the convent of the Cistercian nuns of Évora, now held in the Portuguese Museum of Ancient Art.

Between 1552 and 1554, he did further work on the convent of São Bento de Castris. This work includes "the Preaching of Saint John the Baptist" which is now held in the Portuguese Museum of Ancient Art. Contreiras received 30 thousand reais, distributed over three years, in wheat and money, for the work.

In 1553-1554 de Contreiras painted an altarpiece for the now lost Convent of Santa Clara in Santarem.

de Contreiras may also have painted the Last Supper, the Pentecost and the Holy Trinity in the Chapel of the Holy Spirit in the church of Matriz de Machico on Madeira. However, the identification of de Contreiras as the painter of these works is disputed. Also on the islands of Madeira, de Contreiras may have been the painter who produced the altarpiece in the Madre de Dios church in Caniço, which features St. James the Greater, John the Baptist, St. Catherine of Alexandria and St. Anthony, and the work in the belfry of the church of Matriz de São Brás, which features an Annunciation, St. Anthony, St. Benedict and St. Anthony, and, finally, The Miracle of St. Brás. He also painted some panels in the Church of St. James the Lesser in Funchal.

In 1556, he painted the Triptych of the Conception, Birth and Childhood of the Virgin, also for the convent of São Bento de Castris. This work is now found in the Museum of Sacred Art in Evora. This work is among the last to have been identified as being by de Contreiras. Other works, held in the Rilvas and Alpoim Galvão collections, and other private collections, show how important de Contreiras was to Portuguese painting in the 16th century.

The last reference to de Contreiras is that he was again examiner of Lisbon painters, this time with João Guterres and Gaspar Dias.
