= Robert of Molesme =

11th-century French saint

Saint Robert of Molesme
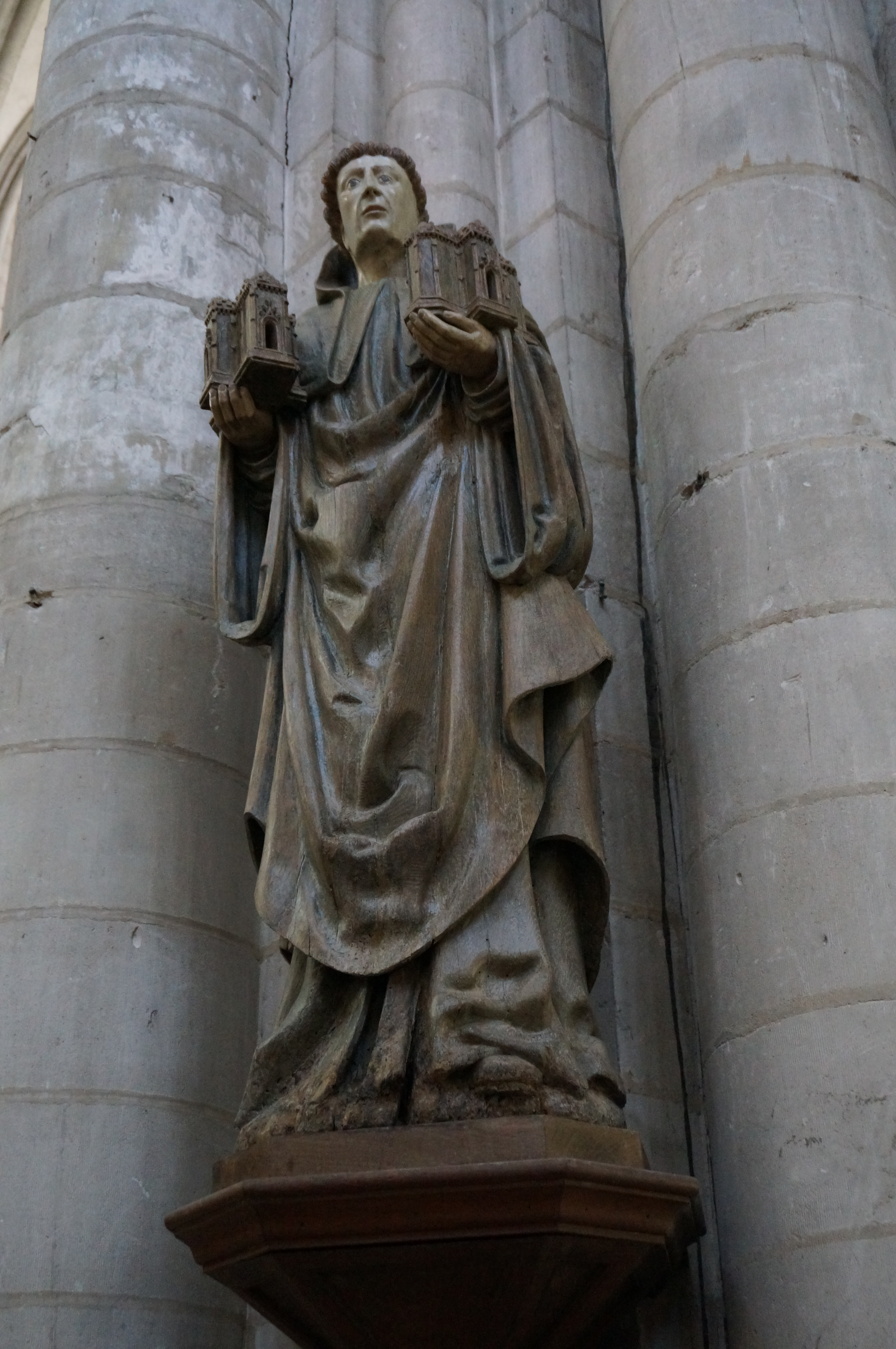
- Robert of Molesme, 15th century statue
- Born: 1028; Troyes, County of Champagne, Kingdom of France
- Died: 17 April 1111 (aged 82–83); Molesme, Kingdom of France
- Venerated in: Catholic Church
- Canonized: 1222 by Pope Honorius III
- Feast: 26 January

Robert of Molesme (1028 – 17 April 1111) was an abbot, and a founder of the Cistercian Order. He is venerated as a Christian saint.

== Life ==
Robert was born about 1029 near Troyes, a younger son of Thierry and Ermengarde, nobles of Champagne. He entered the Benedictine abbey of Montier-la-Celle near Troyes at age fifteen and rose to the office of prior.

He was made abbot of Saint Michel-de-Tonnerre around the year 1070, but he soon discovered that the monks were quarrelsome and disobedient, so he returned to Montier-la-Celle.

Meanwhile, two hermits from a group of monks who had settled at Collan went to Rome and asked Pope Gregory VII to appoint Robert as their superior. The pope granted their request, and by 1074, Robert served as their leader. Soon after, Robert moved the small community to Molesme in the valley of Langres in Burgundy. Initially, the establishment consisted of only huts made of branches surrounding a chapel in the forest, dedicated to the Holy Trinity. Molesme Abbey quickly became known for its piety and sanctity, and Robert's reputation as a saintly man grew. It is because of this renown that in 1082, Bruno of Cologne came to Robert seeking advice. He lived with Robert's community for a time before going on to found the Grande Chartreuse, the first Carthusian monastery.

In 1098, there were 35 dependent priories of Molesme, other annexes, and some houses of nuns. Donors from the surrounding area vied with one another in helping the monks, so that they soon had more than they needed and slackened their way of life, becoming tepid. Benefactors sent their children to the abbey for education, and other non-monastic activities began to dominate daily life. The vast landholdings they had acquired required a large number of employees. As the community grew increasingly wealthy, it began to attract men seeking entry for the wrong reasons. They caused a division among the brothers, challenging Robert's severity. Robert twice tried to leave Molesme but was ordered back by the pope.

== Cîteaux ==
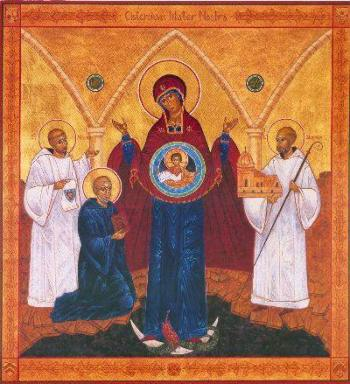
Modern icon of the founders of Cîteaux Abbey: Saints Robert (kneeling), Albéric and Stephen Harding venerate the Blessed Virgin Mary as the Theotokos of the Sign.

In 1098, Robert and twenty-one of his monks left Molesme with the intention of never returning. Renaud, the Viscount of Beaune, gave this group a desolate valley in a deep forest where they founded Cîteaux Abbey. Stephen Harding and Albéric – two of Robert's monks from Molesme – were pivotal in founding the new house. Hugh of Die, Archbishop of Lyons, was persuaded that they could not subsist there without endorsement from an influential churchman, so he wrote in their favour to Odo I, Duke of Burgundy. Odo paid for the construction they had begun, helping the monks finance their operating expenses and providing them with substantial land and cattle. The Bishop of Challons elevated the new monastery to the canonical status of an abbey.

In 1099, the monks of Molesme asked Robert to return and agreed to submit entirely to his interpretation of the Rule of Saint Benedict; the local bishop also pressured Robert to return. He agreed, and Molesme became a major center of Benedictine life under his tutelage. Albéric was made his successor as abbot at Cîteaux, with Stephen Harding as prior.

Robert died on 17 April 1111, and Pope Honorius III canonized him in 1222. His feast day in the Roman Catholic Church is also on 17 April, with the Benedictines celebrating him, along with Alberic of Cîteaux and Stephen Harding on February 26.

The Vie de saint Robert de Molesme was written by Guy, his immediate successor as abbot of Molesme.
