= Molesme Abbey =

Abbey in France

Coordinates: 47°56′3″N 4°21′25″E

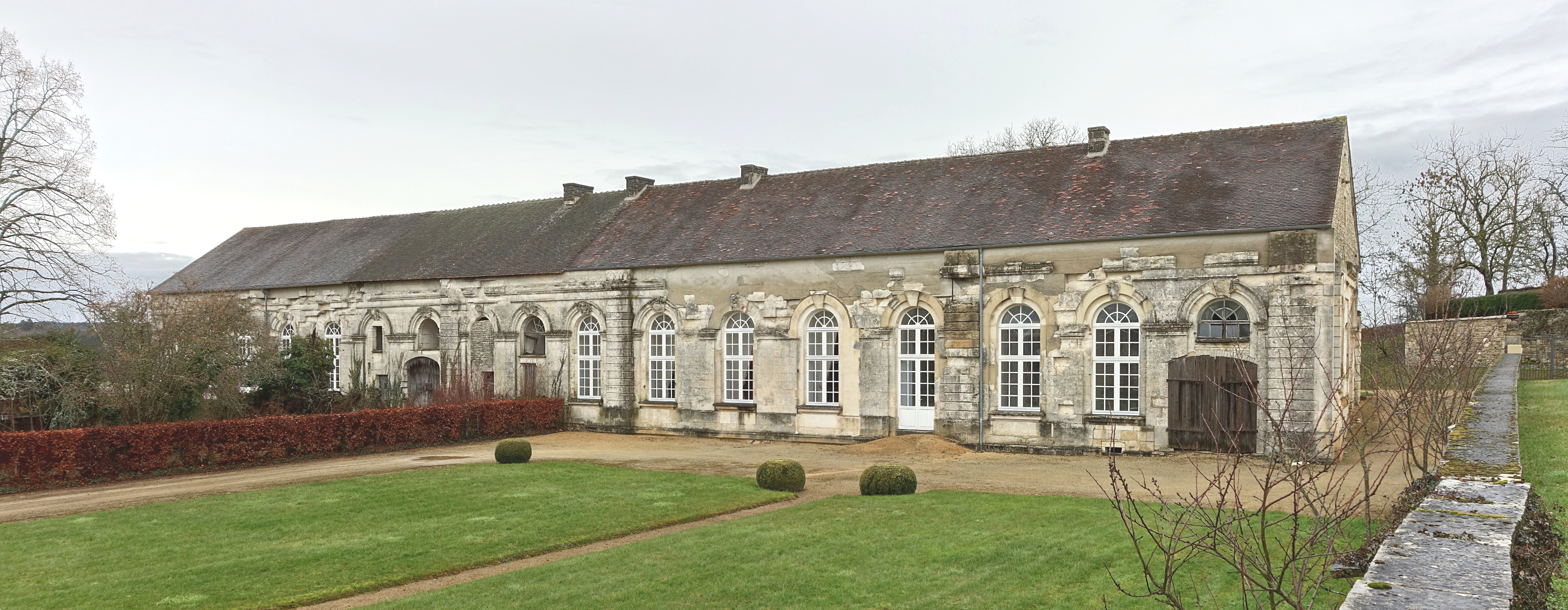
Molesme Abbey

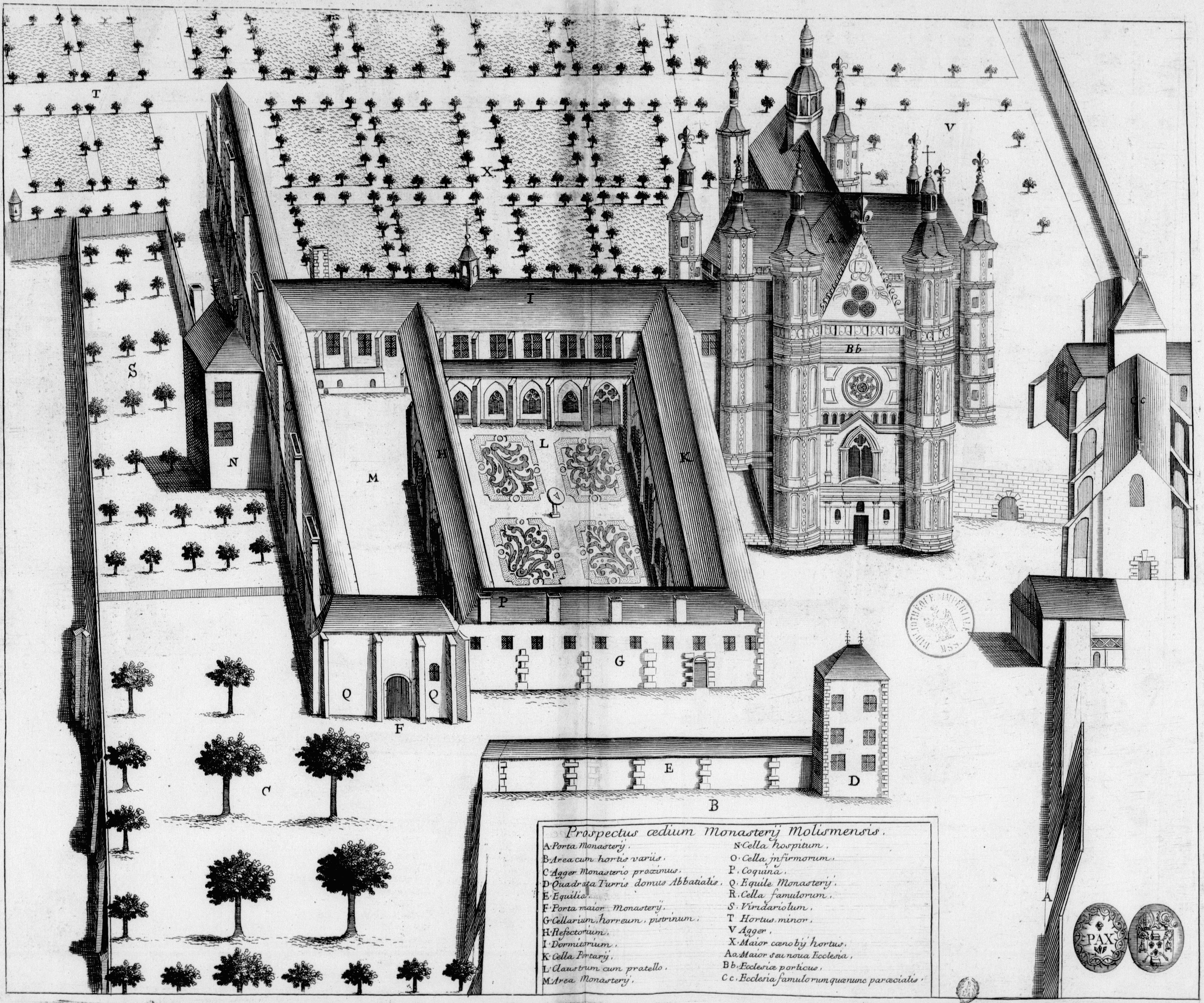
Molesme Abbey during the 17th century

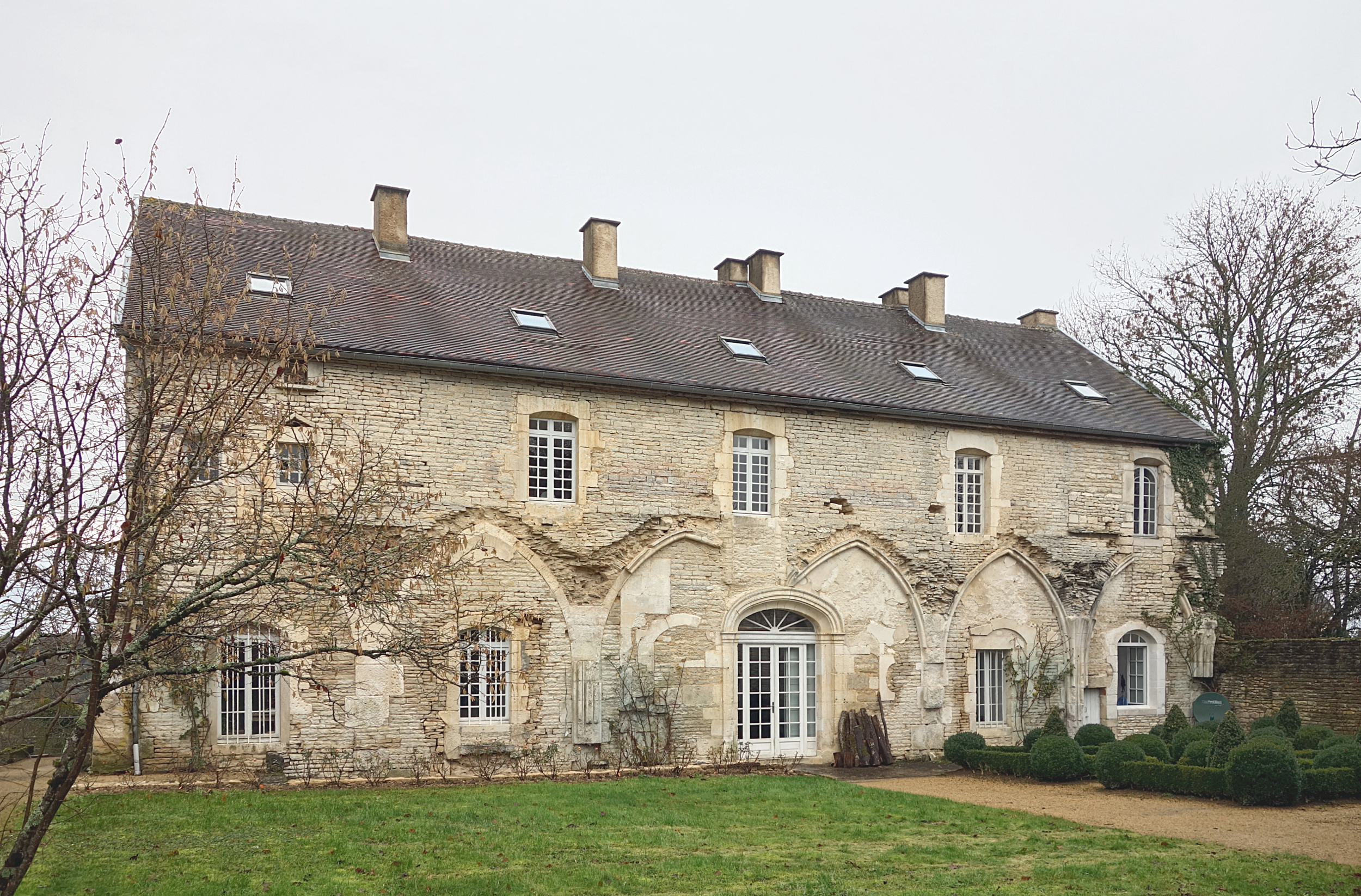
The house or "logis"

Molesme Abbey was a well-known Benedictine (Note: Cluniac, a particular pattern of Benedictine observance) monastery in Molesme, (Note: not to be confused with Molesmes, Yonne) in Laignes, Côte-d'Or, Duchy of Burgundy, on the border of the Dioceses of Langres and Troyes.

== History ==
Molesme Abbey was founded in 1075 by Robert, a former prior of the Abbey of Montier-la-Celle near Troyes. In 1070 he was appointed abbot of the Abbey of Saint-Michel in Tonnerre, which had become lax in observance of the Benedictine Rule. He found the monks reluctant to adopt any reforms and returned to Montier-la-Celle.

At about this time, he consented to repeated requests from a group of hermits to lead them in founding a new community of austerity of life. They settled in 1075 on a piece of land on a hillside by the River Laigne, in the present Molesme, not far from what once was the site of the Gallo-Roman settlement of Vertillum. The land had been given to Abbot Robert by Hugo de Norlennac. There they built a house and chapel from the branches of trees. The community lived in extreme poverty until a bishop visited them, and, seeing their need, sent them a supply of food and clothing.

News of the Abbey's dogma and piousness soon spread and attracted many members of noble families, who often brought all their worldly possessions with them. These gifts, together with the many benefactions the new abbey received, allowed the community to build a large church and suitable monastic buildings.

Among the many who were inspired to join Robert at Molesme were Stephen Harding, future leader of the Cistercians, and Bruno of Cologne, future founder of the Carthusian Order.

The increase in numbers and wealth however caused a temporary loss of rigour, in that many of the new monks were not keen to work in the fields, preferring to live on the alms given to them. This dissatisfaction reached the point of open rebellion and Robert, therefore, left Molesme in 1098, accompanied by only the most fervent religious, and this time founded Cîteaux Abbey, which although it was initially intended as a Benedictine monastery, became the first and mother-house of the Cistercian Order.

The monks of Molesme meanwhile repented their faults. They begged Pope Urban II to oblige Robert to return to them, which he did in 1099, and continued to govern them and to make Molesme a centre of strict Benedictine observance until his death in 1111.

Besides Cîteaux, Molesme founded seven or eight other monasteries (Note: including Aulps Abbey) and had about the same number of Benedictine nunneries under its jurisdiction. (Note: including Gy Abbey (Gy-les-Nonains)) The monastery with its church was destroyed and its possessions were confiscated in 1472 during the war between France and Burgundy. The buildings were again burned by the Huguenots towards the close of the sixteenth century in the French Wars of Religion. As a result of the reforms of St. Maur introduced by the Congregation of St. Maur in 1648, the spiritual life of the monastery was revived in the seventeenth century. The buildings were comprehensively restored during the 18th century, but the abbey was suppressed during the French Revolution and most of the buildings, including the abbey church, were destroyed.

== Present day ==
The principal survival is the Church of Sainte-Croix, built in the second half of the 13th century as a chapel for the abbey's novices, which remained in use as a church after the destruction of the rest of the abbey. In the 19th century a new belltower was constructed. The building was damaged in 1940 during fighting between French and German troops in World War II, and traces of this damage are still visible.

There are also some remains of service and ancillary buildings.

The abbey site has been a listed monument historique since 1985. It is accessible by prior arrangement only.
