= Christ on the Cross =

Christ on the Cross may refer to:

- Christ on the Cross (Rubens), a 1620 painting by Peter Paul Rubens
- Christ on the Cross (Rembrandt), a 1631 painting by Rembrandt
- Christ on the Cross (Murillo), any of a set of four paintings (c. 1760–1770) by Bartolomé Esteban Murillo
- Christ on the Cross (Delacroix), an 1835 painting by Eugène Delacroix
- Christ on the Cross (David), a 1782 painting by Jacques-Louis David
- Christ on the Cross (Zurbarán), a 1627 painting by Francisco de Zurbarán

== See also ==
- Crucifixion in the arts
- Crucifixion of Jesus
