= Lucedio Abbey =

Coordinates: 45°14′17″N 8°13′57″E

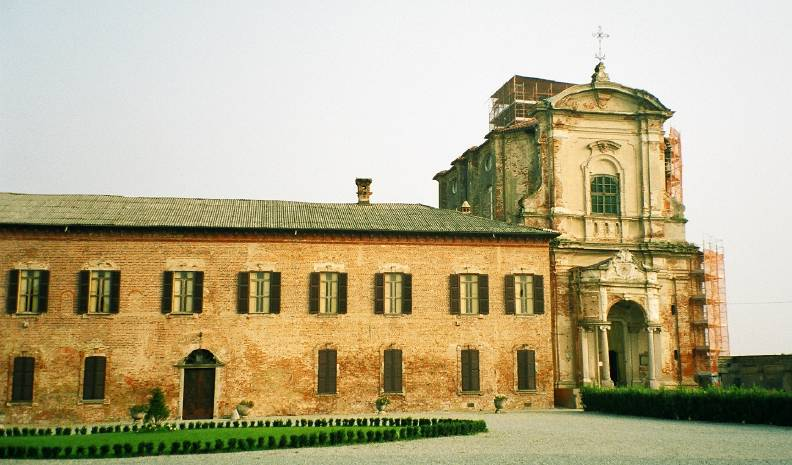
The Abbey Church undergoing restoration in 2005.

Lucedio Abbey (Italian: Abbazia di Santa Maria di Lucedio) is a 12th-century former Cistercian foundation near Trino, which is now in the province of Vercelli, north-west Italy. It played an important role in the development of rice production in the region.

== History ==
The abbey was founded in 1124, when Renier I of Montferrat provided an extensive tract of marsh, heath and woodland known as Locez, on whose agricultural development the future prosperity of Lucedio would depend.

As the second daughter-house of La Ferté Abbey (after Tiglieto Abbey, in the Ligurian Apennines), this was one of the earliest Cistercian monasteries in Italy. Lucedio contributed in its turn to the expansion of the Cistercian Order by giving birth to three daughter-houses over the next eighty years: Santa Maria di Castagnola Abbey in Chiaravalle (1147) in the Marche, Rivalta Scrivia (1180) near Tortona and Acqualunga (1204) near Pavia.

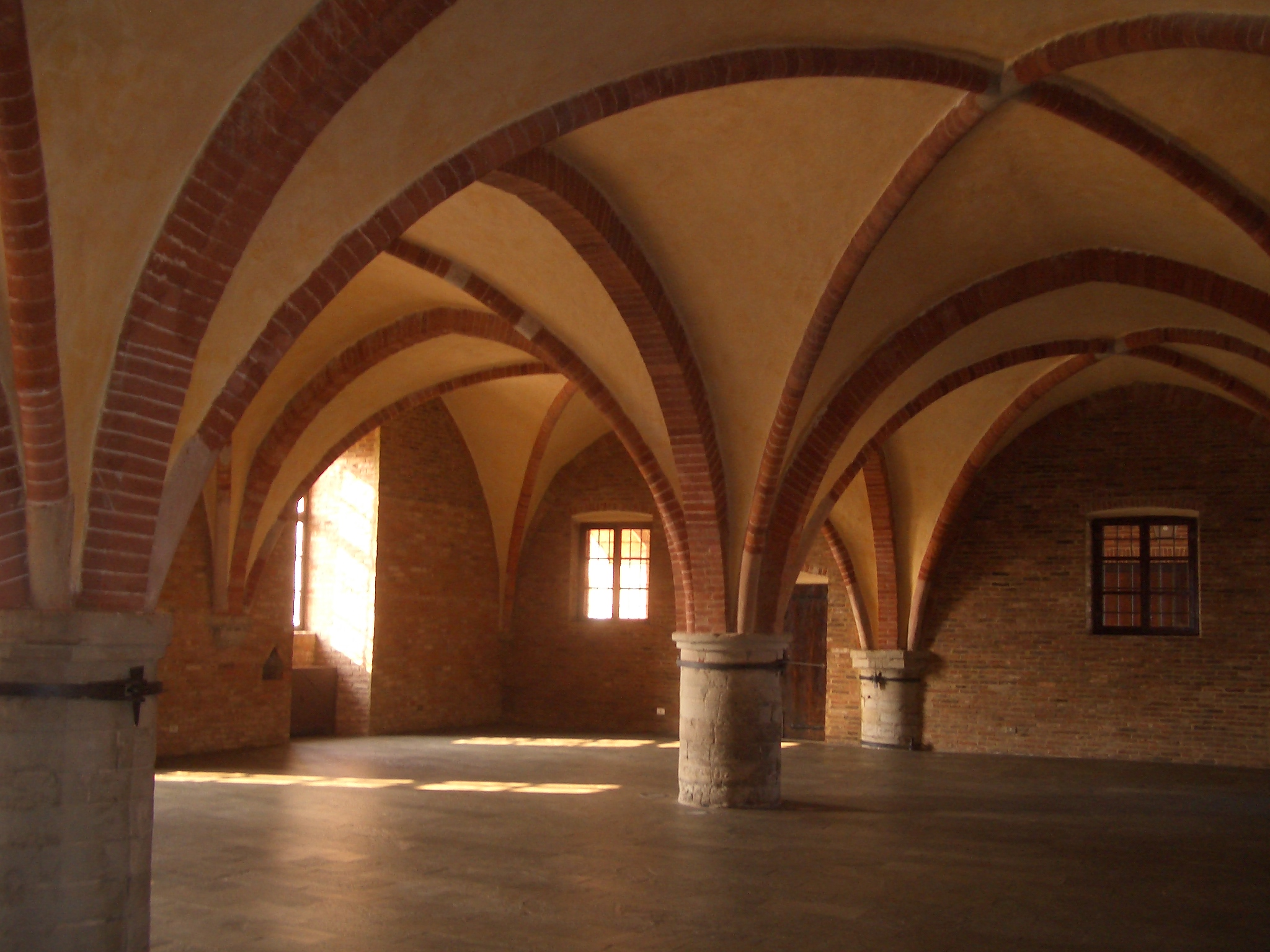
The refectory.

The Abbey's political ties to the Aleramici of Montferrat were shown in 1202 when its abbot, Peter II, accompanied the Marquess Boniface, grandson of Renier, on the notorious Fourth Crusade. After the sack of Constantinople in 1204 Boniface, as leader of the crusade, had expectations of being appointed the first emperor of the new Latin Empire. Abbot Peter was among the electors and is presumed to have been among the two or three who voted for Boniface. The crown, however, went to Baldwin, Count of Flanders, who had the support of the Venetians.

Thwarted in this ambition, Boniface and his crusaders conquered Thessalonica and was installed by Baldwin as king of the Crusader state, the Kingdom of Thessalonica, albeit under authority of Constantinople. Peter became Bishop of Ivrea (and later Latin Patriarch of Antioch) and his long-time associate Ogliero (who was later beatified by the Church) took his place as Abbot of Lucedio in 1205. The abbey then housed fifty monks. In 1214 two further daughter-houses of Lucedio were founded in the Crusader states: Saint George de Jubino in the Principality of Antioch and Chortaïton in Thessalonica.

The abbey managed its agricultural assets employing the grange system and was effective in developing the productivity of the land, notably introducing the cultivation of rice to this damp riverside area in the fifteenth century. Today the Vercelli region is one of the most important areas of rice production in Italy.

From 1457, by an act of Pope Callixtus III, Lucedio was placed under commendatorial control, losing prestige and autonomy.

The abbey was secularized in 1784, the remaining monks being transferred to a Jesuit college in Castelnuovo Scrivia. The buildings and their lands have passed through various hands in subsequent years, including those of Napoleon Bonaparte, who gave it to Camillo Borghese in exchange for a large quantity of artworks which are now housed in the Louvre. Later the former Abbey became a princely title of the Duke of Galliera. Today the abbey buildings are incorporated into a rice farm.

== Architecture ==
The original church dated to the founding of the monastery, and had become in danger of collapse. It was rebuilt between 1767 and 1770 in a baroque style, designed by the monk architect Valente de Giovanni. Its striking medieval bell-tower however remains intact: a rectangular base from 1150 to 1175 supporting an octagonal structure from perhaps a hundred years later. After the closure of the abbey, this became the town's parish church. It underwent extensive restoration work in the first decade of the 21st century.

== Notes ==
1. Marin, Şerban (2003). "The Venetian 'Empire'. The Imperial Elections in Constantinople on 1204 in the Representation of the Venetian Chronicles". Annuario. Istituto Romeno di cultura e ricerca umanistica (5). Archived from the original on 2009-10-21.
