= La Ferté Abbey =

Abbey in Saône-et-Loire, France

Coordinates: 46°41′29″N 4°51′33″E

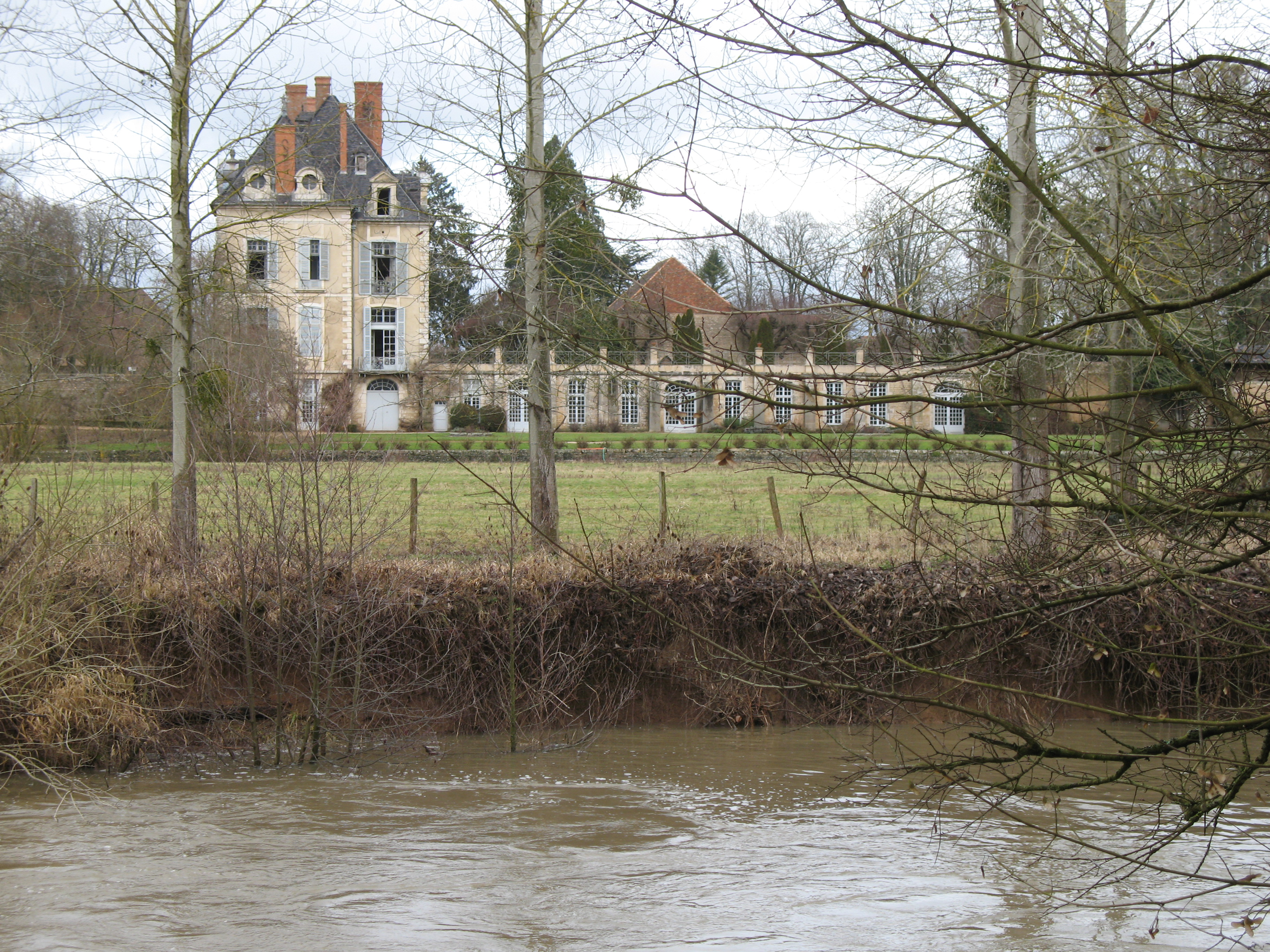
The former abbot's house, now the Château de la Ferté, the only significant surviving structure of the abbey

La Ferté Abbey (French: Abbaye de la Ferté; Latin: Firmitas) was a Cistercian monastery founded in 1113 in La Ferté-sur-Grosne in the present commune of Saint-Ambreuil, Saône-et-Loire, France, the first of the four great daughter-houses of Cîteaux Abbey. It was dissolved in 1791.

== History ==
The abbey was founded in 1113 by Stephen Harding as the first daughter house of Cîteaux Abbey, the mother house of the Cistercian reform. Along with Morimond Abbey, Clairvaux Abbey and Pontigny Abbey it was one of the four primary abbeys of the Cistercian order to which all other Cistercian houses were affiliated. It stood on a wild site located between the forest of Bragny and the swampy land of the Grosne.

It benefitted greatly from the generosity of the entourage of the Dukes of Burgundy and of the local nobility, especially the family of Gros de Brancion, and rapidly gained wealth and importance.

In 1165-66 it was caught up in the conflicts between Hugh III, Duke of Burgundy, and Counts Gerard of Mâcon and William of Chalon.

The conventual buildings were reconstructed in the 13th century.

In 1362 the abbey was occupied by the roaming brigands known as the Tard-Venus. It was fortified in 1415, but this did not prevent it from being looted in 1562 und 1567. In 1570 it was set on fire by the Protestant troops of Gaspard de Coligny; the only buildings to survive were the church, the sacristy, the chapter house and an adjoining room. The abbot François de Beugre obtained permission in 1574 to sell lands in order to fund the rebuilding. The final works - the construction of the dormitory and the redecoration of the church - were completed in the early 17th century under his successor, Yves Sauvageot.

In 1682 the abbot Claude Petit refurbished the abbot's lodgings and the cloister, while the fortification wall was demolished and the defensive ditch filled in. Further works were undertaken by the abbot François Filzjean de Chemilly in about 1760, principally to the frontage of the abbot's residence, which bears his arms.

The last abbot, Antoine-Louis Desvignes de la Cerve, commissioned a scheme of interior redecoration from the local architect Rameau, for which he granted him a pension.

The abbey was dissolved in 1791 during the French Revolution, by which time the community numbered only 14 monks, and some of the outbuildings were occupied by the workers, some of them women, from the cotton factory which had been established elsewhere on the site. The buildings were sold as national assets and largely destroyed, including the abbey church.

== Present ==
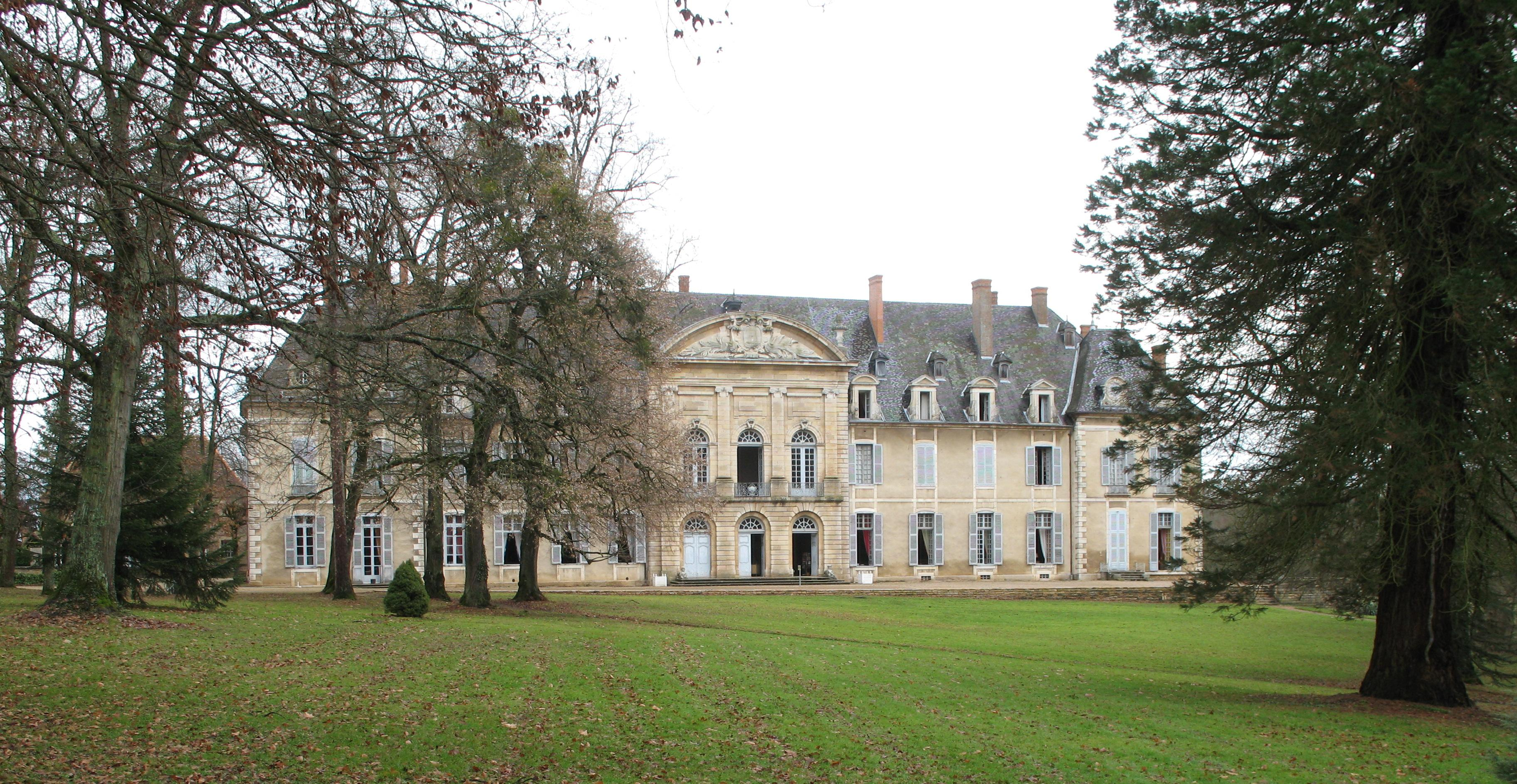
Front elevation of the Château de la Ferté

The only substantial survival of the premises is the 18th century abbot's house, now known as the Château de la Ferté, built on a slight elevation, with a two-storey central block of three bays, wings of four bays with mansard roofs and corner blocks of two bays. This building contains the original monastic refectory. It was listed as a monument historique in 1993.

== Daughter houses ==
La Ferté was the direct founder of five daughter houses:

- Maizières Abbey in France (with its daughter house Sturzelbronn Abbey)
- Tiglieto Abbey in Italy (with its daughter houses Staffarda Abbey and Casanova Abbey)
- Lucedio Abbey in Italy (with its daughter houses Rivalta Scrivia Abbey, Chortaiton Abbey in Greece and the Abbey of St George, Jubin near Antioch in Turkey)
- Barona Abbey in Italy
- St Sergius's Abbey in the Lebanon

== List of abbots ==
- 1113–1117 : Philibert
- 1117–1123 : Obizon
- 1123–1132 : Pierre I
- 1132–1171 : Barthélémy I
- 1171–1178 : Guillaume I
- 1178–1194 : Hervé de Faverney
- 1194–1199 : Bruno I
- 1198–1199 : Guillaume II
- 1199–1201 : Nicolas
- 1203–1205 : Eudes
- 1205–1206 : Pierre II
- 1206–1229 : Simon
- 1230–1232 : Boniface
- 1232–1233 : Vincent
- 1233–1234 : Guillaume III
- 1234–1239 : Robert
- 1239–1266 : Barthélémy II
- 1266–1276 : Jean I
- 1276–1285 : Gérard
- 1285–1297 : Rufin
- 1287–1317 : Pierre III de Montcalier
- 1317–1321 : Huges
- 1321–1341 : Jean II de Marcilly
- 1341–1346 : Bruno II
- 1346–1357 : Durand de Marcilly
- 1357–1371 : Claude I
- 1371–1385 : Pierre IV de Marcilly
- 1385–1392 : Guy de Saint-Romain
- 1392–1412 : Etienne I de La Chèze
- 1412–1416 : Guillaume IV
- 1416–1419 : Etienne II de Marcilly
- 1419–1439 : Jean III de Beaune
- 1439–1470 : Jean IV de Saint-Pierre
- 1470–1506 : Claude II de Dinteville
- 1506–1549 : Antoine I de Vienne
- 1549–1567 : René Dantoncour
- 1567–1569 : Elzéar de Rastel
- 1569–1574 : Louis de Breschard
- 1574–1600 : François I de Beugre
- 1600–1655 : Yves Sauvageot
- 1655–1677 : Pierre V Bouchu
- 1677–1710 : Claude III Petit
- 1710–1725 : Jean-Marie Vernois de Montjournal
- 1725–1733 : Jean-Charles Descriveux
- 1733–1761 : François II Filzjean de Chemilly
- 1761–1783 : François III Claude-Gaspard de Cannablin
- 1783–1791 : Antoine II Louis Desvignes de La Cerve

== Sources and external links ==
- Abbaye de la Ferté (in French)
- Certosa di Firenze: La Ferté
- Cistercium: La Ferté (in German)
- Auberger, Jean-Baptiste, 2000: La Ferté, in: André Vauchez (ed.), Encyclopedia of the Middle Ages. James Clarke & Co: Cambridge
- Peugniez, Bernard, nd: Routier cistercien (2nd edn), pp. 61–62. Editions Gaud: Moisenay ISBN 2-84080-044-6
