= Peter of Lucedio =

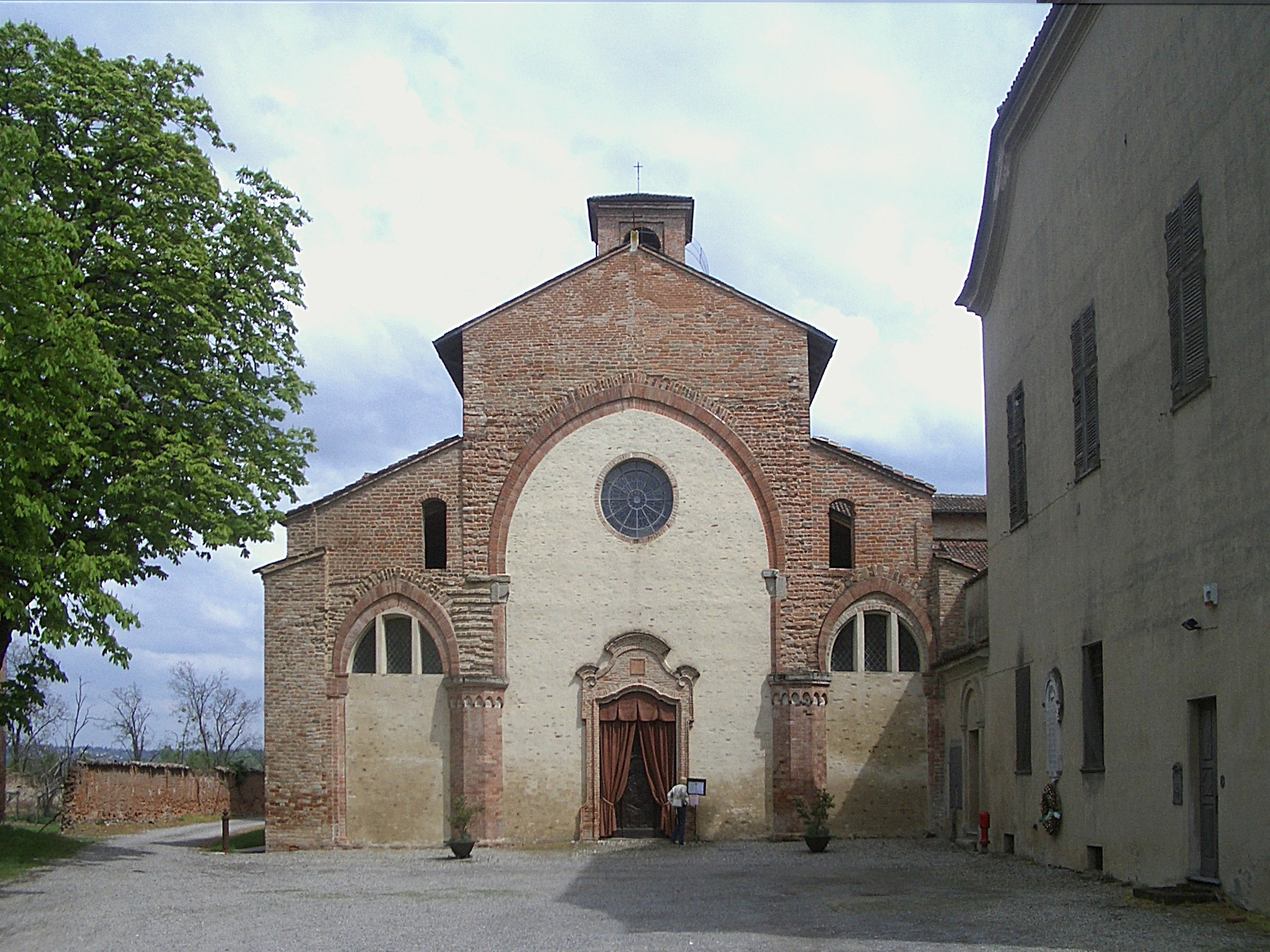
Abbey of Rivalta, where Peter's career began.

Peter (1140/1150 – 2 September 1216) was an Italian Cistercian monk and prelate. He was the abbot of Rivalta from 1180 until 1185, abbot of Lucedio (as Peter II) from 1185 until 1205, abbot of La Ferté (as Peter II) from 1205 until 1206, bishop of Ivrea from 1206 until 1208 and patriarch of Antioch (as Peter II) from 1209 until his death. He is known as Peter of Magnano, Peter of Lucedio or Peter of Ivrea.

Peter had a reputation as an administrator and mediator. He consolidated the properties of his abbeys and served several popes as a papal judge-delegate. He was on especially good terms with Pope Innocent III, in whose general reform of the clergy in Lombardy he played a major role. He participated in the Fourth Crusade and the establishment of the Latin Empire of Constantinople (1201–1205) and in the preaching of the next crusade in Lombardy (1208–1209).

== Abbot of Rivalta and Lucedio ==
Peter was born probably in the 1140s into a family of feudatories of the bishop of Vercelli associated with the town of Magnano. He had a brother named Obertus who was living in 1185. Peter was probably educated in the cathedral of Vercelli before entering the Cistercian monastery of Santa Maria di Lucedio. In January 1180 he became the first abbot of San Giovanni di Rivalta Scrivia, a church that became with Peter's appointment a daughter house of Lucedio and a subject also of the bishop of Tortona. During his abbacy in Rivalta, he established the monastic granges of Bassignana, Goide and Isello.

In 1185, Peter returned to Lucedio as abbot. He adopted a program of consolidating the abbey's properties. He obtained privileges of protection and confirmation from Popes Urban III (11 January 1186), Clement III (May 1188) and Celestine III (1192). He obtained a diploma of confirmation from the Emperor Frederick Barbarossa (14 February 1186). In April 1186, he obtained from Milo, bishop of Turin, an exemption from the tolls of Rivoli for the abbey's subjects. In February 1192, he obtained a confirmation of this exemption from Milo's successor, Arduin. He built up the manors of Montarolo, Leri, Ramazzana, Pobietto, Cornale and Gazzo in the region of Vercelli and won a dispute over property with the monastery of San Genuario.

Peter was close to the Marquis Boniface I of Montferrat, whose family, the Aleramici, had founded Lucedio in 1124. In 1193, when Boniface needed money, Peter gave him a loan with the forest surrounding the monastery serving as a pledge. For this, Peter was sanctioned by the Cistercian general chapter. In 1194, Bonifce drew up his will at Moncalvo in the abbot's presence. He left two farms and the mills at Trino to Lucedio.

Owing to his skills as an administrator, Peter served several times as a papal judge-delegate alongside Bishop Albert of Vercelli in the 1190s. On 20 July 1191, Albert and Peter handed down a judgement in favour of the cathedral of Genoa against the church of Santa Maria di Castello. In 1196, they were charged with settling a dispute between Boniface, archbishop of Genoa, and his cathedral chapter. The case dragged on until 1201. Sometime between 1195 and 1198, Albert and Peter settled a dispute between the canonry of Oulx and the monastery of San Giusto di Susa in favour of the former. In 1196, they were present at an imperial court in Mortara.

Pope Innocent III made extensive use of Peter in Lombardy between September 1198 and 1201, often without Albert of Vercelli by his side. Peter resolved disputes between the dioceses of Pavia and Piacenza in April 1199 and between Piacenza and Parma in May. With the abbot of San Salvatore di Pavia, he performed a canonical visitation of monastery of Bobbio in November–December 1199. In 1200, alongside Boiamondo, abbot of Chiaravalle della Colomba, he settled a property dispute between the bishop of Tortona and the Humiliati on the one side and the Knights Templar on the other. In late 1200 or early 1201, Innocent sent the representatives of the Humiliati to present their proposed rule of life (propositum vitae) to Peter and Albert. Their rule was approved in 1201. In that year he arbitrated a dispute between the monastery of Fruttuaria and its dependency, San Gemolo di Ganna.

== Fourth Crusade ==
In the spring of 1201, Peter joined the Marquis Boniface in the preparing for the Fourth Crusade. He was with Boniface at Soissons in the summer, where the marquis formally made his crusading vow before the assembling French army. He probably accompanied Boniface to Paris to meet King Philip Augustus as well. In September 1201, he was at Cîteaux to obtain the permission of the general chapter to go on the crusade with Boniface. There he presumably took a formal crusader's vow, although the record of the general chapter meeting does not list him among the abbots permitted to go on the crusade. In May 1202 he was back in Lucedio. He went with Boniface to Venice, where the army was gathering, and thence to Rome.

During their absence, the crusaders agreed to join the Venetians in an attack on Zadar. In September 1202, Peter was entrusted to carry back a letter from Innocent forbidding the attack on Zadar. It is not certain if Peter arrived in Venice before the army embarked, at Zadar before or during the siege or after the surrender of the city. It has been alleged that he deliberately withheld the letter from the army, but this is unlikely, since Peter retained the confidence of Innocent III until the pope's death. It is more likely that he gave the letter to Abbot Guy of Vaux-de-Cernay in Venice and that Guy read the letter before the leadership at Zadar.

Peter was with the army that arrived before Constantinople in June 1203. From then until March 1205 he was rarely far from Boniface. With Cardinal Soffredo of Santa Prassede, he convinced Boniface's new Greek wife, Maria, widow of Emperor Isaac II, to convert to the Catholic faith. In a letter addressed to the pope on 25 August 1203, the Emperor Alexius IV credited Peter, whose zeal he praises, as one of several who persuaded him to restore communion between the Eastern and Western churches.

After the assassination of Alexius and the Sack of Constantinople by the crusaders in April 1204, Peter was chosen to be one of the twelve electors (Note: The others were Nivelon, bishop of Soissons; Conrad, bishop of Halberstadt; Garnier, bishop of Troyes; John, bishop of Acre; Peter I, bishop of Bethlehem; and six Venetian barons.) for a new emperor from among the crusaders. Under Venetian influence, they chose Count Baldwin IX of Flanders. When Boniface went to conquer his Kingdom of Thessalonica, Peter followed him. Boniface rewarded Peter by granting him monastery of Chortaiton as a dependency of Lucedio, but Peter was called away by Innocent III in March 1205 to mediate between King Leo I of Armenia and Count Bohemond of Tripoli, who were disputing the succession to the Principality of Antioch.

== Abbot of La Ferté and Bishop of Ivrea ==
Peter returned to western Europe in 1205, after receiving news of his election as abbot of La Ferté, the mother house of Lucedio. He did not hold the abbacy for long, because he was elected to the bishopric of Ivrea in February or March 1206. He left La Ferté and took up his post in Ivrea, but as soon as he realized its poor financial situation he abandoned the diocese without informing the cathedral chapter, intending to take up life in a hermitage. A letter from Innocent III, dated 21 October 1206, caught up with him and persuaded him to return. He was consecrated as bishop sometime between 30 December 1206 and 11 March 1207. At the same time he was re-nominated as a papal judge-delegate.

As bishop, Peter mediated between the counts of Biandrate and the commune of Ivrea concerning some tolls, while at the same time protecting the rights of the diocese and of his old monastery, Lucedio, which had been granted toll exemptions by the counts. In the spring of 1207, Innocent III appointed him one of the "visitators and provisors of Lombardy" charged with a general reform of the clergy within that region. In this capacity, Peter worked with Albert's successor at Vercelli, Lotario Rosario, and Gerardo da Sesso, abbot of Tiglieto (a sister house of Lucedio). Together they imposed sanctions on the consuls of the city of Piacenza for having exiled their bishop, Crimerio, for unpaid debts. Sometime before March 1208, the three were in Albenga to verify accusations against Bishop Oberto. In November 1208, he was back in Piacenza with Gerardo and Archbishop Umberto IV of Milan to depose Crimerio for having given in to the consuls' demands. In December 1208, Innocent charged him and Gerardo with the task of formally deposing the bishop of Albenga. He also charged Peter, Gerardo and Bishop Sicard of Cremona with preaching a new crusade in Lombardy, which ultimately became the Fifth Crusade.

On 28 June 1208, Innocent III offered Peter the metropolitanate of Thessaloniki, but he refused it. In early 1209, Peter I, patriarch of Antioch, died, having been imprisoned by Bohemond during the succession dispute that Peter had been unable to resolve back in 1205. Innocent left the choice of a successor to the patriarch of Jerusalem, who happened to be Peter's predecessor, Albert of Vercelli. Albert selected Peter and Innocent informed him on 5 March 1209 that Peter had been transferred from Ivrea to Antioch. Before leaving Ivrea, Peter made a few donations to the cathedral chapter. He left in May or June 1209 and stopped in Rome on his way. There Innocent entrusted him with letters addressed to the cathedral chapter of Antioch, the clergy of the patriarchate and the garrison of Cursat Castle.

== Patriarch of Antioch ==
Innocent III praised Peter for accepting the patriarchate of Antioch out of "love and the virtue of obedience" rather than for worldly advancement, ambition or prestige. In Antioch, Peter found the disputed succession unresolved with Bohemond in actual control of the principality. A planned arbitration in August 1210 never came to fruition because Sicard of Cremona, one of the arbitrators, failed to come east.

In order to navigate the disputed succession, Peter opened up communications with the emir of Aleppo, al-Zahir Ghazi. On 7 June 1211, in order to further this effort, the pope wrote to al-Zahir Ghazi commending Peter. The emir of Aleppo was not, however, a neutral but rather an enemy of the king of Armenia. The king had arranged for the election of a rival patriarch, who was deposed by Albert of Jerusalem on the pope's orders. In this situation, the pope wrote to Peter to encourage him to steadfastness. On 26 September 1212, the pope wrote again to express his full confidence in Peter.

From 1213 on, there is no more indication of Peter's activities. He was represented at the Fourth Lateran Council by a suffragan, the bishop of Tortosa. Perhaps he felt too old to undertake the long journey; possibly he was ill. The date of his death is given as 2 September in the necrology of Lucedio and it is known that an election for his successor had taken place by 31 August 1217, when Pope Honorius III annulled the choice of Pelagius of Albano and ordered a new election. Peter's death must have taken place on 2 September 1216.

== Sources ==
- Alberzoni, Maria Pia (1993). "Innocenzo III e la riforma della Chiesa in "Lombardia": Prime indagini sui visitatores et provisores" (PDF). Quellen und Forschungen aus Italienischen Bibliotheken und Archiven. 73: 122–178.
- Alberzoni, Maria Pia (2015). "Pietro di Lucedio". Dizionario Biografico degli Italiani (in Italian). Vol. 83: Piacentini–Pio V. Rome: Istituto dell'Enciclopedia Italiana. ISBN 978-88-12-00032-6.
- Andrea, Alfred, ed. (2008). Contemporary Sources for the Fourth Crusade: Revised Edition. Brill.
- Andrea, Alfred, ed. (1997). The Capture of Constantinople: The "Hystoria Constantinopolitana" of Gunther of Pairis. University of Pennsylvania Press.
- Angold, Michael (2014). The Fourth Crusade: Event and Context. Routledge.
- Longnon, Jean (1978). Les compagnons de Villehardouin: Recherches sur les croisés de la quatrième croisade. Geneva: Librairie Droz.
- Moore, J. C. (1987). "Peter of Lucedio (Cistercian Patriarch of Antioch) and Pope Innocent III". Römische Historische Mitteilungen. 29: 221–249.
- Phillips, Jonathan (2005). The Fourth Crusade and the Sack of Constantinople. Pimlico.
- Queller, Donald E.; Madden, Thomas F. (1997). The Fourth Crusade: The Conquest of Constantinople (2nd ed.). University of Pennsylvania Press.
