= Cesare Alessandro Scaglia =

Italian diplomat and art collector (1592–1641)

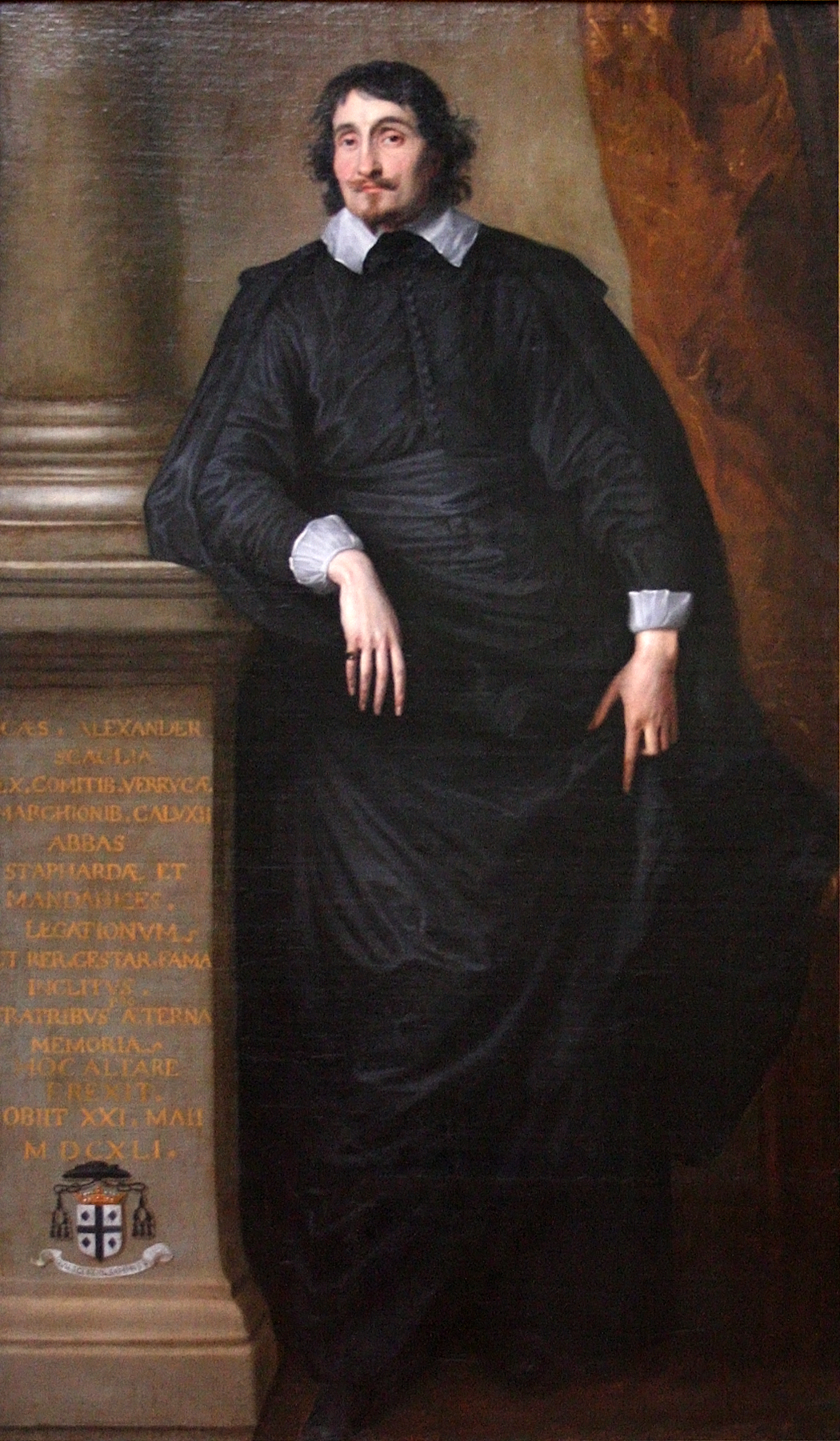
Scaglia by van Dyck, c.1634.

Cesare Alessandro Scaglia (1592 – May 21, 1641), also anglicized as Caesar Alexander Scala, was an Italian cleric and diplomat of the early 17th century. He was also abbot of Staffarda Abbey (from 1603), the Abbey of St. Justus in Susa (from 1613), and the Abbey of St. Pietro di Muleggio in Vercelli (from 1616).

Cesare Alessandro Scaglia (often known as Alessandro Scaglia or Abate Scaglia) came from an influential family in the Duchy of Savoy, the Scaglia di Verrua, who had risen to prominence since the ducal capital had moved from Chambéry to Turin in 1562.

Scaglia served as an ambassador for the House of Savoy in Rome, Paris and London, also collecting antiquities for the duchy. He was also in the service of Philip IV of Spain in London (acting on behalf of Spain up to 1636) and assisted Charles I of England in negotiating a commission on the subject of Cupid and Psyche from Jacob Jordaens for the Queen's House in Greenwich. However, his support of Spain led to tensions with Victor Amadeus I when he succeeded to the Duchy of Savoy in 1630, and soon afterwards Scaglia retired to Brussels and Antwerp, both in the Spanish Netherlands.

Peter Paul Rubens (a diplomat himself) described Scaglia as "a man of the keenest intellect". Scaglia was an art collector and commissioned a portrait, a Virgin and Child (showing Scaglia himself praying to them) and a Deposition (intended for his tomb) from Antony van Dyck whilst in Brussels and Antwerp. There were a total of five van Dycks in his collection, which also contained works by Peter Snayers and Antonio Tempesta.

== Early life ==
Scaglia was prepared from a young age for clerical life, as a younger son not expected to inherit his father's title of Count di Verrua. At age 11, he was made the abbot of Staffarda Abbey.

== Diplomatic career ==
Following in the footsteps of his father, Count Gherardo, Scaglia entered the diplomatic service of the Duke of Savoy, Charles Emmanuel I.

His first official mission as a diplomat was to Rome working under Cardinal Maurice of Savoy.

Campaigns were undertaken in 1619 and 1627 to have Scaglia created a cardinal to strengthen Savoy's influence in the Papal court, but although the first attempt even had French support, neither succeeded.

Scaglia spent a large portion of his career as a diplomat in France, but after the Treaty of Monzón undermined preexisting agreements between France and Savoy, he became increasingly antagonistic towards Cardinal Richelieu and any alignment of the two nations. During the rest of his career, he worked to improve relations with England and Spain, often mediating between England and Spain to combat French influence in Savoy that he saw as unacceptable.

Alessandro Scaglia was a known friend and political ally of George Villiers, the Duke of Buckingham, and made use of this connection to influence English foreign policy. In particular, he encouraged English support of the French Huguenot rebels during the 1627-1628 siege of La Rochelle as a diversion tactic against France.

A report from the Venetian ambassador in London, Alvise Contarini, documents an incident in which Scaglia temporarily fell out of favor with Buckingham:

The ambassador of Savoy is in disgrace with the duke. They were going to arrest near his house the wife of one of his brothers, who is said to be mad, in order to have her declared an adulteress, so that the son may not inherit from him, as he has no male heirs. The police even entered the ambassador's house, and the crowd rendered the proceeding a spectacle. In order to rid himself of all parties by a carnival trick, he had his page disguised in female attire, and accompanied by others of his household, made him get into his coach, which was completely closed, and away they went, the police and the whole crowd following for a space, thinking it contained the lady, who was making her escape. But when the passengers dismounted at a friendly house, into which the police followed, the trick played caused much amusement to the mob. The duke has taken great umbrage at this proceeding and refused the ambassador audience. He would not even accept a present of pictures which Scaglia sent him. The ambassador no longer frequents the Court, and indeed there is so much bad blood that it will be hard for it to resume its former channel.

— Alvise Contarini, "Venice: January 1628, 11-20", Calendar of State Papers Relating To English Affairs in the Archives of Venice (1914)

Contarini's reference to "a present of pictures" also underlines the way in which Scaglia and others at the time used art and gifts towards diplomatic ends. Scaglia's influence in England waned after Buckingham's murder in 1628, though he still had a few contacts there. He also possessed unusual favor with King Charles I of England.

In his diplomatic correspondence, Scaglia is known to have made use of multiple numerical ciphers, a common practice in diplomacy and espionage at the time.

== Exile and death ==
After being recalled to Savoy, Scaglia left London, but decided to remain in Brussels, in the Spanish Netherlands, disobeying the summons. At this point nearly all direct communication between Scaglia and the Duke of Savoy ceased.

His time in Brussels has been described as a self-imposed exile, as his pro-Spanish sentiments made him unwelcome while Savoy was pursuing a pro-French policy. However, the location also positioned him to participate actively in international politics in an unofficial capacity. During this time, he continued to carry on correspondence with many influential diplomatic figures, and the government of Savoy may have considered him a potential means of realigning Savoy with Spain, should its French alliance have become untenable.

In or after 1637, he entered the Recollects Convent in Antwerp, where he died in 1641.
