= Morimond Abbey =

Abbey in Haute-Marne, France

Coordinates: 48°3′26″N 5°40′22″E

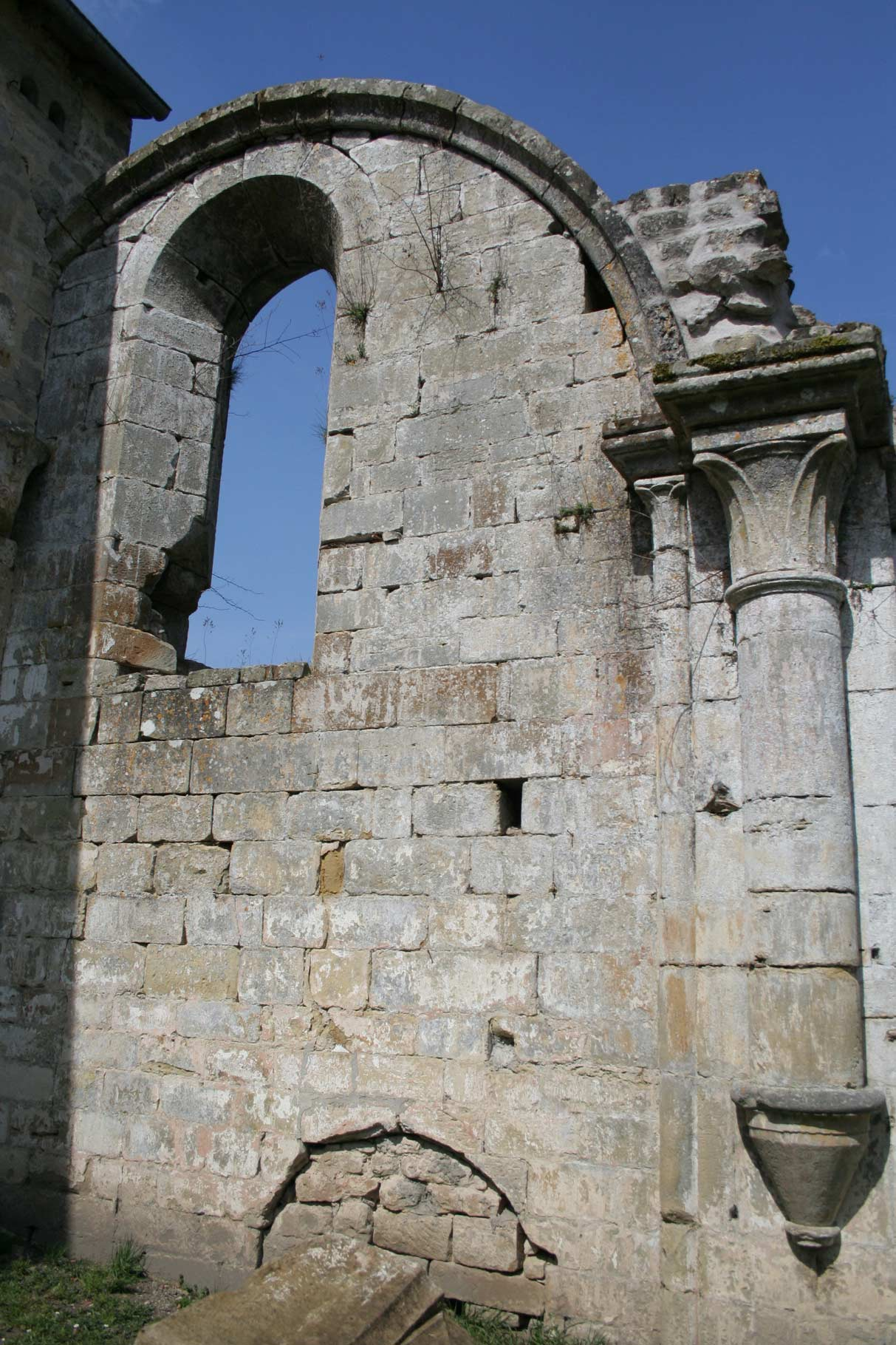
Ruins of the church at Morimond Abbey

Morimond Abbey is a religious complex in Parnoy-en-Bassigny, Haute-Marne department, in the Champagne-Ardenne region of France. It was the fourth of the four great daughter abbeys of Cîteaux Abbey, of primary importance in the spread of the Cistercian Order, along with La Ferté to the south, Pontigny to the west and Clairvaux to the north.

== History ==
Situated in the diocese of Langres, Morimond was founded in 1115 by Count Odelric of Aigremont and his wife Adeline of Choiseul and settled from Citeaux. The first abbot, known as a "pillar of the Cistercians", was Arnold the German. Thanks to his energy and influence, Morimond grew very rapidly, and established numerous colonies in France, Germany, Poland, Bohemia, Spain, and Cyprus. These included:

- Dore Abbey in England (1147)
- Ebrach Abbey in Germany (1126)
- Heiligenkreuz Abbey in Austria (1134)
- Aiguebelle Abbey in France (1137)
- Jędrzejów Abbey in Poland (c. 1140)
- Sulejów Abbey in Poland (1176)
- Wąchock Abbey in Poland (1179)
- Koprzywnica Abbey in Poland (1185)

Over the next two centuries Morimond continued to be active in the foundation of new Cistercian houses, so much so that towards the end of the 18th century, Morimond counted amongst its filiations nearly seven hundred monasteries and nunneries.

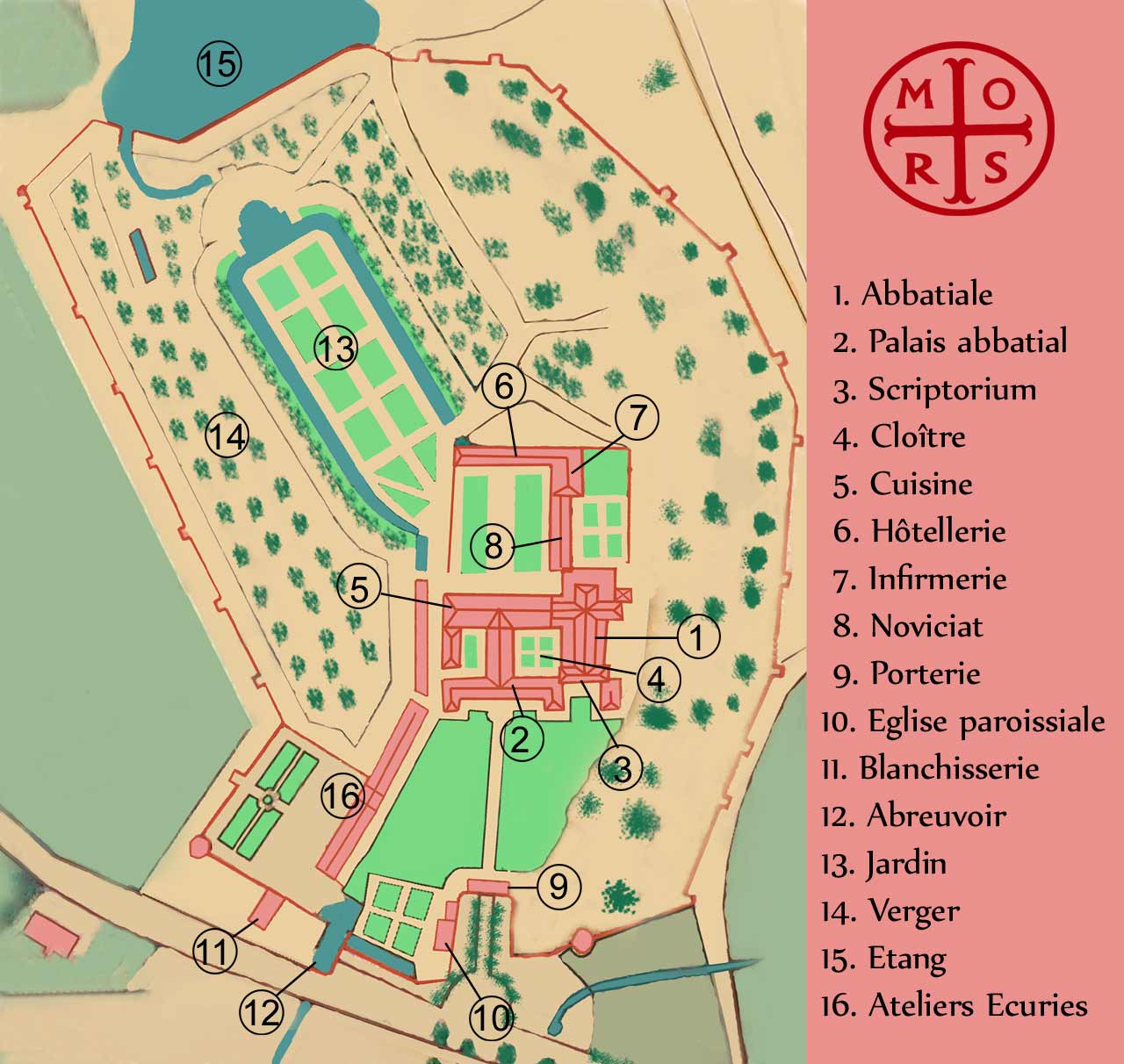
Reproduction of a 1789 plan of the abbey

Briefs from various popes placed the principal Military Orders of Spain under the spiritual jurisdiction of the Abbot of Morimond: the Order of Calatrava (1187); the Order of Alcantara (1214); the Order of Christ in Portugal (1319), and later on, those of the Orders of St. Maurice and St. Lazarus in Savoy.

The name "Morimond" is from the Latin "mori mundo", or "Die to the world": all who entered these Cistercian abbeys in the 12th century renounced worldly life. One of the famous men who passed through Morimond was Otto of Freising, son of Margrave Leopold III of Austria and his spouse Agnes, daughter of Emperor Henry IV. He studied in Paris and then entered the abbey, of which he became abbot. Pope Benedict XII, third of the Avignon popes (1334–1342), also began his career as a monk in Morimond.

The cruciform abbey church with three aisles and closed choir, the sides of which are occupied by chapels linked by a gangway, was built to be restrained and severe, according to the Cistercian building prescriptions, without towers or artistic adornment. In 1572, during the Wars of Religion, and again in 1636 in the Thirty Years' War, Morimond was destroyed; it was abandoned in 1791 in the French Revolution. Only the church survived, but fell into ruin during the 19th century.

== Remains ==
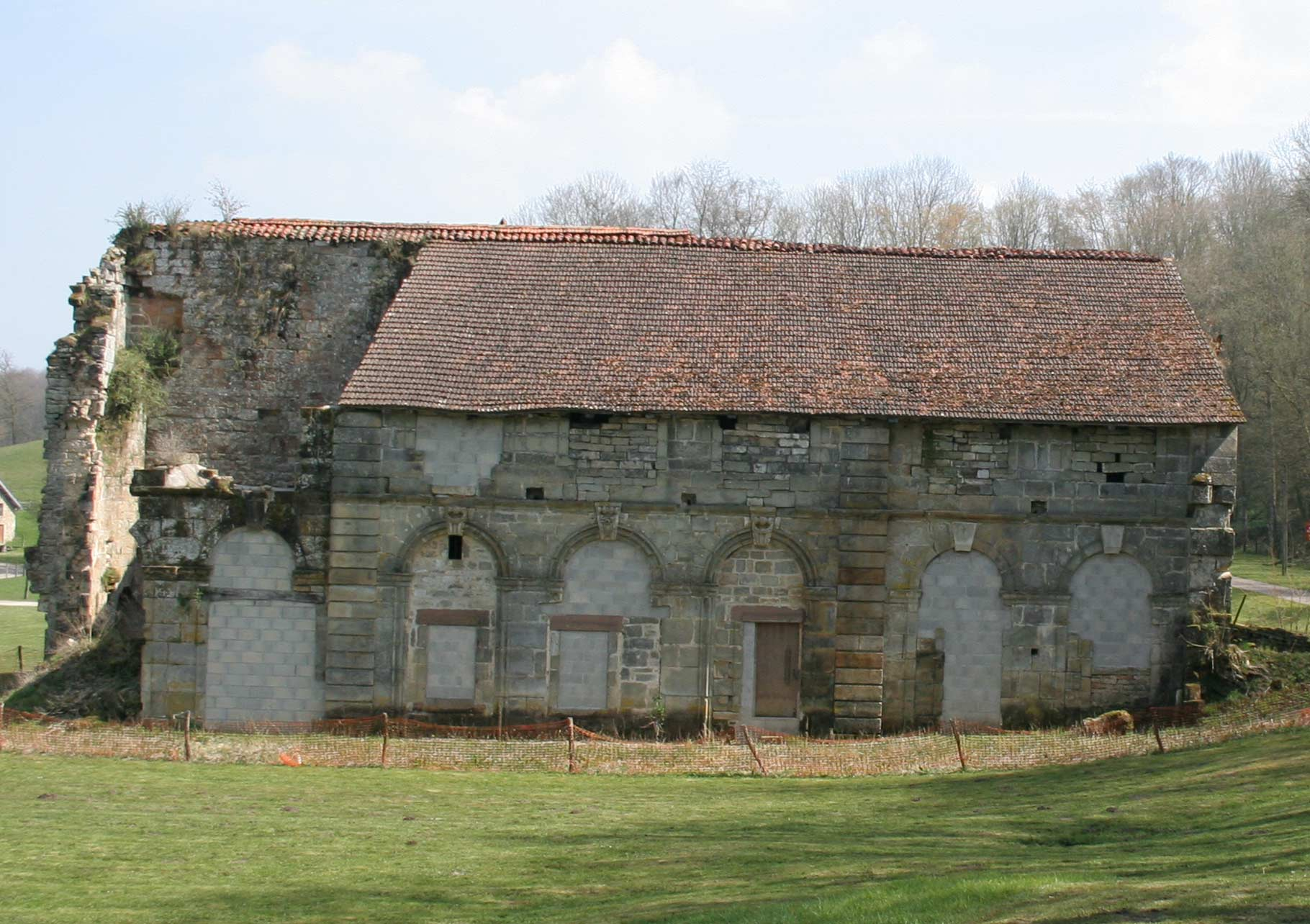
Ruins of the library at Morimond Abbey

Today, of the medieval structures, only a fragment of the north aisle is still standing, although there remain from the 18th century the gateway, the library and some pavilions and arcades.

== See also ==
Abbey Saint-Symphorien de Metz
