= Engarandus Juvenis =

Engarandus Juvenis, "Enguerrand the Younger" (fl. 1480s–90s) is a composer, presumed to be of French origin, whose three known works are all preserved in a single codex – the Codice di Staffarda – in the Cistercian monastery of Staffarda, Italy. He is notable as the composer of the earliest surviving example of a polyphonic setting of a Requiem mass complete with Dies Irae section.

== Lost records ==
No biographical information about the composer survives. The epithet "juvenis" "the Younger" suggests a connection to an older Engarandus (Latin), or Enquerrand (French), but no older composer of this name is recorded. Possible non-composer Enguerrands as fathers, or simply as comparison, in the previous generation include the chronicler Enguerrand de Monstrelet (c. 1400–1453) in Burgundy, and the painter Enguerrand Quarton (c. 1412–1466) of Laon in Provence. The fact that no other works survive by the composer suggest a local composer known to the point of origin of the Codex Staffarda - but the exact origin of the Codex Staffarda is unknown, beyond that it was Piedmontese and was compiled in the closing years of the 15th century. It is also unknown how it arrived at a Cistercian monastery, the Abbazia di Santa Maria in Staffarda. The presence in the codex of thirteen secular works suggests an origin at an aristocratic court rather than an origin at a monastery or cathedral, so a connection between Engarandus and a local ducal chapel, such as the Marquisate of Saluzzo under Ludovico I (died 1475) or Ludovico II (died 1504) is possible. A recording of the mass was made in 1995 by the Italian vocal ensemble Daltrocanto conducted by Dario Tabbia, and released on the French Opus111 label.
