= Primary abbey =

Daughter houses in the Cistercian order

Primary abbey in the context of the Cistercian order refers to the first daughter houses of Cîteaux Abbey. The four primary abbeys were La Ferté (1113), Pontigny (1114), Clairvaux (1115), and Morimond (1115).

== History ==
The primary abbeys, along with Cîteaux Abbey, were the epicentres of wide-reaching affiliations across Europe. In the 12th and 13th centuries daughter and granddaughter houses arose, which attached to Cîteaux as their mother house: this system of centralized control of the order was unknown before the Cistercians. By the death of St. Bernard of Clairvaux in 1153, there were in total 333 dependent houses, by the middle of the 13th century 647, and by 1675 742. Of these, 109 belonged to Cîteaux, 16 to La Ferté, 43 to Pontigny, 356 to Clairvaux, and 214 to Morimond.

From the later Middle Ages on, the influence of the primary abbeys became ever weaker, as national consciences became stronger.
