= Codice di Staffarda =

The Codice di Staffarda (I-Tn MS Ris.mus I. 27) is a musical codex from Staffarda Abbey (Santa Maria di Staffarda), a Cistercian monastery located near Saluzzo in north-west Italy, presently in the Biblioteca Nazionale Universitaria, Turin. The codex includes works by composers including the otherwise unknown Engarandus Juvenis and Antoine Brumel. In all, there are 48 pieces in the manuscript, including eight masses, eleven Magnificat settings, fourteen motets of various types and twelve chansons. The composers of only nineteen of these works have been identified, mostly by comparison with other sources.
