= Deposition (van Dyck, 1635) =

Painting by Anthony van Dyck

Lamentation over the Dead Christ
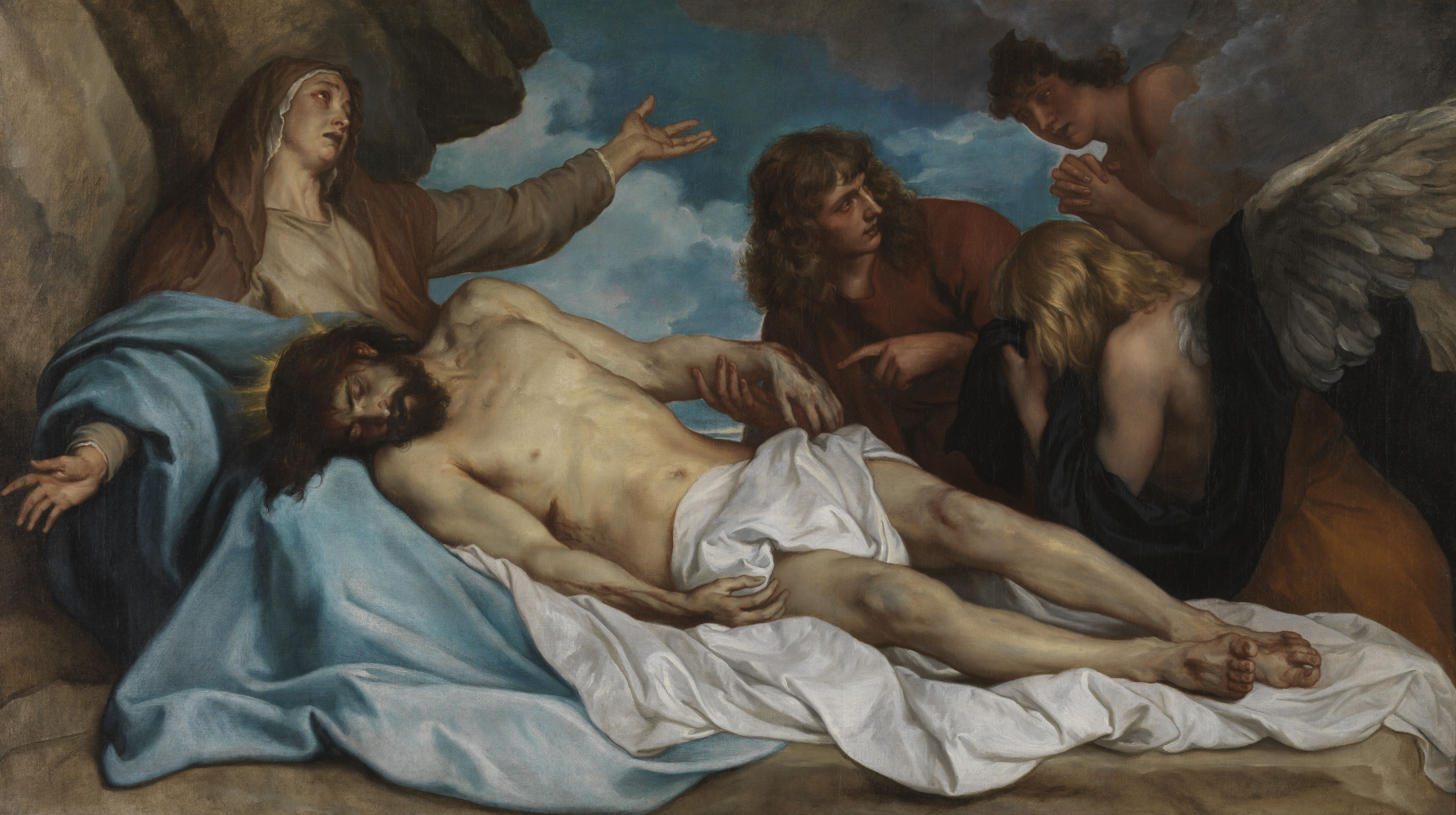
- Artist: Anthony van Dyck
- Year: 1635
- Medium: Oil on canvas
- Dimensions: 115 cm × 208 cm (45.2 in × 81.8 in)
- Location: Royal Museum of Fine Arts Antwerp; Antwerp

The Deposition or Lamentation over the Dead Christ is a painting by the Flemish artist Anthony van Dyck. Dating to 1635, it is one of his final treatments of the subject. It was commissioned by Cesare Alessandro Scaglia, who intended it to hang over his tomb in the Recollects Convent in Antwerp. It is now in the Royal Museum of Fine Arts Antwerp.

== See also ==
- List of paintings by Anthony van Dyck
