= Gerardo da Sesso =

12th-century Italian theologian, scholastic philosopher, bishop and cardinal

Gerardo da Sesso (c. 1160 – 16 December 1211) was an Italian monk, bishop and cardinal of the Catholic Church.

Gerardo came from a prominent Emilian family with Ghibelline leanings. He received a theological education, even penning a summa of his own, before joining the Cistercians. He was the abbot of Tiglieto from 1205 until 1209, bishop-elect of Novara from 1209 until his death and cardinal bishop-elect of Albano from April 1211 until his death. He was elected archbishop of Milan in 1211, but the election was irregular and he ignored it.

He was a staunch ally of Pope Innocent III. From when he was first made a visitator et provisor of the region of Lombardy in 1205 or 1206 until his death, he worked ceaselessly for the reform of the Lombard clergy. After 1210, in the contest over the imperial throne, he strove for the Ghibelline candidate, Frederick II, against the Guelph Otto IV. In April 1211, he was promoted to apostolic legate of Lombardy. One of his first legatine acts was to defend the Humiliati. He was never consecrated and was only ever a bishop-elect.

== Early life ==
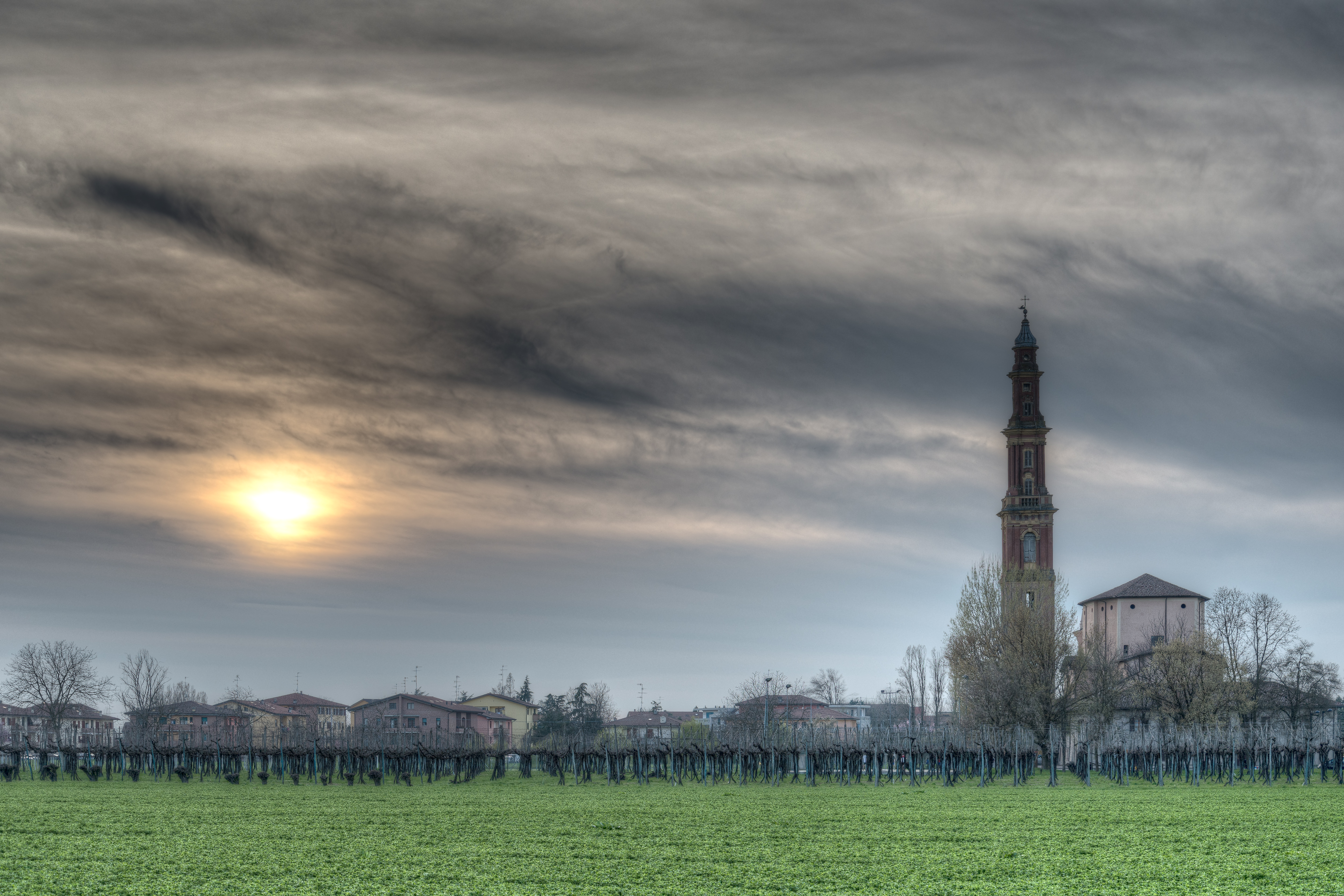
Sesso today

Gerardo (Note: Sometimes spelt Gherardo. The Latin form of his name found in contemporary documents is Gerardus de Sesso. It is anglicized Gerard of Sesso.) was born in Reggio nell'Emilia around 1160. The Da Sesso were a prominent Ghibelline family. They take their name from Sesso, north of Reggio.

By 1192, Gerardo held the title magister, indicating that he had completed some formal education, probably at either Paris or Bologna. He developed ties with the schools of Cremona under Bishop Sicardo (1185–1215) and may have worked as a teacher for a time.

By April 1192, Gerardo had entered the chapter of the cathedral of Parma, where his relative, Guidotto de Sesso, was provost. (Note: Kaeppeli considers him a canon and archdeacon of Parma, but Alberzoni is unsure of his exact status in the Parmesan chapter.) In that month, Pope Celestine III charged him with assisting the provost of cathedral of Reggio in resolving a dispute there. In 1199 or 1200, (Note: According to Miranda, he was provost of Borgo San Donnino from 1196 to 1203.) he left the cathedral for the Cistercian abbey of Tiglieto. By November 1205, he had been elected abbot.

== Reformer of Lombardy ==
=== Abbot, bishop and visitator ===
Shortly after his election as abbot, he was appointed visitator et provisor Lombardie by Pope Innocent III to conduct a visitation and inquisition of Lombardy as part of the pope's reform of the north Italian clergy. He was assisted in this by Bishop Lotario of Vercelli and the priest Alberto di Mantova, who was replaced by Bishop Pietro of Ivrea in 1207. He was first active in Novara, Ivrea and Asti; then from June 1206 in Milan, where he had to mediate between the archbishop and the treasurer. He investigated the conduct of Crimerio, the exiled Cistercian bishop of Piacenza, between 1206 and 1208. They imposed sanctions on Piacenza.

In March 1208, Gerardo, Lotario and Pietro passed a judgement against Bishop Oberto of Albenga. In November 1208, Gerardo, Pietro and Archbishop Uberto da Pirovano of Milan suspended Crimerio for having given in to Piacenza's demands. In December 1208, Innocent III ordered Gerardo and Pietro to depose the bishop of Albenga. He also charged Gerardo, Pietro and Bishop Sicardo of Cremona with preaching a new crusade in Lombardy, which ultimately became the Fifth Crusade.

Gerardo was selected by the consuls of Genoa to arbitrate their conflict with Pisa. On 19 March 1208, with another arbitrator, the abbot of San Galgano, he ordered the two cities to observe the peace handed down by apostolic legates in 1188. A truce was signed on 1 November, and on 26 April 1209, the arbitrators handed down a new peace based on that of 1188.

In late March or early April 1209, Gerardo was elected bishop of Novara. He accepted the election only upon the insistence of Innocent III and was never consecrated, (Note: He was ordained a priest at some point, according to Miranda.) remaining only a bishop-elect. He was forced to step down as abbot when he accepted the bishopric. Following the excommunication of the Emperor Otto IV in 1210, he worked for the cause of Frederick of Sicily as imperial candidate. In 1210, he arranged the election of Fulco Scotti to succeed Crimerio in Piacenza. He continued to act as visitator et provisor Lombardie until at least March 1211.

=== Cardinal and legate ===
In April 1211, (Note: Miranda dates his appointment to the consistory of May or June 1211, while noting that several authorities give the date of his appointment as unknown. Kaeppeli dates it to before 3 December 1210. According to him, Gerardo was already a legate by 29 October 1210.) Innocent III appointed him cardinal bishop of Albano and promoted him to apostolic legate in Lombardy. He was still not immediately consecrated. The earliest surviving document he issued as legate was drawn up at Trezzo sull'Adda on 19 April. Addressed to all the churchmen of his legation, it proclaims official approval of the Humiliati, encourages clergy to attend their meetings and forbids the clergy to interfere with them. Gerardo reached Novara by 29 April, but quickly left for Milan, where Uberto da Pirovano had recently died. On 4 May, he was elected archbishop, but neither he nor the pope ever accepted the election. As legate, one of his primary goals would be enforcing the excommunication of Otto IV and his agents.

Gerardo's name in a marginal note from a late medieval manuscript, citing his summa.

On 7 June 1211, accompanied by the abbot of Chiaravalle della Colomba, Gerardo was in Cremona to arrange the election of Giordano Forzatè to the vacant diocese of Ferrara. His effort failed. Giordano refused the election, and the Ferrarese were divided between those who favoured Otto and those who favoured Frederick. On 8 June, he intervened at Parma, where Bishop Obizzo Fieschi was in conflict with the cathedral chapter. He then tried to go to Bologna, accompanied by Sicardo of Cremona, but a Bolognese delegation met him at Modena and dissuaded him, because the same conflict between Otto's and Frederick's supporters was latent in their city. (Note: On 8 June, Innocent wrote a letter threatening to take away Bologna's university if the city did not support Frederick wholeheartedly.) Gerardo tried to force the resignation of Bishop Gerardo Ariosti of Bologna, but it took papal intervention in the following year to remove him. (Note: Ariosti was accused of consecrating the elected bishop of Imola as a deacon and a priest on the same day in violation of canon law.) In early July 1211, he went to Cremona to adjudicate a dispute between the abbey of Nonantola and the nunnery of San Benedetto. He then moved to Brescia, where he forced the bishop, Giovanni da Palazzo, to resign (Note: It took further intervention by Innocent III before Giovanni actually left.) and confirmed the apostolic protection of abbey of Santa Maria in Conche.

In October 1211, Gerardo held a diocesan synod in Novara, which promulgated stricter rules for the conduct of the clergy. (Note: The canons of this synod were approved by the pope on 3 December 1211.) The same month he ordered the canons of the cathedral of Piacenza to abide by their own rules. He was still in Novara on 31 October, but by late November, he was in Cremona, preparing to oppose the arrival of Otto IV. He died at Cremona on 16 December. (Note: According to Kaeppeli and Alberzoni, he died on 16 December 1211. Other sources place his death on 15 December or even in November 1211. According to Miranda, he witnessed a series of papal bulls from 3 December 1211 to 22 April 1212 and died shortly after.) He was buried at Cremona.

== Writings ==
Gerardo wrote a theological summa in Latin, known by its incipit as Ne transgrediaris. Its explicit is quod non fecit Adam and it is preserved in two manuscripts, Vat. lat. 10754 and Zwettl 305. It bears some resemblance to the writings of the contemporary Cremonese scholar Prepositino. It was written after the pontificate of Urban III (1185–1187), since it cites one of his decretals. A reference from 1181 to a summa Girardi donated to the cathedral of Novara is probably to a different work, or else to a very early edition of Gerardo's summa that he later revised. The most likely date for the composition of the summa is Gerardo's period at Tiglieto from 1200 to 1205.

Both manuscripts present the text without attribution, but a 15th-century catalogue of the Basilica of Santo Spirito in Florence names the author as Gerardus Novariensis (Gerard of Novara). The manuscript Vat. lat. 1104, a copy of Gregory of Rimini's Sentences, cites Ne transgrediaris in a marginal note, confirming the authorship of Gerardus Novariensis. .
