= Christ on the Cross (Delacroix) =

Painting by Eugène Delacroix

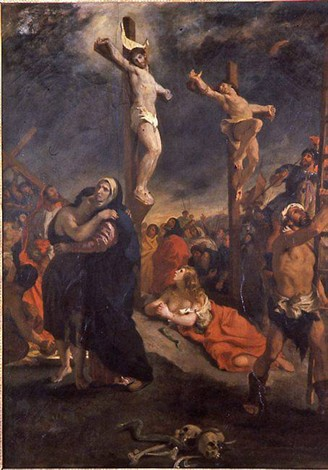
- Artist: Eugène Delacroix
- Year: 1835
- Medium: oil on canvas
- Dimensions: 182 cm × 135 cm (72 in × 53 in)

Christ on the Cross, also known as Christ Between Two Thieves or Calvary, refers to a series of paintings produced by the French Romantic painter Eugène Delacroix between 1835 and 1856. The paintings depict the crucifixion of Jesus.

Through each of his variations, Delacroix reinterpreted the crucifixion through a highly expressive, color-driven style influenced by earlier European masters.

== Major versions ==
Delacroix returned to the crucifixion theme throughout his career, producing major new versions in 1835, 1846, and 1853. In addition to these works, he produced numerous related sketches and variations. Delacroix created new versions of the work when commercial opportunities arose.

=== 1835 ===
The first painting was exhibited at the Paris Salon of 1835; it was purchased by the French state for 2,000 francs and assigned to Morbihan. It was later installed, against Delacroix’s wishes, in the Church of Saint-Patern in Vannes. After suffering damage and overpainting, it was eventually restored.

The composition of the 1835 departs from the iconographic convention of depicting Christ between the two thieves, instead showing only one additional figure on the cross. Christ is elevated at the center of the piece and his figure is illuminated by stark contrasts of light and shadow. Mary Magdalene is collapsed at the foot of the cross and this disordered drapery intensifies the emotional tone as well. There is also a darkened landscape and turbulent sky which are elements that heighten the drama of the moment.

The art historians Sébastien Allard and Côme Fabre relate the "tumultuous sensuality" of the painting to the influence of Rubens's painting of the same subject. They note that in Delacroix's version, the emphasis shifts from "the pathos of the Virgin" to the straining laborer at the right and Mary Magdalene at the foot of the cross.

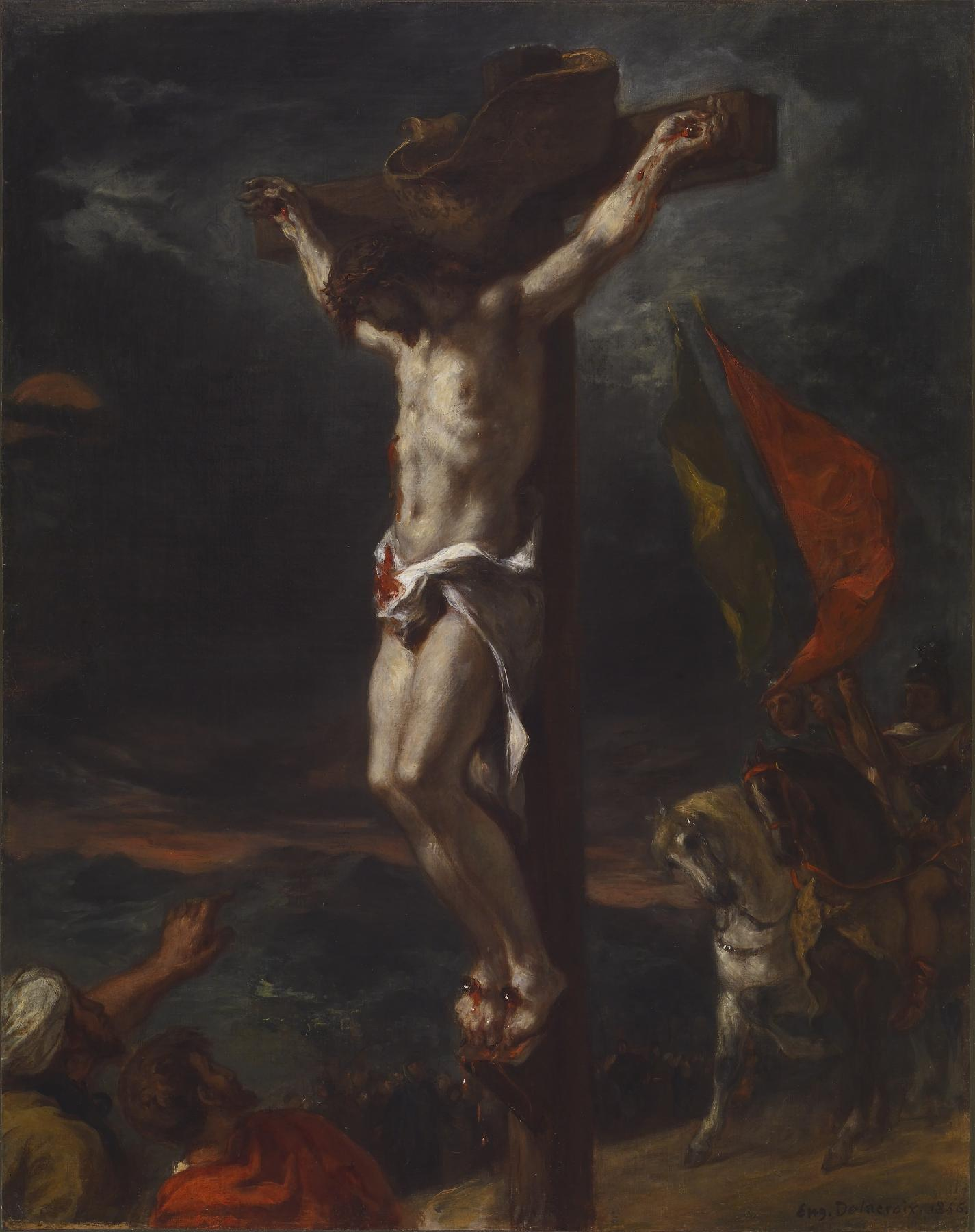
Delacroix, Christ on the Cross, 1846. Walters Art Gallery.

=== 1846 ===
In Delacroix’s 1846 crucifixion scene, Christ’s pale body with his face hidden stands out against cool blue shadows and becomes the painting’s main source of light when viewed from a distance. It looks stark and solid, but up close, the scene shows blood running from Christ’s hands down to his feet, painted with thick, multicolored strokes that make the effect almost disturbing. This red is echoed by the Roman knight’s crimson banner in the background. Even the sign above Christ’s head, traditionally naming the charges against him, is exaggerated and drooping, transformed into a snake-like embodiment of evil.

When the work was shown at the 1847 Salon, some critics noted that Delacroix had a great ability to depict genuine sadness. They also gave compliments about his color composition and the masterful technical execution displayed in this painting.

Delacroix created two pastel versions of the 1846 painting, one following its composition faithfully and the other reversing it.

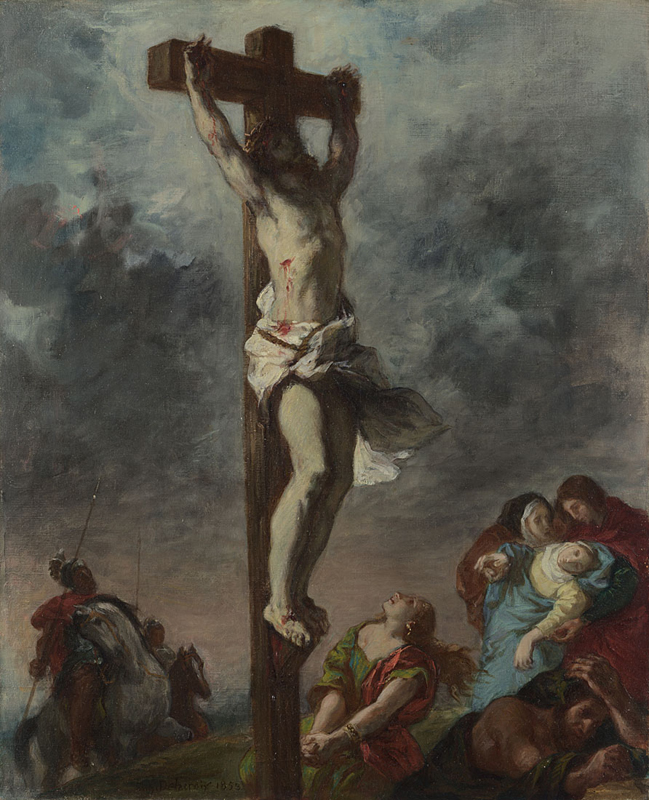
Delacroix, Christ on the Cross, 1853. National Gallery, London.

=== 1853 ===
Delacroix revisited Christ on the Cross again in 1853. In this new version, he flipped the composition of the 1847 Salon painting and replaced its dark, heavy atmosphere with the muted light of an overcast sky. Delacroix moved the Virgin Mary into the arms of John and her sister while placing Mary Magdalene at the foot of the cross, heightening the drama of the painting. The color palette is also notable, with the greenish-grey pale appearance of Christ’s body reflected in the grays and pink-brown tones of the stormy sky. Delacroix’s sketch-like brushwork adds energy and emotion to the work.

== Delacroix's aims ==
One of his initial motivations in creating these works was trying to attain the same stature as Renaissance and 17th-century masters in their portrayal of Christian themes. Delacroix is also said to have had a fascination with Christ’s "power of sacrifice" that gave rise to his affinity for painting Christ’s suffering. Another explanation for this affinity was presented by Charles Baudelaire in his review of the Salon of 1846, where he stated that "perhaps he alone, in this century of nonbelievers, has created religious paintings that were neither empty nor cold, like some works created for competitions, nor pedantic, nor mystical, nor neo-Christian."

Delacroix did not intend his scenes of martyrdom to be put in churches, where he believed they would be vulnerable to damage because of neglect or poor environmental conditions. Instead, he wanted them to be placed in museums next to masterpieces of religious art. The 1835 version of Christ on the Cross was sent to be in the church of Saint-Paterne in Vannes, where Delacroix's fears were realized. Twenty-five years later, Delacroix sent a message to the state finance minister, Achille Fould, expressing his concerns about the condition of the work:

I have learned that this work, long placed in a dark, damp chapel of the church [Saint-Paterne, Vannes], is threatened with complete destruction if the situation continues. I take the liberty of appealing to Your Excellency, to ask if it might be possible to have the city return the threatened painting to Paris. . . . In addition, it was suggested to me that the unfavorable place allotted to my painting might be explained by a Mary Magdalene figure that the clergy did not find sufficiently draped.

The painting suffered extensive damage and needed to be restored in 1864.

== Influences ==
Peter Paul Ruben is often cited as a major influence for Delacroix's Christ on the Cross. Delacroix took influence from Rubens’s masterpieces while he visited museums in France (Nancy, Bordeaux, and Rouen) and in Belgian churches.

Delacroix also reservedly admired Prud’hon Christ on the Cross. Although he generally preferred Prud’hon’s lighter, more graceful works, he acknowledged the emotional impact of the Christ on the Cross. This familiarity formed part of the broader visual context within which Delacroix produced his own Christ on the Cross in 1846.

Some other influences that have been noted are Jacob Jordaens, Rembrandt, Karel Dujardin, and Jan Lievens.
