= Staffarda Abbey =

Cistercian monastery near Saluzzo, Italy

Coordinates: 44°43′15″N 7°26′13″E

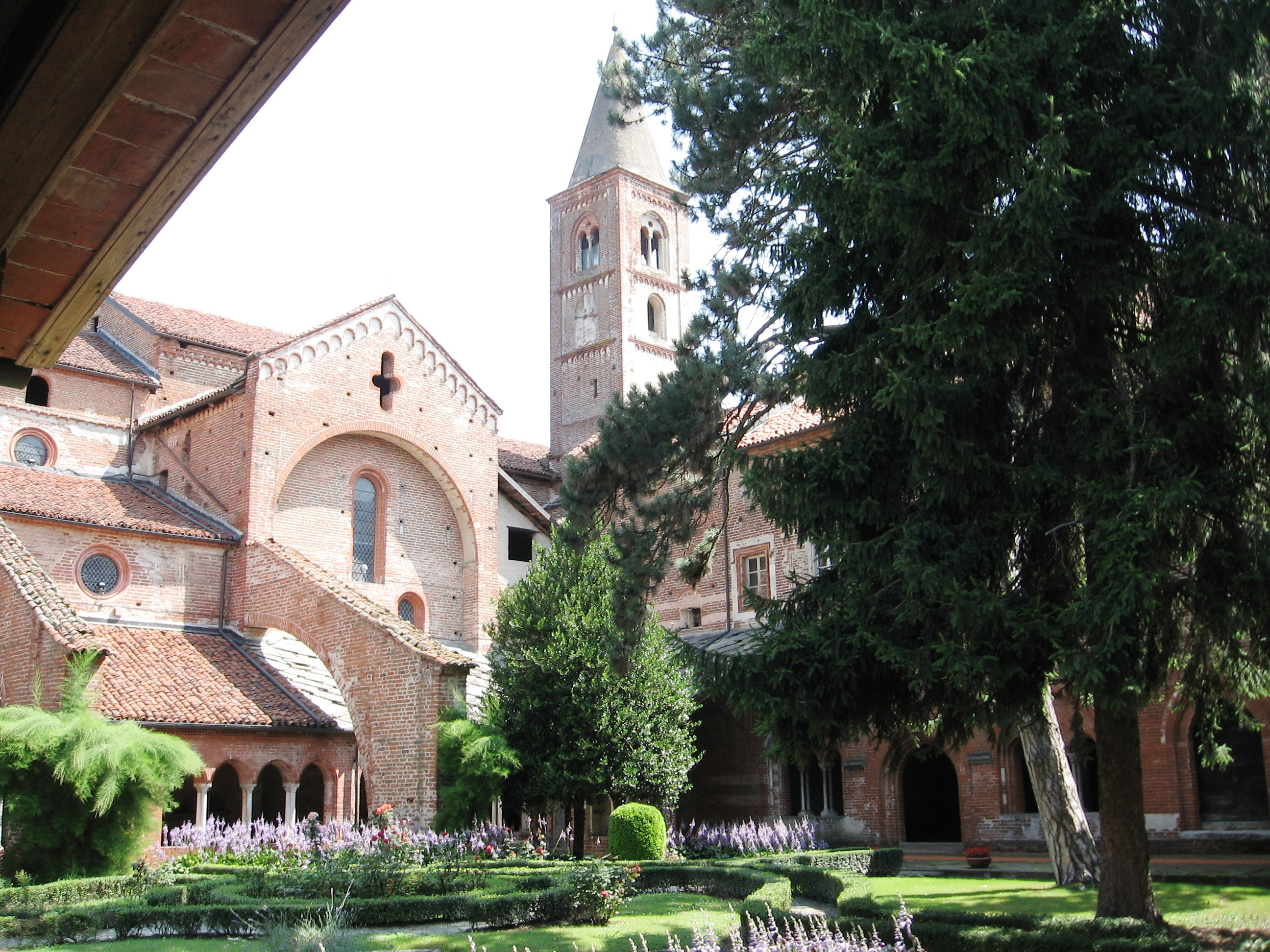
Abbey church

Staffarda Abbey (Abbazia Santa Maria di Staffarda) is a Cistercian monastery located near Saluzzo in north-west Italy; it was founded as a daughter house of Tiglieto Abbey in 1135 by Manfred I, Marquis of Saluzzo. The abbey became an important local centre for agriculture and held a flourishing market. It was placed in commendam to the Order of Saints Maurice and Lazarus in 1750.

A portrait of Cesare Alessandro Scaglia di Verrua, abbot of Staffarda, painted by Antony van Dyck in about 1634, is now in the National Gallery in London.

An important musical manuscript, the Codex Staffarda, dating to the 1480s or 1490s and containing reference to the commendatory abbot Brixianus Taparelli, is now in the National University Library of Turin. It includes polyphonic works by Renaissance composers such as Jacob Obrecht and Antoine Brumel, as well as the earliest surviving example of a polyphonic Dies Irae by an otherwise unknown composer, Engarandus Juvenis.
