= Chortaiton =

Monastery in Greece

The Monastery of Chortaiton (Greek: μονὴ Χορταΐτου) was a Greek Orthodox, and for a while Cistercian, monastery at Mount Chortiatis, near Thessalonica.

== History ==
The early history and background of the monastery is obscure. In literary sources it is first mentioned in the aftermath of the Fourth Crusade and the dissolution of the Byzantine Empire in 1204, but lead seals belonging to the monastery are attested from the second half of the 11th century on, when it was likely founded. By 1204, it was prosperous and had a community of 200 monks. In 1205, the King of Thessalonica, Boniface of Montferrat, gave the monastery over to the Cistercians, as a reward for the Cistercian abbot Peter of Lucedio, one of Boniface's followers during the Fourth Crusade. The Cistercians evicted the Greek monks, but their first abbot, known only by his initial, "G", looted the monastery, sold off its possessions, and fled. His successor, a certain Roger, proved no better, stripping the monastery of its wood furnishings to sell, and selling off its livestock. After the Greek monks complained to the Latin Emperor, Henry of Flanders, they were restored to the monastery in 1207 or 1208.

In 1322, the Despot Constantine Palaiologos fled to the monastery after popular riots in Thessalonica, and became a monk there. A settlement, modern Chortiatis, with a small fortress, emerged close to the monastery. In 1383, it was attacked by the Ottoman Turks, who attacked it again c. 1412 and razed it. During the 1422–1430 Siege of Thessalonica, the location was disputed between Ottomans and Venetians, but apparently captured by the former in 1428. The monastery is lasted attested in Ottoman sources in 1445, and likely ceased to exist shortly after.

== Location and remains ==
The monastery occupied the site of the modern village of Chortiatis, some 13 kilometres (8.1 mi) southeast of Thessaloniki. Its katholikon was located on the site of the modern primary school, where remnants are still visible. A mid-12th century church in the village, dedicated to the Transfiguration of Jesus, likely also belonged to the monastery complex. A tombstone of Michael Asen, son of the Bulgarian tsar Ivan Asen III, was discovered in the village.

== Possessions ==
The monastery held numerous estates throughout Macedonia, and subsidiary establishments (metochia), most notably a metochion in Thessaloniki itself, at the site of Chilia Dendra just outside the eastern city wall.

== Sources ==
- Agrigoroaei, Vladimir (2022). The Culture of Latin Greece: Seven Tales from the 13th and 14th Centuries. Brill. ISBN 978-90-0452422-4.
- Soustal, Peter (2022). Tabula Imperii Byzantini, Band 11: Makedonien, südlicher Teil (in German). Vienna: Verlag der Österreichischen Akademie der Wissenschaften. ISBN 978-3-7001-8650-2.
- Vakalopoulos, Apostolos E. (1939). "Ἤ παρὰ τὴν Θεσσαλονίκην βυζαντινὴ μονὴ τοῡ Χορταΐτου". Ἐπετηρὶς Ἑταιρείας Βυζαντινῶν Σπουδῶν (in Greek). XV. Athens: 280–287.
