= Recollects Convent, Antwerp =

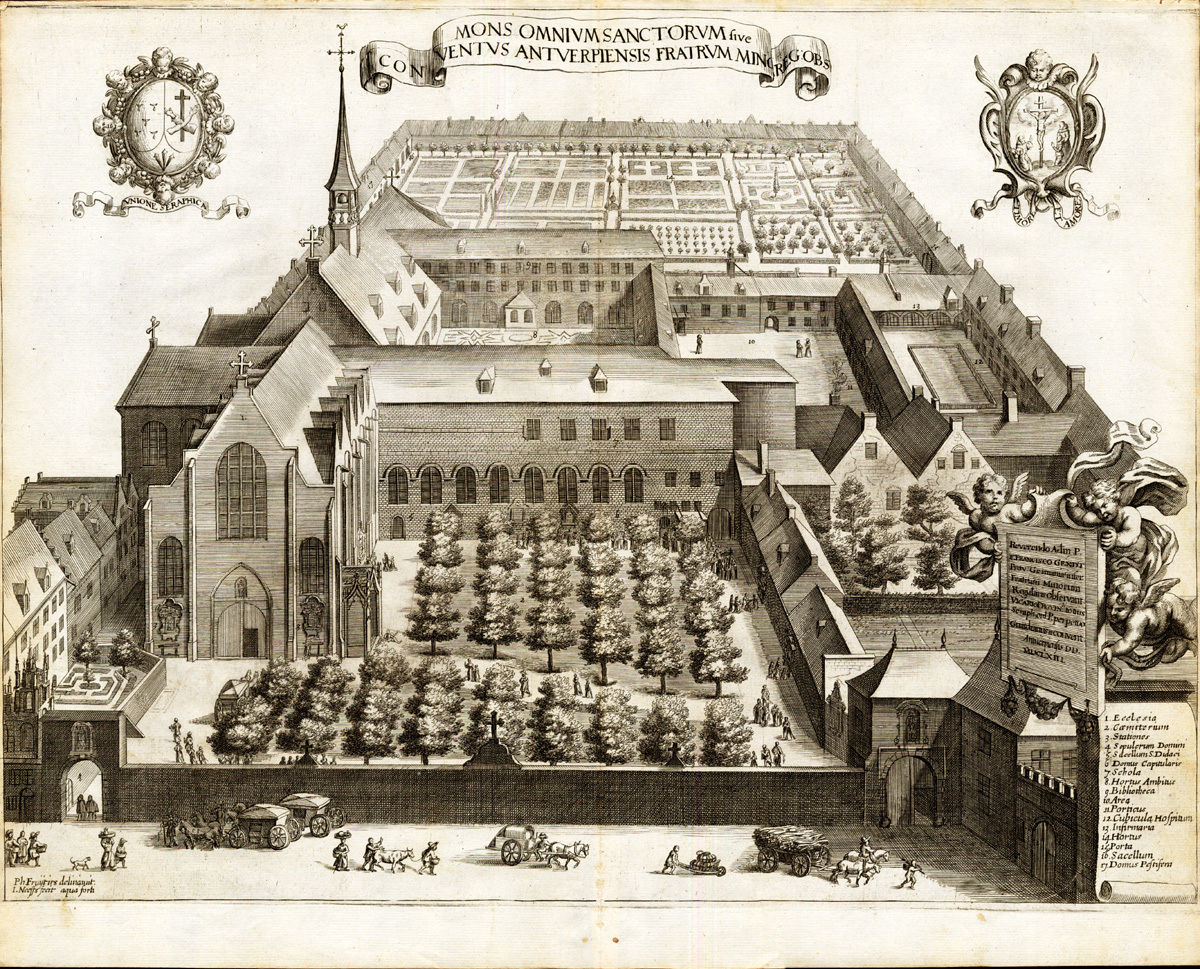
Convent of the Friars Minor 'Notitia Marchionatus Sacri Romani Imperii', 1678

The Recollects Convent (Minderbroederskerk) was a monastery of the Recollects order in Antwerp in Belgium. It was the original location of several works by Peter Paul Rubens (Christ on the Cross and The Incredulity of Saint Thomas) and Anthony van Dyck (Deposition). It was also the first home of the Royal Museum of Fine Arts until 1875, when the town council decided to rehouse it in a new purpose-built building.

== Burials ==
- Nicolaas II Rockox

== See also ==
- List of Catholic churches in Belgium
