= Christ on the Cross (Zurbarán) =

Painting by Francisco de Zurbarán

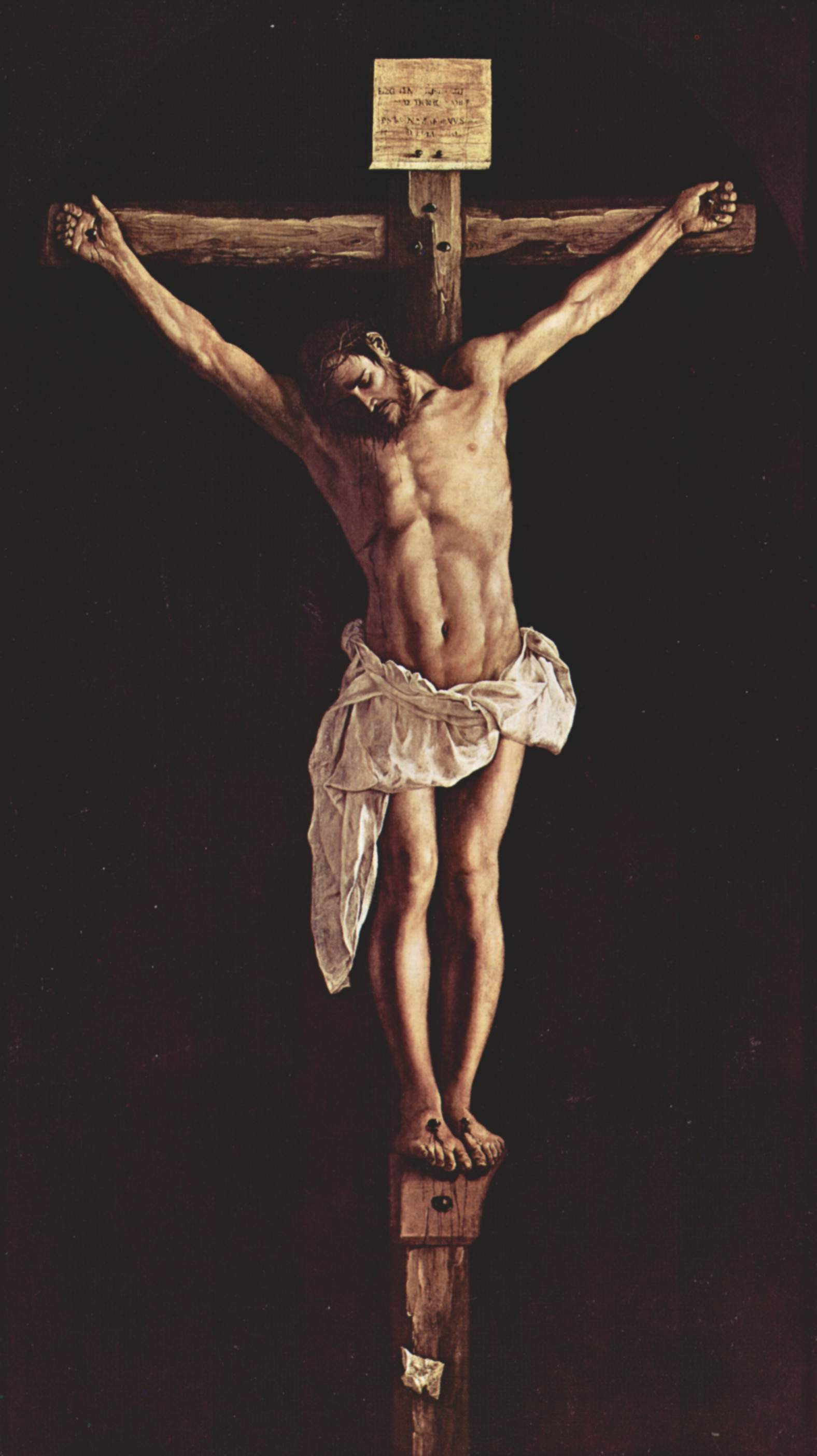
- Artist: Francisco de Zurbarán
- Year: 1627
- Medium: oil on canvas
- Dimensions: 290 cm × 168 cm (110 in × 66 in)
- Location: Art Institute of Chicago

Christ on the Cross is a 1627 oil painting on canvas by the Spanish painter Francisco de Zurbarán, now in the Art Institute of Chicago.

In 1626 Zurbarán signed a new contract with the Dominicans of San Pablo de Real Monastery in Seville to produce 21 paintings in 8 months. One of these was Christ on the Cross, which was so admired by the artist's contemporaries that Seville's city council suggested he moved there permanently in 1629.

As in Diego Velázquez's 1632 Christ Crucified, the artist shows Christ's two feet nailed separately – the number of nails used to crucify Christ was then a matter of controversy, with Bridget of Sweden writing of four nails. Both works also draw on a Counter Reformation trend after the Council of Trent to depictions focusing solely on Christ rather than those gathered around the cross.
