= Christ on the Cross (Rubens) =

Painting by Anthony van Dyck

Christ on the Cross between the Two Criminals or The Thrust of the Spear
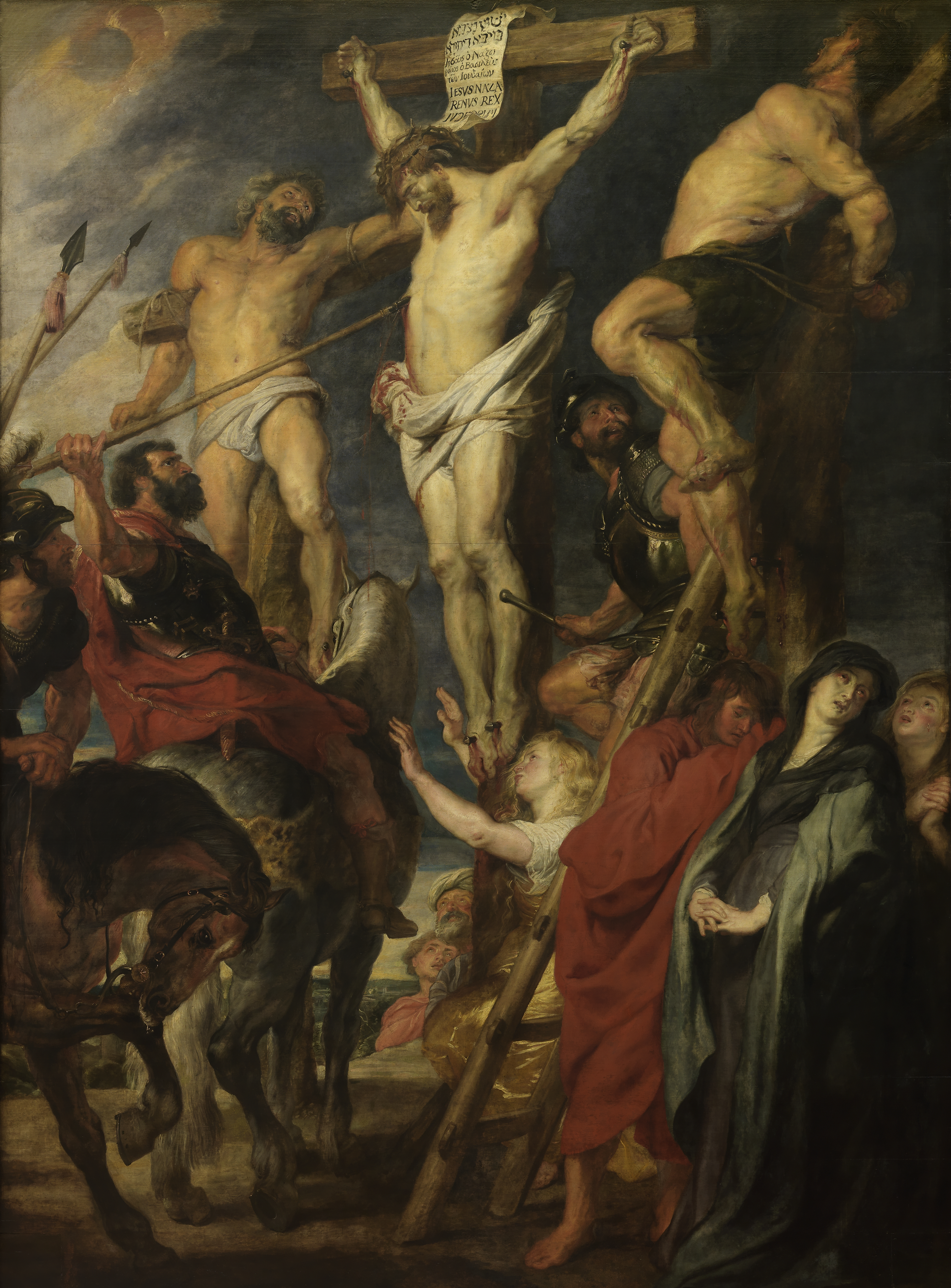
- Artist: Anthony van Dyck
- Year: 1620
- Medium: Oil on panel
- Dimensions: 429.6 cm × 310 cm (169.1 in × 120 in)
- Location: Royal Museum of Fine Arts Antwerp, Antwerp

Christ on the Cross between the Two Criminals or The Thrust of the Spear is a 1620 painting currently attributed to Anthony van Dyck. It depicts an episode during the Crucifixion of Jesus in which a Roman soldier pierces Christ's side with a spear to make sure he is dead. Traditionally attributed to Rubens, recent scholarship attributes it to van Dyck. The painting was originally commissioned for the church of the Convent of the Friars Minor Recollect in Antwerp. It is in the collection of the Royal Museum of Fine Arts Antwerp in Antwerp.

== Attribution ==
For centuries after its creation admired as an important masterpiece by Rubens, starting from the 19th century, art experts such as Max Rooses, Rudolf Oldenbourg and Gustav Glück questioned its attribution to Rubens and proposed a re-attribution to Anthony van Dyck.

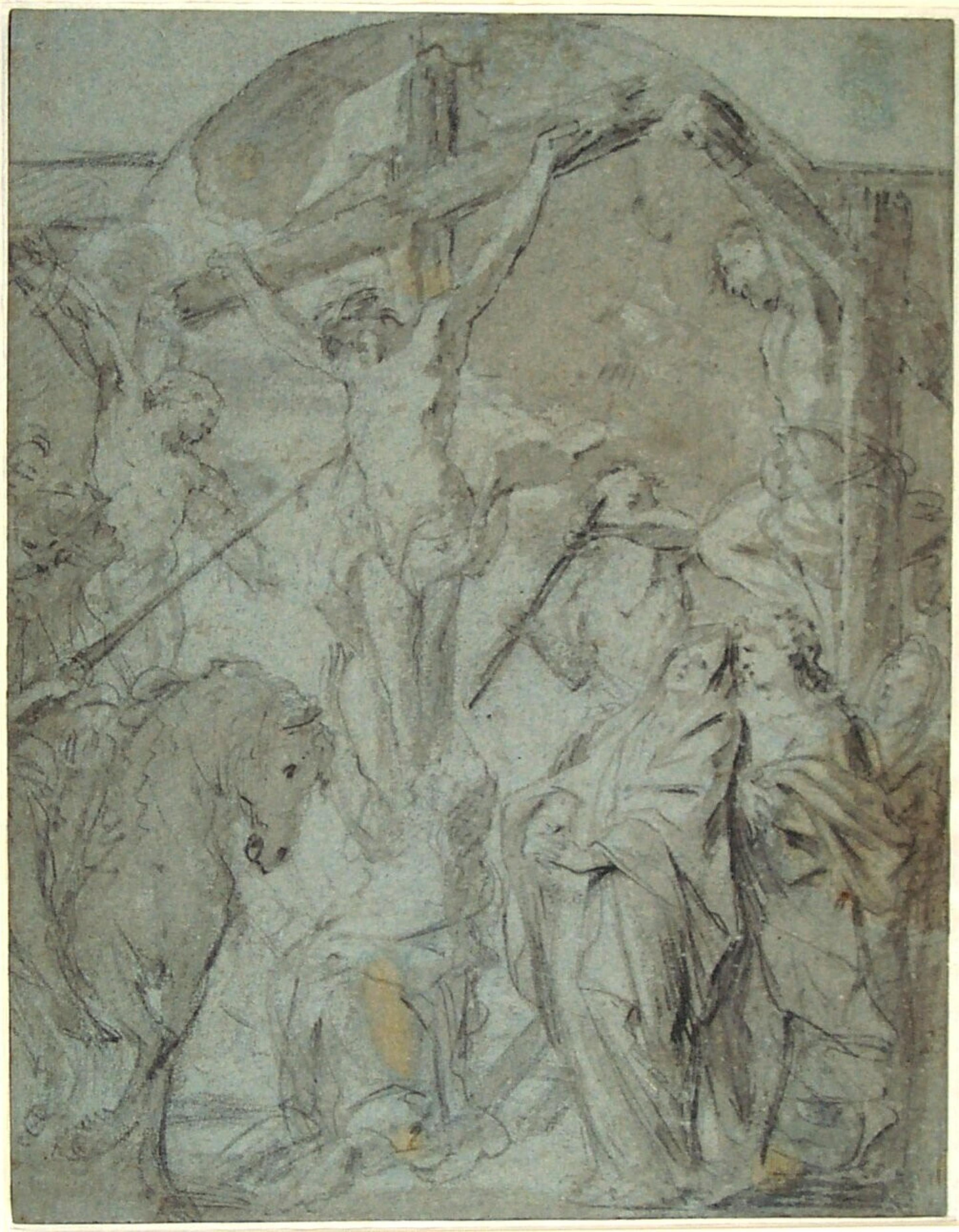
Preparatory drawing in the Museum Boijmans van Beuningen

It is known that around 1619, Rubens' good friend Nicolaas Rockox commissioned Rubens to paint the painting for the Church of the Friars Minor Recollect in Antwerp. At the time van Dyck was a collaborator in Rubens' workshop in Antwerp. Some preparatory studies for the painting display van Dyck's style and working method, such as the loose chalk sketch in the Museum Boijmans van Beuningen, Rotterdam and a sketch of the figure of Christ and the imploring Mary Magdalene in the Courtauld Institute, London. The grisaille oil sketch of the composition in the Victoria and Albert Museum, London further differs greatly from the manner in which Rubens painted his preparatory oil sketches. The thin, nervous brushstrokes in van Dyck's oil sketch evoke the sparse and nervous paint elevations found in Van Dyck's later oil sketches. Based on the aforementioned evidence for van Dyck's role in the creation of the painting, the Royal Museum of Fine Arts Antwerp has changed its attribution of the work to Anthony van Dyck working in the workshop of Rubens.
