= Christ on the Cross (Murillo) =

Paintings by Bartolomé Esteban Murillo

Christ on the Cross may refer to one of four oil on canvas paintings by the Spanish Baroque artist Bartolomé Esteban Murillo:

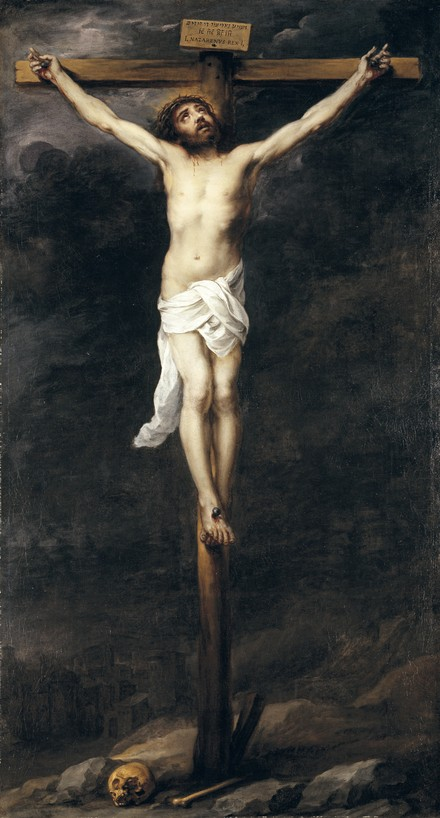
c.1660-1670, Timken Museum of Art

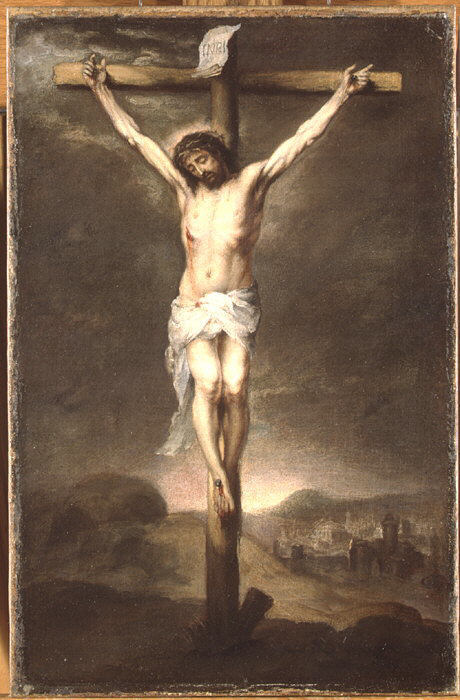
c.1675, Metropolitan Museum of Art

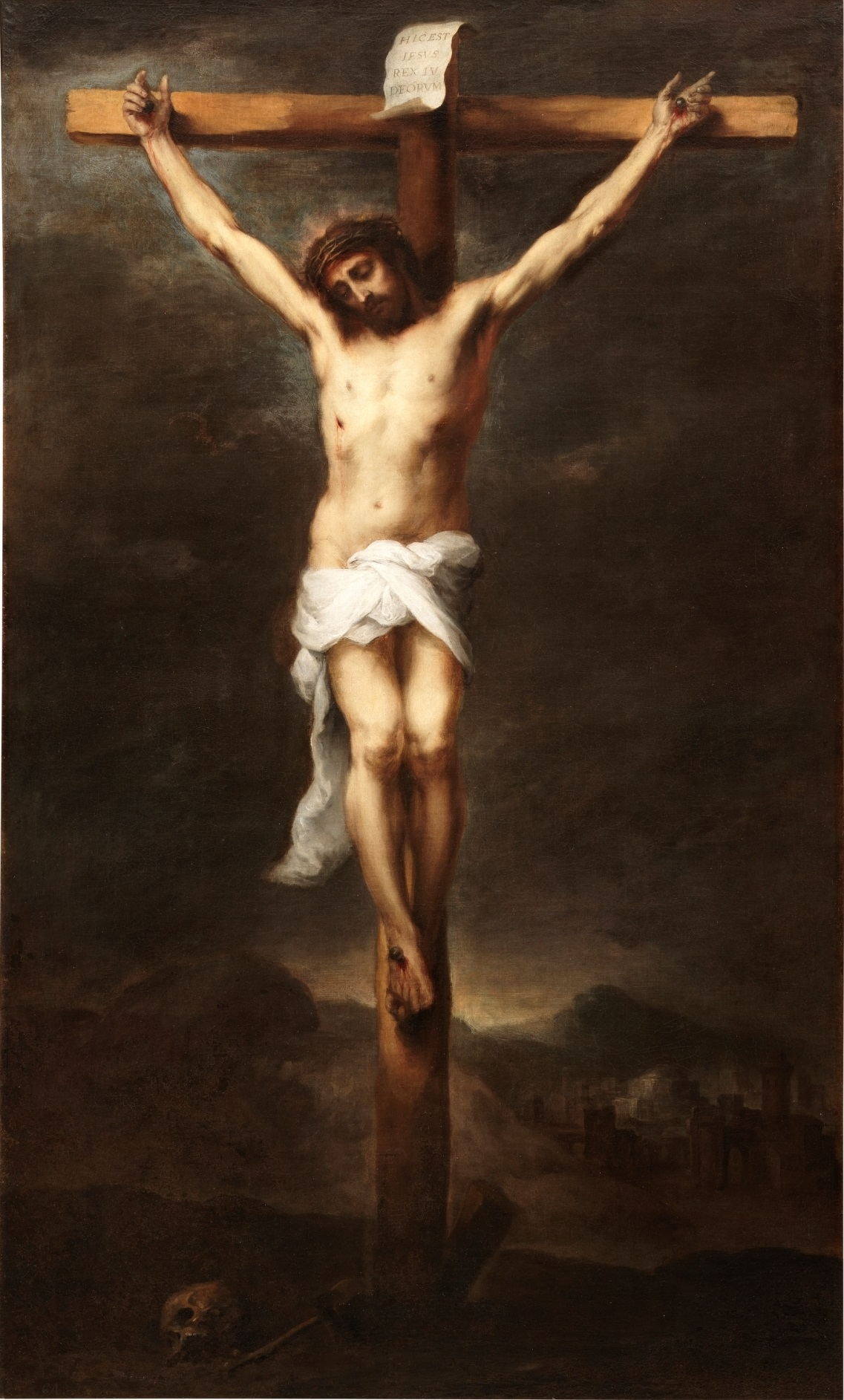
c.1675, Prado Museum

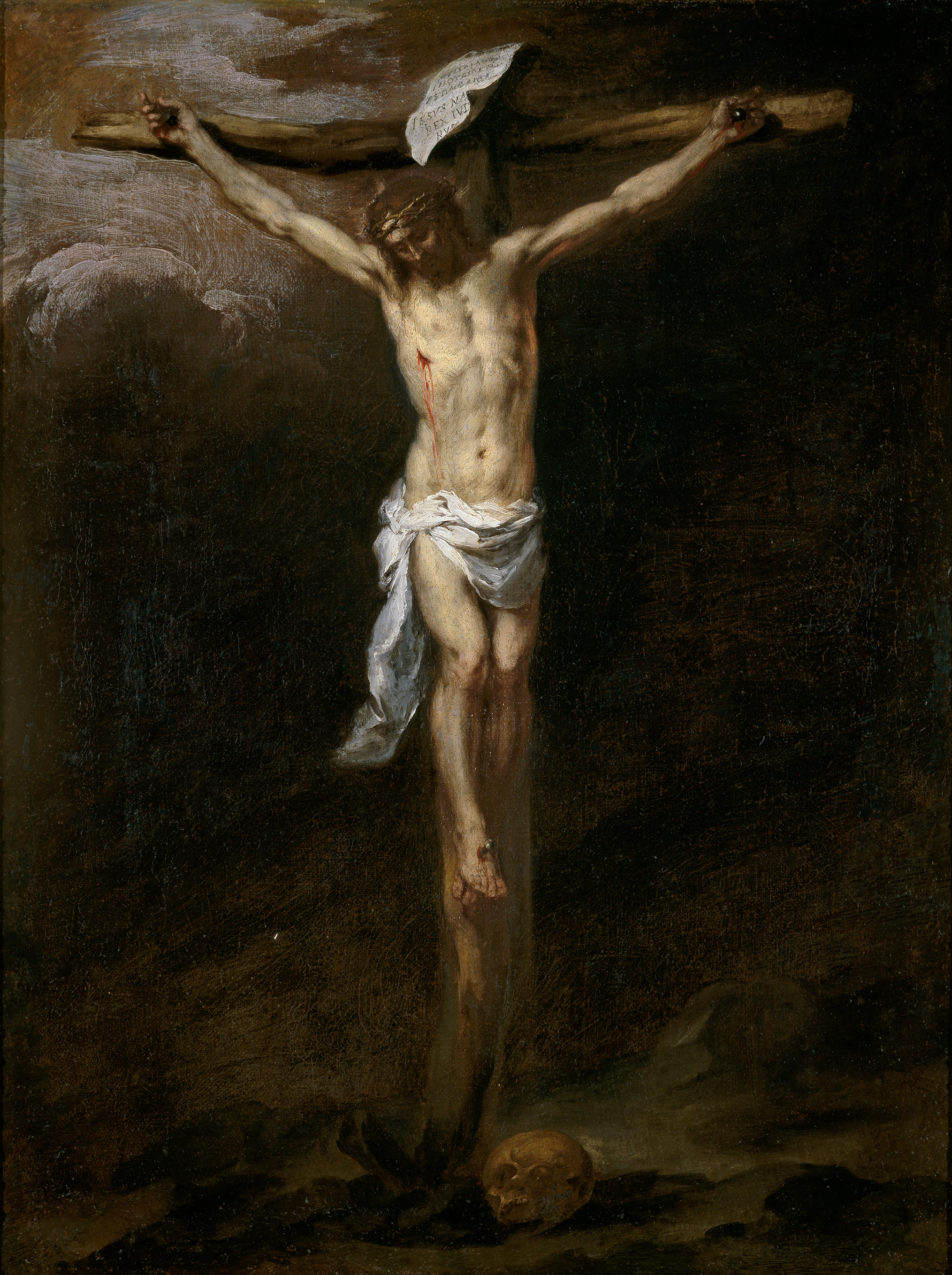
c.1677, Prado Museum
