= Pontigny Abbey =

Church in Burgundy, France

Coordinates: 47°54′34″N 3°42′52″E

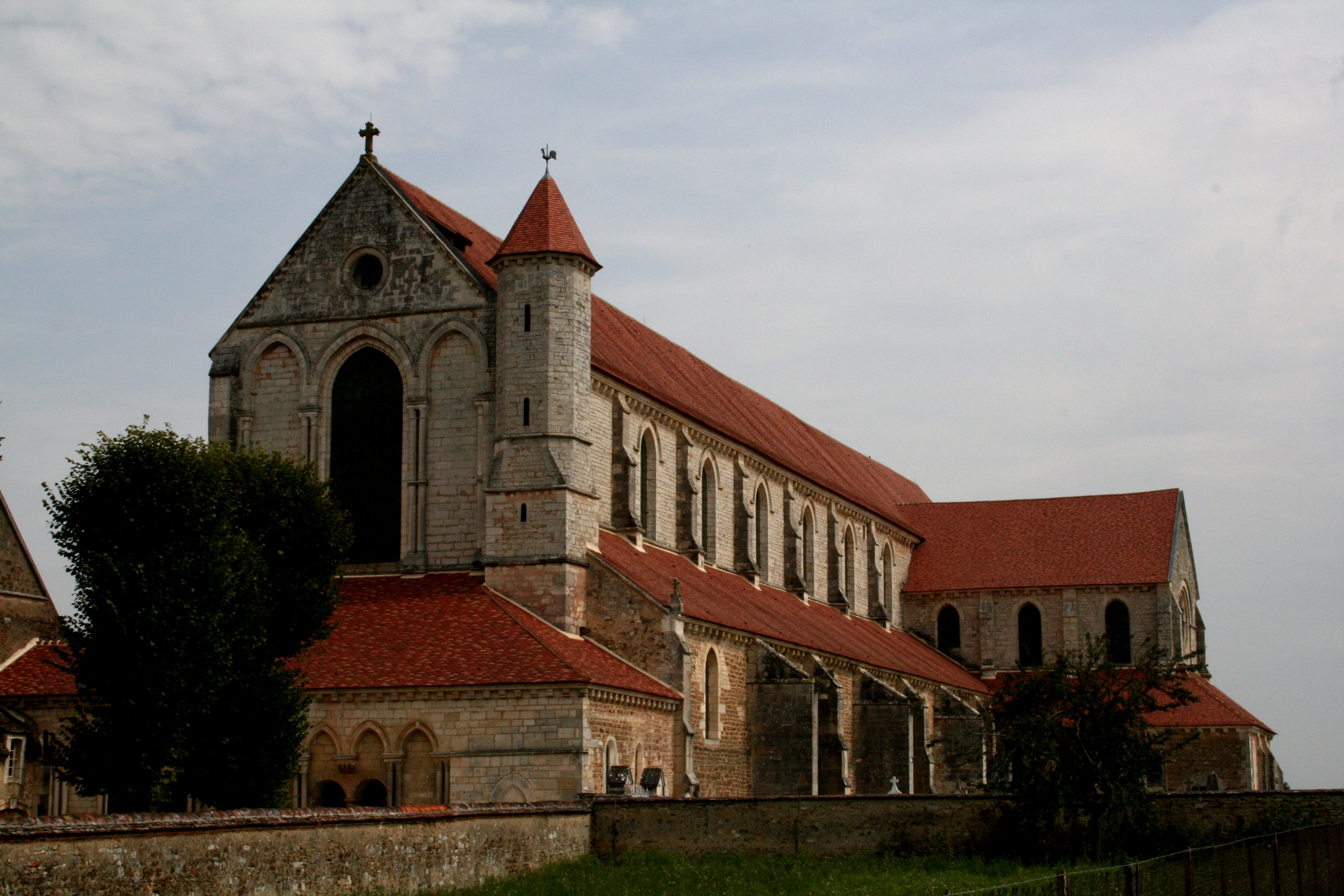
Pontigny Abbey church

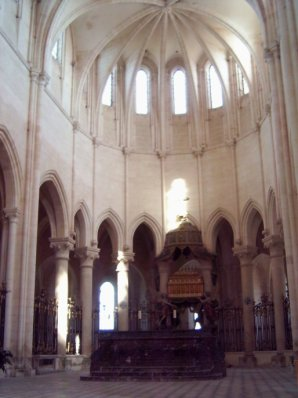
Choir of the abbey church

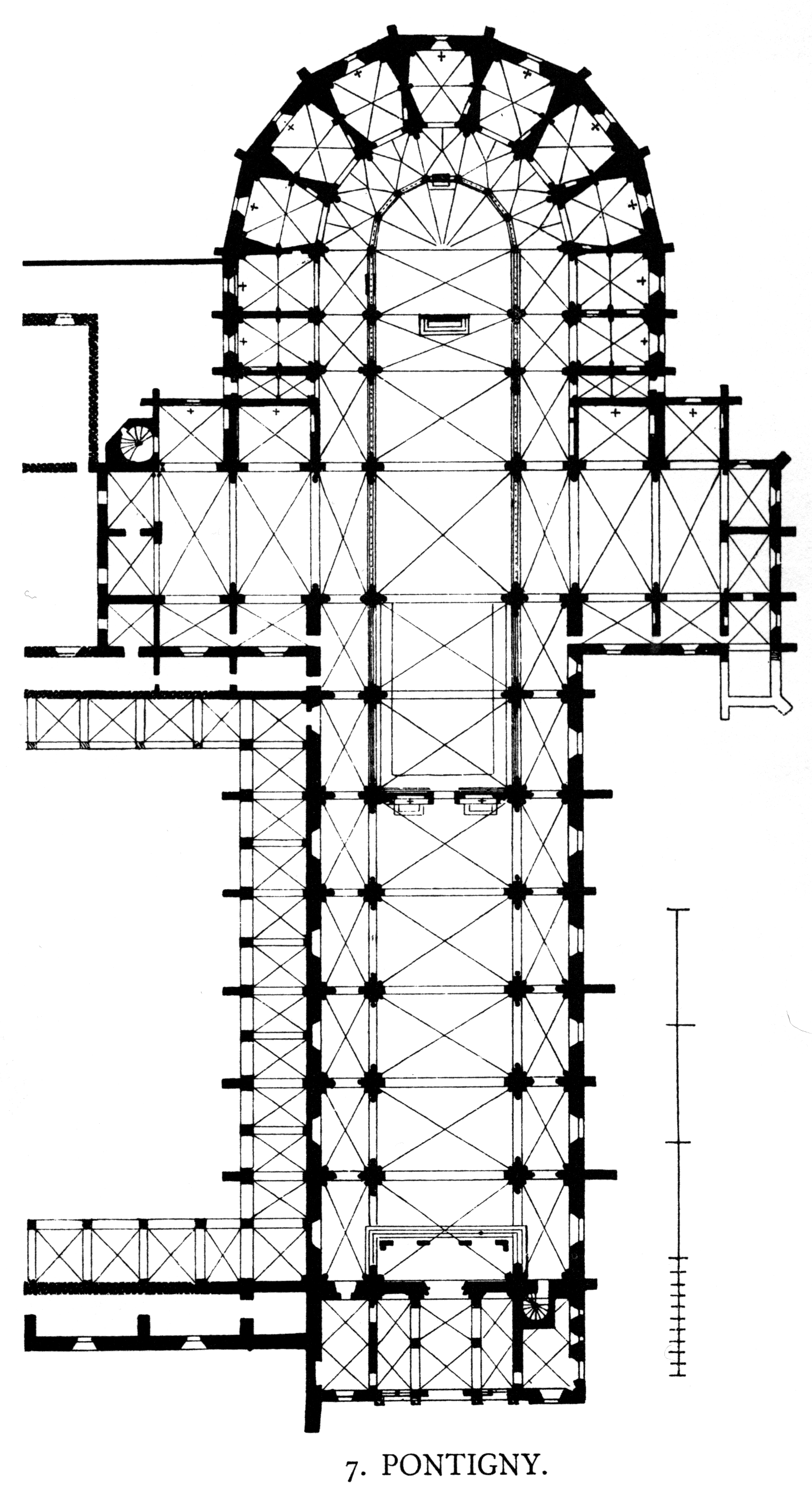
Ground plan of the abbey church

Pontigny Abbey (French: Abbaye de Pontigny), the church of which in recent decades has also been the cathedral of the Mission de France, otherwise the Territorial Prelature of Pontigny (French: Cathédrale-abbatiale de Notre-Dame-de-l’Assomption à Pontigny), was a Cistercian monastery located in Pontigny on the River Serein, in the present diocese of Sens and department of Yonne, Burgundy, France. Founded in 1114, it was the second of the four great daughter houses of Cîteaux Abbey. It was suppressed in 1791 in the French Revolution and destroyed except for the church. In 1843 it was re-founded as a community of the Fathers of St. Edmund. In 1909 it passed into private ownership. In 1941 it became the mother house of the Mission de France, a territorial prelature.

== History ==
Hildebert (or Ansius), a canon of Auxerre, petitioned abbot Stephen Harding of Cîteaux to found a monastery in a place he had selected for this purpose. Accordingly, in 1114 Stephen sent twelve monks under the guidance of Hugh of Mâcon, the first abbot and a friend and kinsman of Bernard of Clairvaux, to establish the new foundation. Under Abbot Hugh and his successor, Guichard, the new monastery developed such a reputation for sanctity that it attracted sufficient numbers to be able to establish another twenty-two Cistercian monasteries.

In the 12th century, Pontigny was situated in the County of Auxerre, at that time not a part of the Duchy of Burgundy and, though exempt, in the Diocese of Auxerre, a suffragan of the Archbishopric of Sens, which also comprised the Diocese of Paris. The distance from Sens is 44 km (27 miles). It was sponsored by Louis VI of France (and Theobald II, Count of Champagne). This way connected to the crown lands around Paris, it participated in the inception of Gothic style, already in the first phase of construction (probably since 1138) of its abbey church.

Many members of the community of Pontigny went on to occupy high positions in the church and many distinguished personages sought refuge there. Amongst the former were, Blessed Hugh of Mâcon, Bishop of Auxerre (d. 1151); Girard Mainard, Cardinal Bishop of Praeneste (d. 1202); and Robert, Cardinal Titular of St. Pudentiana (d. 1294). The latter included three Archbishops of Canterbury: Saint Thomas Becket, and Stephen Langton. Saint Edmund of Abingdon was taken ill here on his way back from Rome, died at the house of Augustinian Canons at Soisy-Bouy and his body was brought back to the Abbey for burial.

Over the centuries, however, the original strict discipline relaxed, especially from 1456, when the abbey was given in commendam. In 1569 it was pillaged and burnt by the Huguenots, only the relics of Saint Edmund being saved. Partly restored, it continued in existence until it was suppressed during the French Revolution. The monastic buildings were largely destroyed, but the church was saved, due to the respect in which the cult of Saint Edmund was still held, and continued in use after the Revolution as a parish church.

In 1843 a community of the Fathers of St. Edmund was established here by J. B. Muard.

In 1909 the remaining southern wing (refectory and dormitories of the lay brothers) was bought by the philosopher Paul Desjardins, who from 1910 to 1914 held meetings every year at the abbey, known as "Decades of Pontigny", or conferences of ten days' duration, where the intellectual élite of Europe met including inter alia Jean-Paul Sartre, Simone de Beauvoir, T. S. Eliot, Thomas Mann, Heinrich Mann, Nikolai Berdyaev. Between 1922 and 1939, after the end of World War I, Desjardins reorganized the conferences to evaluate the future of Europe, annually bringing together such notables as Charles du Bos, Roger Martin du Gard, André Gide, Paul Langevin, André Malraux, François Mauriac, Jacques Rivière and Alice Voinescu, among others.

It later housed a college, then from 1954 the Mission de France seminary. In 2003, it was bought by the Regional Council of Burgundy.

== Burials ==
Among the burials in the abbey church are the following:

- Adèle of Champagne (1145–1206), queen of Louis VII of France
- Saint Edmund of Abingdon (c. 1180–1240), Archbishop of Canterbury
- Paul Desjardins (1859–1940)

== Viticulture ==
Next to their religious duties the monks of Pontigny were also much occupied in the cultivation of vineyards. They established the original vineyard from which the present Chablis wine traces its descent.

== Pilgrims' Route ==
The abbey is a stopping-point on one of the pilgrimage routes to Santiago de Compostela.
