= Tiglieto Abbey =

Coordinates: 44°31′20″N 08°36′13″E

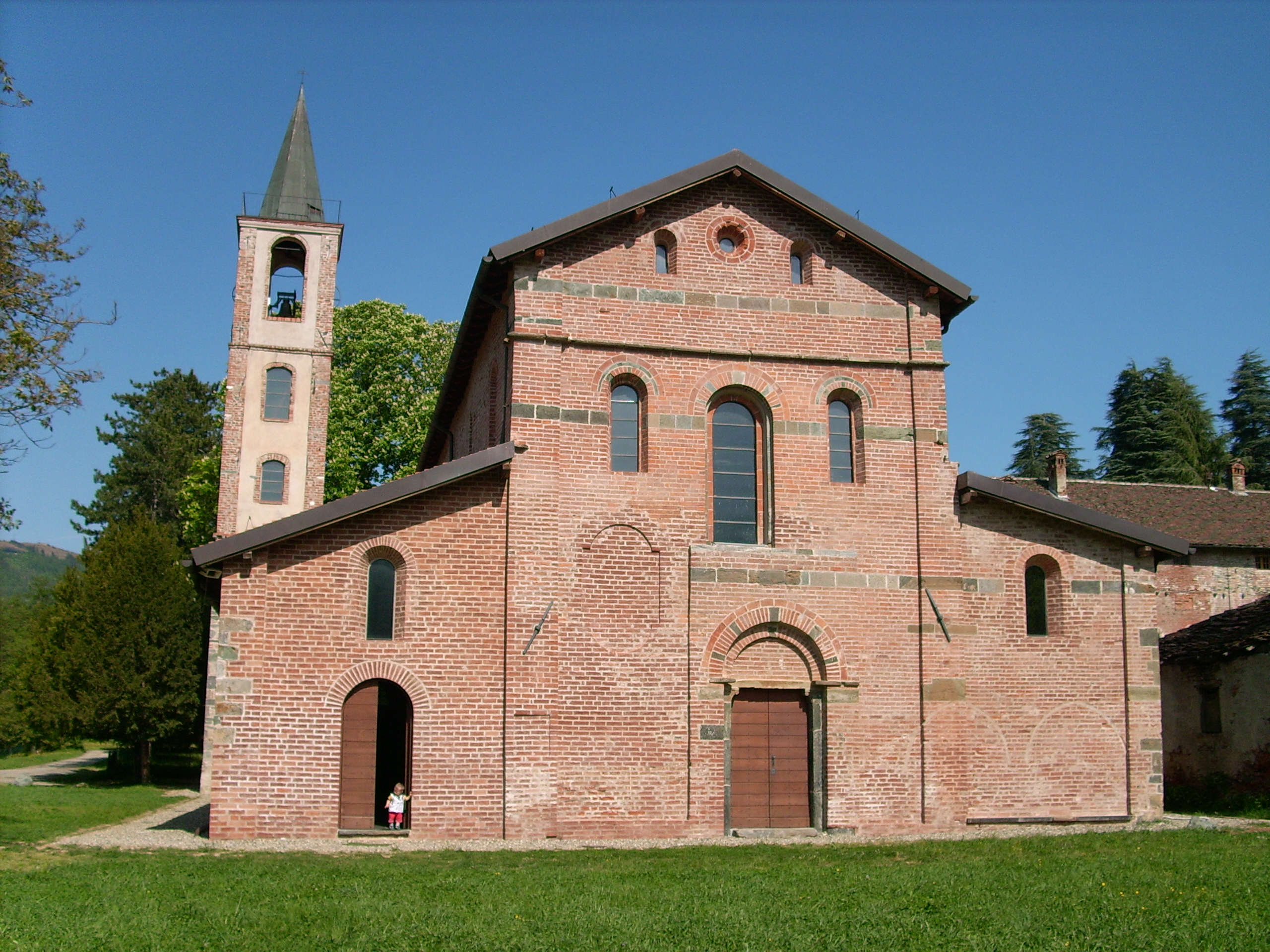
Tiglieto Abbey church.

Tiglieto Abbey (Badia di Tiglieto, also known as Santa Maria alla Croce de Civitacula) is a monastery in Tiglieto, Liguria, northern Italy. It was the first Cistercian abbey to be founded in Italy, and also the first outside France.

The abbey is located on the left bank of the brook known as the Orba, 382 metres above sea level in the Province of Genoa, near the border of the Region of Piedmont.

== History ==
The abbey, founded in 1120 at the instigation of Peter I of Tarentaise, was a daughter house of La Ferté Abbey. The first abbot was probably Opizzone. It may have gained the name Tiglieto (Latin: Teletum) after being given the estate of that name by the Margrave Anselm of Ponsone in 1131.

Communities from Tiglieto settled Staffarda Abbey and Casanova Abbey as its daughter houses, both in the present Region of Piedmont.

In 1205, Gerardo da Sesso was elected abbot. He became a cardinal in 1211.

In 1442, through Pope Eugenius IV, Tiglieto became an abbey in commendam. In 1648 it was turned into a family estate of the last commendatory abbot, Cardinal Raggio, and dissolved. In 1747 the area was occupied by the Austrians, who shortly afterwards were driven out by the Genoese.

In 2000 Tiglieto was reoccupied by the Cistercians.

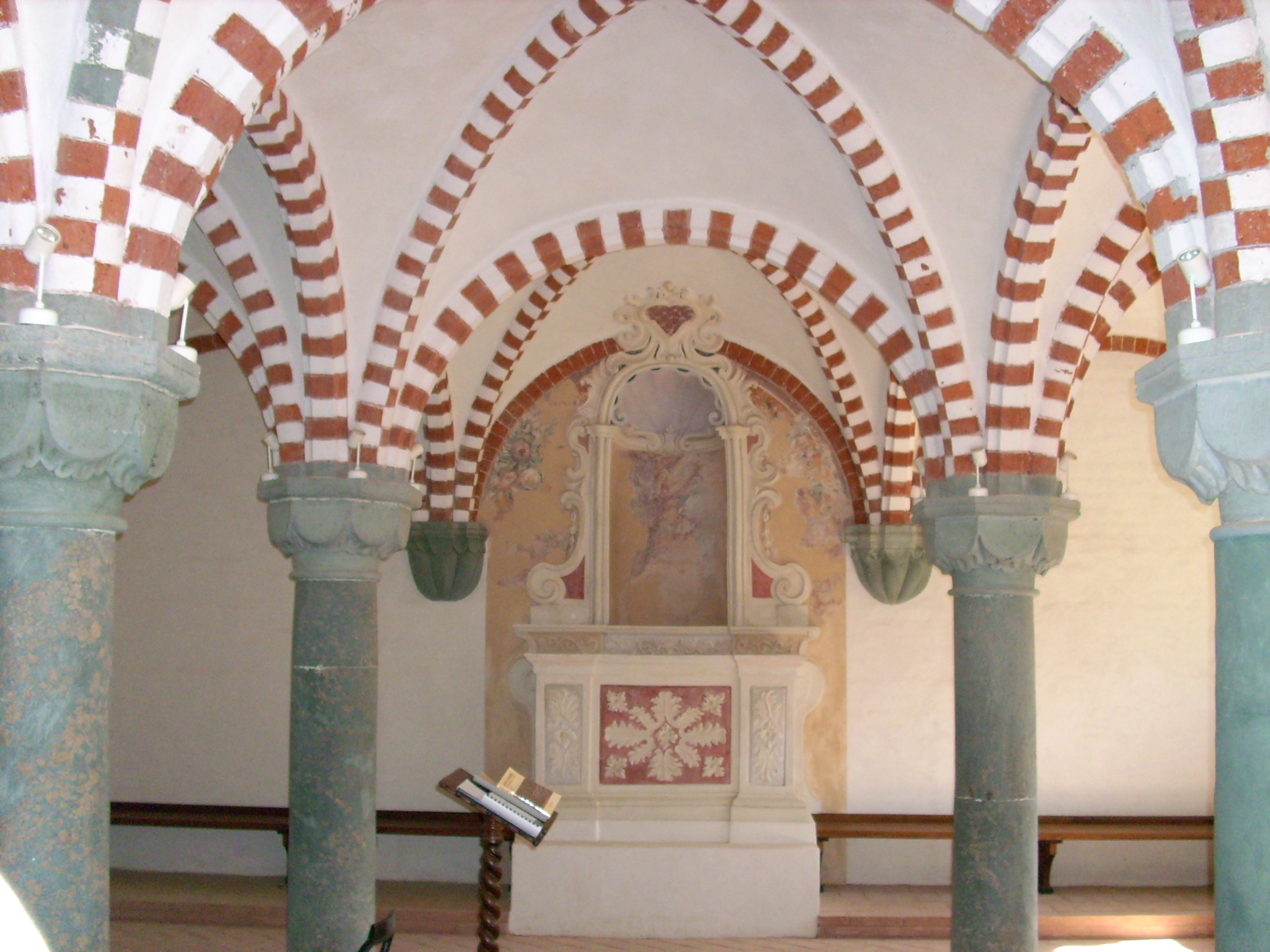
Chapterhouse.

== Buildings and precinct ==
The church is a primitive Romanesque brick basilica; the original side-chapels were removed in the 14th century to make way for a new east end. The nave was vaulted in the Baroque period, and a new choir at the west end was added at the same time, as was a Baroque campanile. The conventual buildings are to the south of the church. The early Gothic chapter house in the east range has survived, with a square chapter room with nine bays from the early 13th century and symmetrical triforium windows looking onto the central courtyard and the site of the cloister, no longer extant, with the dormitory with bricked-up windows in the upper storey, as have the sacristy, the Fraternei and to the south the refectory building, as well as the lay brothers' block in the west, now converted for residential purposes. The entire precinct was renovated for the new community that took over the premises in 2000.

== Sources ==
- Bedini. B.G., 1964: Breve prospetto delle abazie cisterciensi d’Italia (pp. 9–10). Casamari. [ISBN unspecified] (in Italian)
- Schomann, H., 1982: Reclams Kunstführer Italien I.2 (p. 411), Stuttgart: Philipp Reclam jun. ISBN 3-15-010305-3
