= Chronological list of saints and blesseds in the 12th century =

A list of people, who died during the 12th century, who have received recognition as Blessed (through beatification) or Saint (through canonization) from the Catholic Church:

Name	Birth	Birthplace	Death	Place of death	Notes
Bruno	1032	Cologne, Germany	1101	Squillace, Italy	
Peter of Anagni		Salerno, Italy	1105		Bishop of Anagni
Aurelian	1010		1106		Bishop of Hanover
Benno	1010	Hildesheim, Germany	1106	Meissen, Saxony	Bishop of Meissen
John of Lodi		Lodi Vecchio, Italy	1106	Gubbio, Italy	Bishop of Gubbio
Nicetas		Kiev, Ukraine	1107	Novgorod, Russia	Bishop of Novgorod
Blessed Benedict of Coltiboni			1107		
Alberic			1109	Cîteaux, France	
Anselm	1033	Aosta, Kingdom of Burgundy	1109	Canterbury, Kent	Archbishop of Canterbury
Bernard of Capua		Capua, Italy	1109	Carinola, Campania, Italy	Bishop of Carinola
Dominic de la Calzada	1019	Viloria de Rioja, Spain	1109	Santo Domingo de la Calzada, Spain	
Gerald		Cahors, Gascony	1109	Bornos, then in Portugal	Bishop of Braga
Hugh of Cluny	1024	Semur, Brionnais, France	1109	Cluny, France	
Peter of Burgo			1109		Bishop of Osma
Blessed Edigna			1109		
Berthold		Parma, Italy	1111	Parma, Italy	
Robert of Molesme	1027	Troyes, Champagne, France	1111	Molesme, France	
Benedict of Cagliari			1112	Dolia, Sardinia	Bishop of Dolia
Blessed Odo of Cambrai	1050		1113		Bishop of Cambrai
Godfrey of Amiens (Geoffrey)	1066	Soissons, France	1115	Soissons, France	Bishop of Amiens
Ivo of Chartres	1040	Beauvais, France	1115		Bishop of Chartres
Blessed Humbald			1115		Bishop of Auxerre
Blessed Peter the Hermit	1050		1115		
Blessed Peter			1115		Bishop of Poitiers
Lidanus	1026	Antinum, Italy	1118	Monte Cassino, Italy	
Raymond of Toulouse (Raymond Gayrard)		Toulouse, France	1118	Toulouse, France	
Erminold		Germany	1121	Regensburg, Germany	
Frederick			1121	Liège, Belgium	Bishop of Liège
Ogmund	1052		1121		Bishop of Hólar
Bernard Valeara			1122	Teramo, Italy	Bishop of Teramo
Egino		Augsburg, Bavaria, Germany	1122	Pisa, Italy	
Odo of Urgell		Barcelona, Spain	1122		Bishop of Urgell
Blessed Vitalis of Savigny	1063		1122		
Bertrand of Comminges	1050	L'Isle-Jourdain, France	1123	Lugdunum Convenarum, France	Bishop of Comminges
Bruno of Segni	1047	Solero in Lombardy	1123	Segni, Italy	Bishop of Segni
Peter of Pappacarbone		Salerno, Italy	1123		Bishop of Policastro
Gerald	1070	Puissalicon, France	1123	Béziers, France	Bishop of Béziers
Caradoc			1124	Haroldston, Wales	
Constabilis	1060	Tresino, Lucania, modern Italy	1124	Cava de' Tirreni, Campania, Italy	
Stephen of Muret (or Grandmont)	1046	Thiers, France	1124		
Adelina			1125		
Bonfilius	1040		1125	Osimo, Italy	Bishop of Foligno
Blessed Adeline			1125		
Blessed Lambert			1125		
Raymond of Barbastro		Durban, France	1126	Barbastro, Aragon, Spain	Bishop of Barbastro
Blessed Conrad of Seldenburen			1126		
Albert		Normandy	1127	Motta Montecorvino, Apulia, Italy	Bishop of Montecorvino
Henry of Coquet			1127	Coquet Island, England	
Blessed Charles the Good	1083		1127		
Blessed Godfrey of Kappenberg	1097		1127		
Blessed Gualfardus (Wolfhard)	1070		1127		
Cellach (Ceilach, Keilach)	1080	Ireland	1129	Munster, Ireland	Archbishop of Armagh
John Theristus ("Harvester")	1049	Sicily, Italy	1129	Calabria, Italy	
Elizabeth Rose			1130	Courtenay, Loiret, France	
Isidore the Farmer	1070	Madrid, Kingdom of Castile	1130	Madrid, Kingdom of Castile	
William Breteuil			1130	Breteuil, near Beauvais, France	
Blessed Diemoda (Diemut)	1060		1130		
Blessed John of Therouanne			1130		
Adjutor		Vernon, France	1131	Tiron, France	
Canute	1096	Roskilde, Denmark	1131	Haraldsted near Ringsted in Zeeland, Denmark	Martyr
Hugh of Châteauneuf	1053	Châteauneuf-sur-Isère, France	1132	Grenoble, France	Bishop of Grenoble
Bernard			1133	Parma, Italy	Bishop of Parma
Allucio	1070	Valdinievole, Italy	1134	Valdinievole, Italy	
Landulf of Yariglia			1134	Asti, Italy	Bishop of Asti
Norbert	1080	Xanten, Electorate of Cologne, Holy Roman Empire	1134	Magdeburg, Archbishopric of Magdeburg	Bishop of Magdeburg
Stephen Harding	1059	Dorset, England	1134		
Belina			1135	Troyes, France	Virgin and Martyr
Blessed Humbeline	1092		1135		
Leopold of Austria	1073	Melk, Austria	1136	Niederosterrich, Austria	
Peter of Juilly		England	1136		
Blessed Jutta of Diessenberg	1091		1136		
Adela	1067	Normandy, France	1137	Marcigny-sur-Loire, France	Daughter of William the Conqueror
Grimoaldus			1137		
Ollegarius (Oldegar)	1060	Barcelona, Spain	1137	Tarragona, Spain	Archbishop of Tarragona
Christian		Armagh, Northern Ireland	1138	Clogher, Northern Ireland	Bishop of Clogher
Blessed Gerard of Clairvaux	1090		1138		
Blessed Waltman			1138		
John of Pulsano (John of Matera)	1070	Matera, Italy	1139	Pulsano, Italy	
Otto	1060	Mistelbach, Franconia	1139	Pomerania, Poland	Bishop of Bamberg
Aybert (Aibert)	1060	Espain, Belgium	1140	Tournai, Belgium	
Baldwin			1140	Rieti, Italy	
Gaucherius	1060	Meulan-sur-Seine, France	1140		
Blessed Stilla			1140		
William of Vercelli	1085	Vercelli, Italy	1142	Sant'Angelo dei Lombardi, Italy	
John de Urteca (John the Hermit)	1050	Burgos, Spain	1143		
William of Norwich	1132	Norwich	1144	Norwich	blood libel - cult suppressed
Blessed Ayrald (Airald)			1146		Bishop of Maurienne
Malachy O'More	1094	Armagh, Northern Ireland	1148	Clairvaux, France	Archbishop of Armagh
Guarinus (Guerin)	1065	Pont-à-Mousson, France	1150	Aulps Abbey, France	Bishop of Sion
Blessed Theobald (Theobald Roggeris)		Vico, Italy	1150		
Bellinus			1151	Padua, Italy	Bishop of Padua
Blessed Raynald de Bar			1151		
Adelelmus		Flanders, Belgium	1152		
Chelidonia		Ciculum, Abruzzi, Italy	1152	Subiaco, Italy	
Thethmar (Theodemar)			1152		
Blessed Ralph			1152		
Blessed Redigund (Wedigund)			1152		
Atto	1070	Badajoz, Spain	1153	Italy	Bishop of Pistoia
Bernard of Clairvaux	1090	Fontaine-lès-Dijon, France	1153	Clairvaux, France	Doctor of the Church
David I	1084		1153	Carlisle, Scotland	King of Scotland
Blessed Eugenius III	1100		1153		pope
Lambert	1084	Bauduen, France	1154	Vence, France	Bishop of Vence
Stephen of Obazine	1085	Limousin, France	1154	Obazine, France	
Vicelin	1086	Hemeln, Lower Saxony, Germany	1154	Neumünster, Lorraine, France	Bishop of Oldenburg
William		York, England	1154	York, England	Archbishop of York
Wulfric	1080	Compton Martin, Bristol, England	1154	Haselbury Plucknett, Somerset, England	
Blessed Conrad of Bavaria	1105		1154		
Blessed Ulric			1154		
Bernard of Valdeiglesias			1155		
Florentius of Carracedo			1156		
Henry		England	1156	Köyliö, Finland	Bishop of Uppsala
Blessed Peter the Venerable (Peter of Montboissier)	1092		1156		
William of Maleval		France	1157	Castiglione della Pescaia, Italy	
Blessed Robert Bruges			1157		
Guarinus (Warin)	1080	Bologna, Italy	1158	Pavia, Italy	Bishop of Palestrina
Ronald	1100	Norway	1158	Caithness, Scotland	Earl of Orkney
Blessed Serlon			1158		
John of Meda		Meda, Milan, Italy	1159	Brera, Italy	
Robert of Newminster	1100	Gargrave, North Yorkshire, England	1159	Newminster Abbey, Morpeth, Northumberland, England	
Blessed Amadeus of Lausanne	1110		1159		
Arnulf	1095		1160	St. Jakob, Regensburg, Germany	Archbishop of Mainz
Cosmas		Palermo, Sicily, Italy	1160	Sicily, Italy	Bishop of Aphrodisia
Mechtildis of Edelstetten		Bavaria, Germany	1160	Diessen, Bavaria, Germany	
Rainerius of Pisa	1117	Pisa, Italy	1160	Pisa, Italy	
Ubald Baldassini (Ubaldus)	1086	Gubbio, Italy	1160	Gubbio, Italy	Bishop of Gubbio
Blessed John the Spaniard	1123		1160		
Blessed Roger of Ellant			1160		
Blessed Waltheof of Walthen			1160		
Eric of Sweden	1120	Sweden	1161	Uppsala, Sweden	Martyred King of Sweden
Blessed Leo of Saint-Bertin			1163		
Blessed Raymund of Fitero (Raymond, Ramon Sierra)			1163		
Eberhard		Nuremberg, Germany	1164	Rein Abbey, Gratwein, Styria, Austria	Archbishop of Salzburg
Elizabeth of Schonau	1129	Germany	1164	Bonn, Germany	
Blessed Hartman			1164		Bishop of Brixen
Blessed Hugh of Fosses	1093		1164		
Adalgott			1165		Bishop of Chur
Goswin of Anchin	1086	Douai, France	1165	Pecquencourt, France	
Rosalia	1130	Palermo, Sicily	1166	Mount Pellegrino, Sicily	Virgin
Theotonius	1082	Ganfei, Valença, Portugal	1162	Coimbra, Portugal	
Harold		England	1168	Gloucester, England	Martyr
John of the Grating	1098	Brittany, France	1168		Bishop of Aleth
Richard of Vaucelles		England	1169	Cambrai, France	
Gerlac	1100	Houthem, the Netherlands	1170	Houthem, the Netherlands	
Godric of Finchale	1065	Walpole, Norfolk, England	1170	Finchale, County Durham, England	
Hugh of Noara		France	1170	Novara, Sicily	
Thomas Becket	1118	Cheapside, London, England	1170	Canterbury, Kent, England	Archbishop of Canterbury
Wivina	1103	Oisy, France	1170	Groot-Bijgaarden, near Brussels, Belgium	
Blessed Marinus			1170		
Aimo		Rennes, France	1173		
Peter	1102	Saint-Maurice-l'Exil, France	1174	Bellevaux Abbey, France	Archbishop of Tarentaise
CorneliusConor/Connor (Cornelius Mac Conchailleadh or McConchailleach)		Ireland	1176	Chambéry, Savoy, France	Archbishop of Armagh
Galdinus	1096	Milan, Italy	1176	Milan, Italy	Archbishop of Milan
Anthelm	1107	Chambéry, Savoy, France	1178	Belley, France	Bishop of Belley
Blessed Emilina	1115		1178		
Hildegard of Bingen	1098	Bermersheim vor der Höhe, Germany	1179	Bingen am Rhein, Germany	
Aventinus			1180	Touraine, France	
Bernard de Alzira			1180		
Herbert Hoscam		England	1180	Conza, Italy	Archbishop of Conza
Lawrence O'Toole	1125	Castledermot, Kildare, Ireland	1180	Eu, Normandy, France	Archbishop of Dublin
Raynerius of Split (Renier of Split)			1180	Split, Croatia	Archbishop of Split
Blesseds Nicholas and Anne Giustiniani			1180		
Galgano Guidotti	1148	Chiusdino, Siena, Italy	1181	Monte Siepe, Tuscany, Italy	
Blessed Albert of Clatina			1181		
Blessed Eskil of Lund	1100		1181		
Blessed John Sordi			1181		
Bogumilus (Bogimilus, Theophilus)	1135	Dobrow, Poland	1182	Uniedow, Poland	Archbishop of Gniezno
Blessed Bernard the Penitent			1182		
Hildegund		Germany	1183		
Blessed John Cacciafronte			1183		Bishop of Mantua
Benedict Benezet	1163	Hermillon, Savoy, France	1184		
Silvester of Troina		Italy	1185		
Drogo (Droun)	1105		1186	Sebourg, France	
Blessed Christian O'Conarcy, Giolla Criost Ua Condoirche			1186		
Eysteinn Erlendsson			1188	Nidaros, Norway	Archbishop of Nidaros
Blessed Humbert III	1136		1188		
Gilbert of Sempringham	1083	Sempringham, Lincolnshire, England	1189	Sempringham, Lincolnshire, England	
Maurice of Carnoet	1117	Kerbarth, Croixanvec, France	1191		
Albert of Louvain	1166	Brabant, Belgium	1192	Rheims, France	Bishop of Liège
William of Pontoise			1192	Pontoise, France	
Barlaam of Khutyn		Novgorod, Russia	1193	Khutyn, Veliky Novgorod, Russia	
Bartholomew of Farne (Tostig)		Whitby, Northumbria, England	1193	Farne Islands, England	
Thorlak Thorharlsson	1133	Fljótshlíð, Iceland	1193	Skálholt, Iceland	Bishop of Skalholt
Blessed Desiderius (Didier)			1194		Bishop of Thérouanne
Ascelina	1121		1195		
Berthold		Limoges, France	1195		
Richard		England	1196	Andria, Italy	Bishop of Andria
Homobonus		Cremona, Lombardy, Italy	1197	Cremona, Lombardy, Italy	
Blessed William Tempier			1197		Bishop of Poitiers
Donatus	1179	Ripacandida, Italy	1198		
Hatebrand		Frisia, Netherlands	1198	Frisia, Netherlands	
Peter Pareuzi		Rome, Italy	1199	Orvieto, Italy	Martyr
Conus		Diano, Italy	1200	Cardossa, Lucania, Italy	
Hugh of Avalon	1140	Avalon, Burgundy, France	1200	London, England	Bishop of Lincoln
Blessed Odo of Novara	1105		1200		
Raymond the Palmer	1140	Piacenza	1200	Piacenza	

== See also ==
- Christianity in the 12th century
