= Houthem =

Houthem can be:

- Houthem, Wallonia, a district of the municipality of Comines-Warneton, Belgium
- Houthem, Netherlands, a village in the Netherlands
- Houtem, West Flanders (on the 1770s Ferraris maps spelled Houthem)
