= Cassan Priory =

Abbey in Hérault, France

Coordinates: 43°30′35″N 3°17′17″E

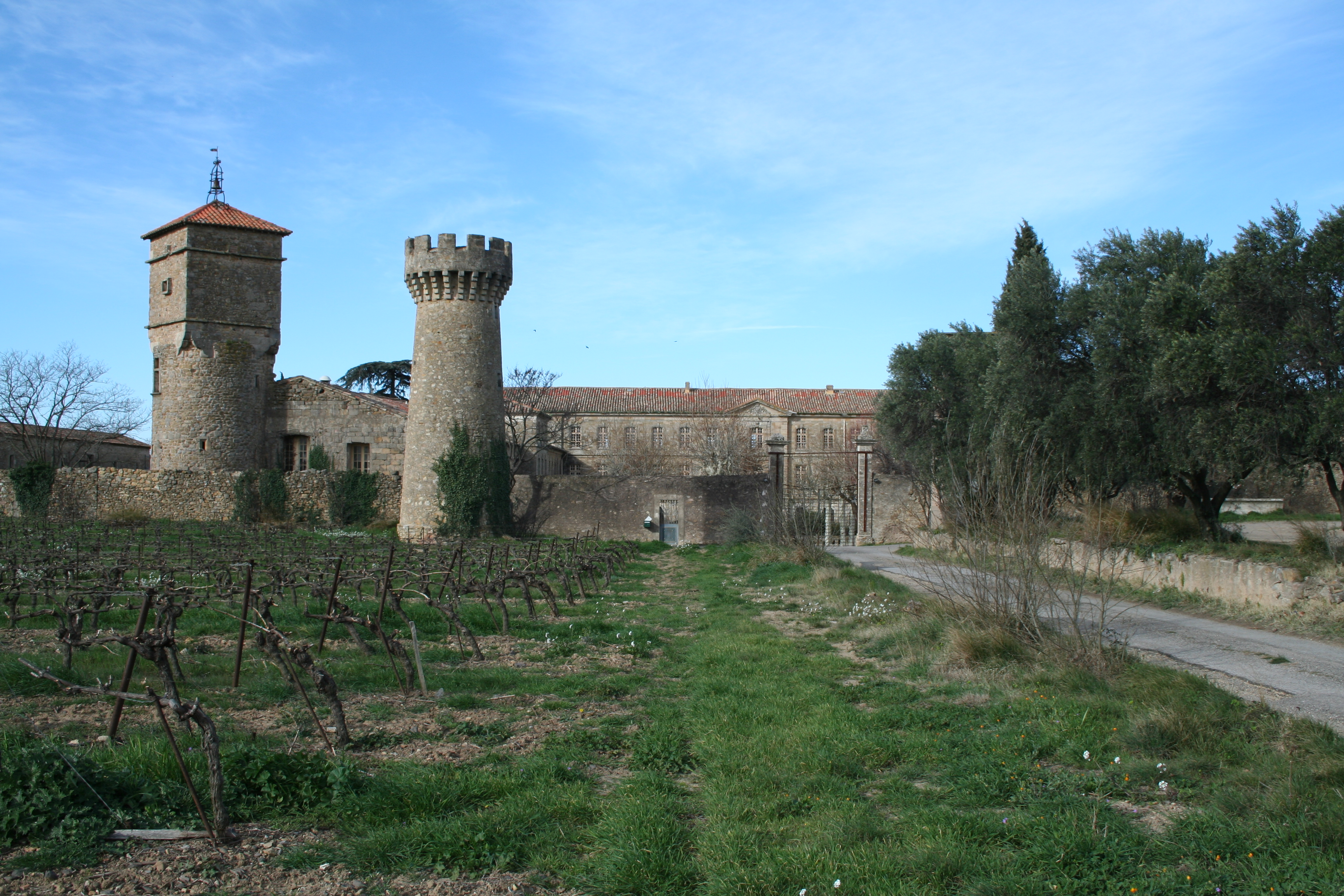

Cassan Priory (French: Prieuré de Cassan, also Abbaye de Cassan; French: château de Cassan) is an 18th-century building in France, classed as a historical monument. It is located in Roujan commune, Hérault département, Occitanie.

== History ==
The Augustinian priory was founded in 1080, on land donated by the noble Alquier family of Béziers A new church was consecrated on 6 October 1115. The second prior was Saint Guiraud (d. 1123). Numerous relics were collected by the priory and it served as a burial ground to the nobility of the region. The lands owned by the priory extended to 75 villages.

Pope Innocent III in the context of the crusade against the Cathars exempted the priory from control by the bishops of Béziers, making it subject only to the Holy See in spiritual matters. In secular terms, the monastery pledged allegiance to Louis IX of France in 1268.

In the 14th century the priory began to decline, as a result of the Black Death and the turmoils of the Hundred Years' War, and the number of canons halved, from 80 in the 13th century to 40 by 1384. The monastery was pillaged during the wars of religion, in 1539, and again in 1563.

By 1605, the monastic community was moribund, reduced to seven or eight canons. In 1671, it was attached to the Abbey of St Genevieve in Paris. The medieval buildings were torn down and the premises were rebuilt from scratch in the mid-18th century under the commendatory prior Pas de Beaulieu, except for the church building, which was modified but retains its 12th-century Romanesque core structure. After the French Revolution, the monastery was dissolved and the property nationalised. In 1791 it was sold to an advocate, Marc Antoine Thomas Mérigeaux, who bought it on behalf of the Prince de Conti who offered it to his mistress, Madame de Brimont. From this point, the former monastery became known as the Château de Cassan (Cassan Castle).

It changed hands several times during the 19th and 20th centuries, eventually passing to the French state, housing administrative offices, but in 1995 was sold again to a private party, and in 2002 to a real estate holding company. The priory church and the western wing of the castle were classed as a national historical monument in 1953. Other parts of the estate were so classed in 1998.
