= Saint Gerlach =

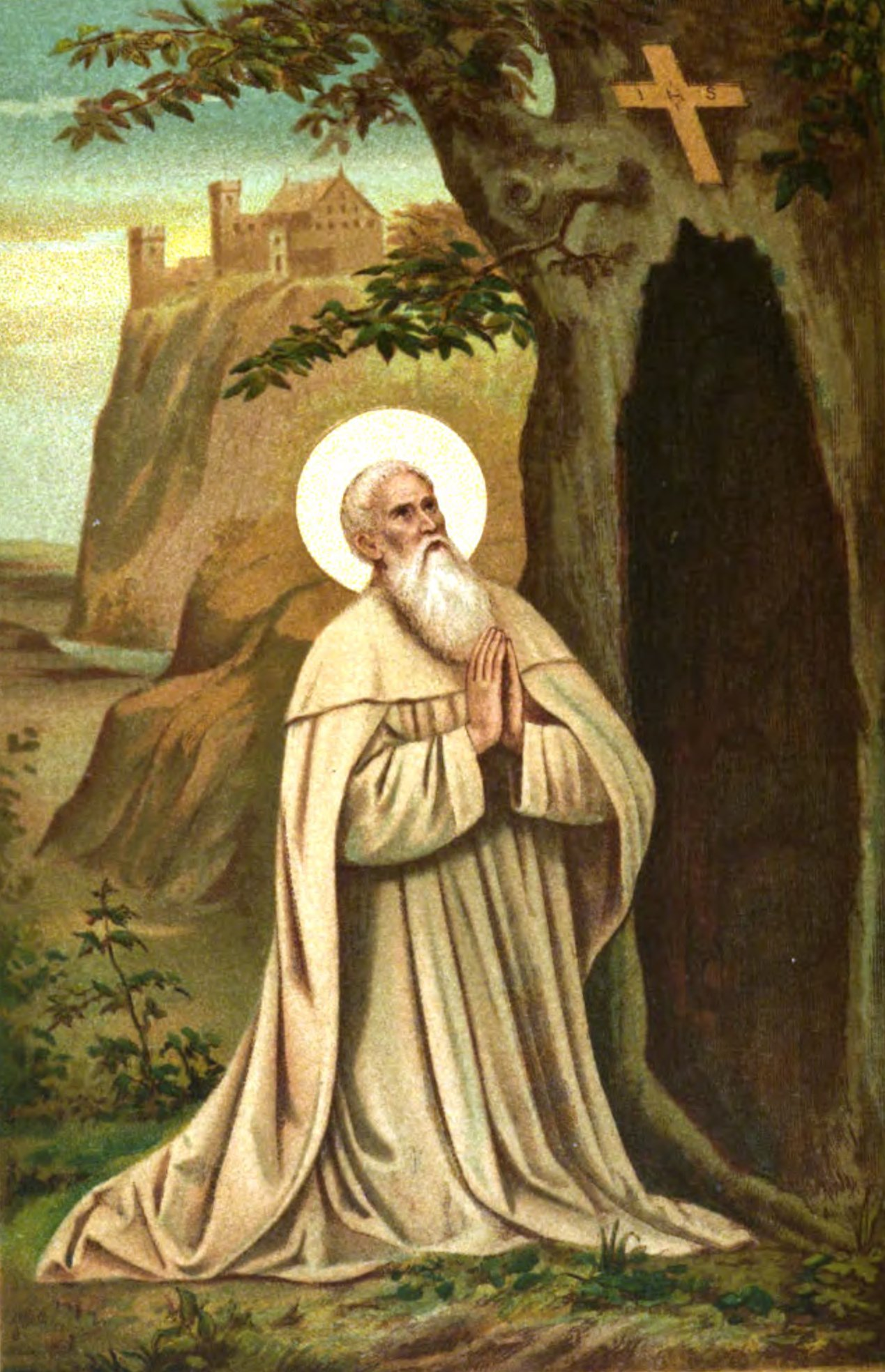
- Born: c. 1100; Houthem, Netherlands
- Died: c. 1170; Houthem, Netherlands
- Venerated in: Roman Catholic Church
- Feast: 5 January
- Attributes: garments of a hermit, praying near his hermitage in a tree, with a donkey near him, thorn in his foot

Gerlach (Gerlache, Gerlac, Gerlachus van Houthem, Gerlac of Valkenberg) (d. c. 1170) was a 12th-century Dutch hermit. His cult is centered at Houthem near Valkenburg in the south of the province of Limburg.

== Life ==
The Vita Beati Gerlaci Eremytae, written around 1227, describes his legend and life. Originally a licentious soldier and brigand, Gerlache became a pious Christian upon the death of his wife and went on pilgrimage to Rome and Jerusalem. At Rome, he nursed the sick for seven years. He also performed rites of penance for the sins of his youth.

Upon returning to the Netherlands, he gave up all of his possessions to the poor and took up residence in a hollow oak on his former estate near Houthem. He ate bread mixed with ash and traveled by foot each day on pilgrimage to Maastricht, to the Basilica of Saint Servatius.

He was engaged in a dispute with local monks, who wanted him to enter their monastery. The common people in the area considered him a saint, but the monks appealed to the local bishop. They accused Gerlach of actually being incredibly rich, his oak actually being the location of a cache of treasure. The bishop commanded that Gerlach's oak be cut down. Gerlach, however, had by this time made powerful friends, including Hildegard of Bingen, and received protection. Nevertheless, his oak was cut down, but the bishop found no treasure and wanted to make up his mistake to Gerlach by having the oak cut up in planks and having a small hut constructed with those.

Legend states that when Gerlach had done enough penance, water from the local well transformed itself into wine three times as a sign that his sins had been forgiven. He died shortly after, barely fifty and legend has it that the last rites were administered to him by the Servatius of Tongeren himself.

== The name ==
Gerlach is a male forename of Germanic origin, variations of which exist in many Germanic and Romance languages. Like many other early Germanic names, it is dithematic, consisting of two meaningful constituents put together. In this case, those constituents are ger (meaning 'spear') and /la:k / (meaning 'motion'). The meaning of the name is thus 'spear thrower'.

== Veneration ==
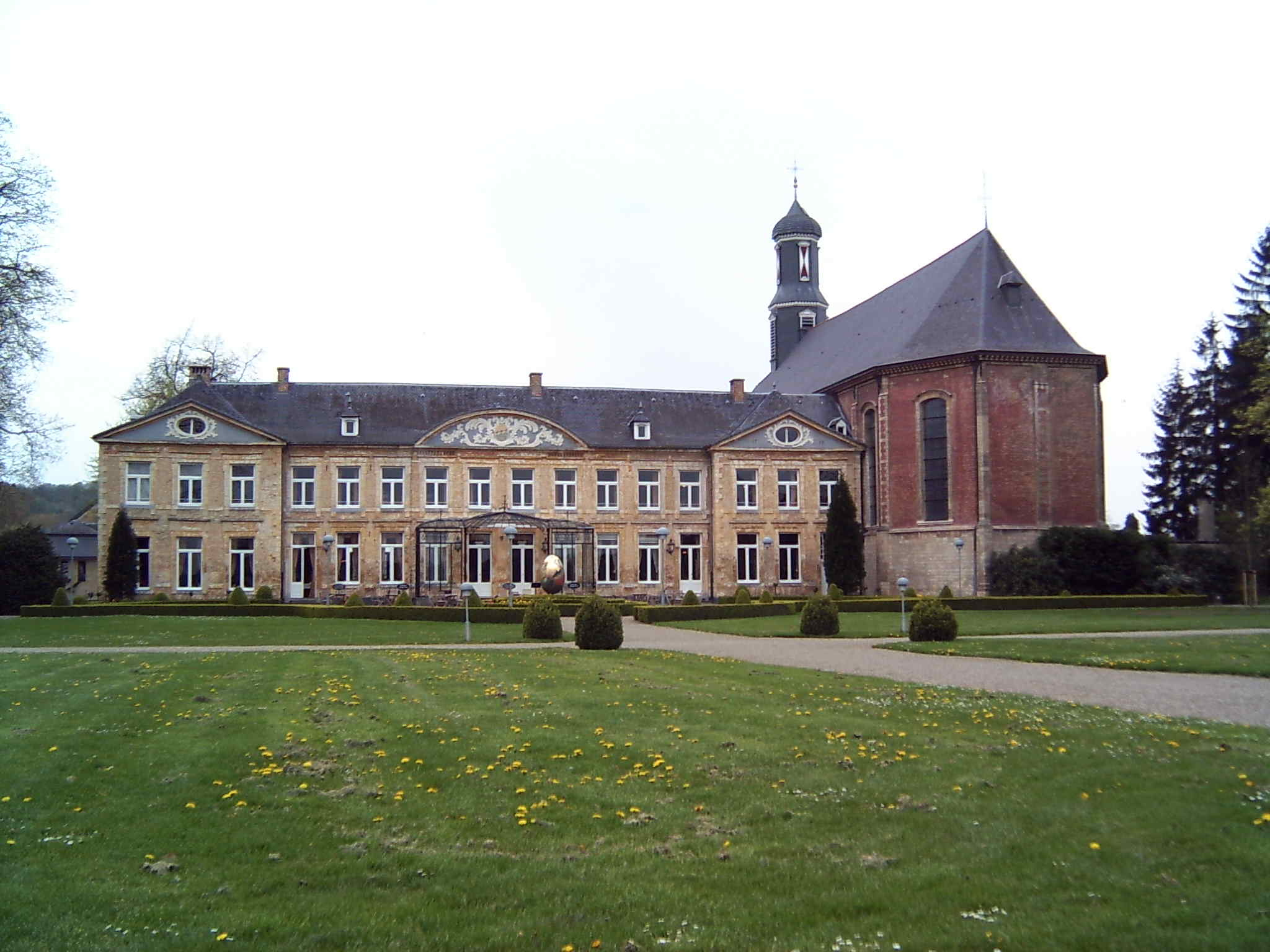
Church and château in Houthem

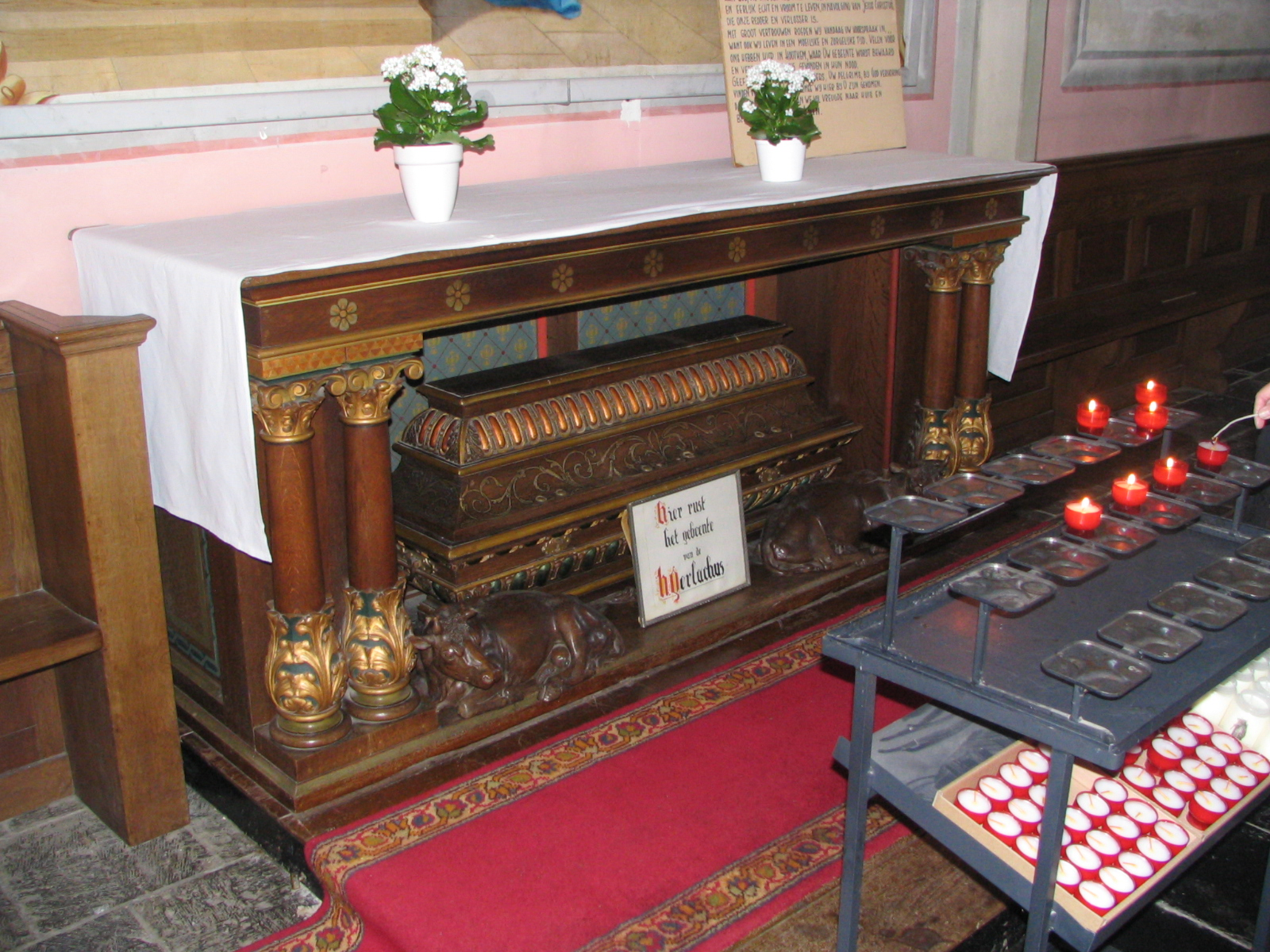
The reliquary of Saint Gerlach

Gerlach's grave became a site of pilgrimage. In 1201 a Premonstratensian monastery was established on the site of Gerlach's small chapel. The order venerates Gerlach of Valkenburg as a Blessed, with a feast day of 5 January. In 1225 the small abbey became a convent for noblewomen. The area suffered greatly during the Eighty Years' War.

The abbey church was rebuilt in 1721 as a new parish church for the village of Houthem. The monastery later became a hotel, the Château St. Gerlach. Sint-Gerlachuskerk is a pilgrim church on the Camino de Santiago. It contains a museum and a silver reliquary housing Gerlach's skull. On the occasion of the 850th anniversary of the parish, a bust of Gerlach was reconstructed based on the skull. Contributors to the project included Charlie Watts and Ron Wood of The Rolling Stones who had a guided tour of the church and museum while staying at the Chateau during a concert in Landgraaf in June 2014.

== Sources ==
- Houthem-St. Gerlach (L): St. Gerlachus
- Bosworth-Toller Anglo-Saxon Dictionary: lác
