= Peter of Juilly =

French Roman Catholic saint

Saint Peter of Juilly
- Born: England
- Died: 1136
- Venerated in: Roman Catholic Church
- Feast: 23 June

Peter of Juilly (died 1136) was a Benedictine monk and renowned preacher.

Born in England, he joined Molesme Abbey, a Benedictine monastery at Molesme in Burgundy. There he became acquainted with Saint Stephen Harding.

He was later the confessor for the nuns of the Priory of Jully-les-Nonnains, under the then abbess Blessed Humbeline, sister of Saint Bernard of Clairvaux. He was known as an exceptional preacher and a miracle worker.
