= Pauline van de Ven =

Dutch writer (born 1956)

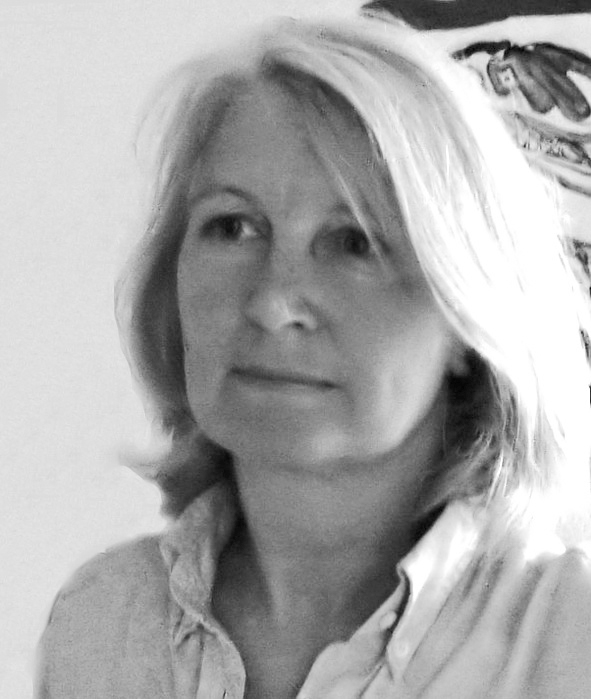
- Pauline van de Ven in 2011
- Born: 2 January 1956 (age 70); Houthem, Limburg, Netherlands
- Occupations: Writer, artist
- Writing career
- Language: Dutch
- Notable awards: Halewijn Prize 2014

Pauline van de Ven (born 2 January 1956) is a Dutch writer, visual artist and economist. She made her debut with Uitgeverij Balans in 1997 with the social satire Drijvend Paviljoen and wrote eight novels and a number of illustrated stories. In 2014 she received the Halewijn Prize for her entire oeuvre. Her digital painting has been awarded several times. In nonfiction she wrote the first Dutch newspaper article about the rise of Internet (NRC, 1984) and two books on economics, one a study of the depression of 1980-1984 (Balans 1985, co-authored with Pieter Lakeman) the other an analysis of stock market cascade mechanisms with an accurate prediction of the crash of 1987 (Balans, 1986).

== Biography ==
Pauline van de Ven was born in Houthem, and grew up in Bunde, a rural village in South Limburg. Her father was mayor of Bunde and Geulle, and her mother was a lawyer. The family with three children lived in Rustenburg in an idyllic environment of farmers and fruit growers near the river Geul, but fell apart when the mother died in 1963. Van de Ven was cared for by a farming and a mining family in the village and the manufacturing family of her grandparents. Under the father's second marriage, the family was reunited. Family relations were broken off around the time she finished high school. She sold magazines and movie tickets, priced books, filled cement bags, guided tourists and filled out policy numbers. Journalism was a long-cherished wish. She then worked on the economic editorial boards of Trouw, NRC, Intermediair and other media and graduated in 1995 in economics from the University of Amsterdam. In 1997 she made her debut at Uitgeverij Balans with the social satire Drijvend Paviljoen. In 2000 she wound up her work as a journalist to devote herself fully to writing and painting.

After she left publishing house De Geus, she founded the Auteursdomein in 2005, together with Eisjen Schaaf, a non-profit publisher and advocate for authors.

== Selected bibliography ==
- 1985 – Failliet op krediet, with Pieter Lakeman (non-fiction, Balans)
- 1986 – Stop-loss! (non-fiction, Balans)
- 1997 – Drijvend paviljoen (Balans)
- 2000 – Vrouw in het vogelhuis (De Arbeiderspers)
- 2001 – Ziel van Putter (Ad.Donker)
- 2003 – Het verhaal van de bamboesnijder (De Geus)
- 2006 – De man met de hoed (Ad.Donker)
- 2014 – Lily Dumont (novel, Auteursdomein)
- 2018 – Grachtenhuis (novel, Auteursdomein)

2019 – Digital Painting (non-fiction, Auteursdomein)

- 2021 – Dagboek 1999-2001 (Auteursdomein)
- 2024 – De Berg (Auteursdomein)
- 2025 – Isidoor Midleven (Auteursdomein)
- Bibliofiele uitgaven, geïllustreerd:
  - 2000 – The count of Königsberg (verhaal, linosnedes)
