= Guiraud =

French bishop and saint

Saint Guiraud

Bishop of Béziers
- Born: 1070; Puissalicon, France
- Died: 1123; Béziers, France
- Venerated in: Roman Catholic Church
- Feast: 5 November

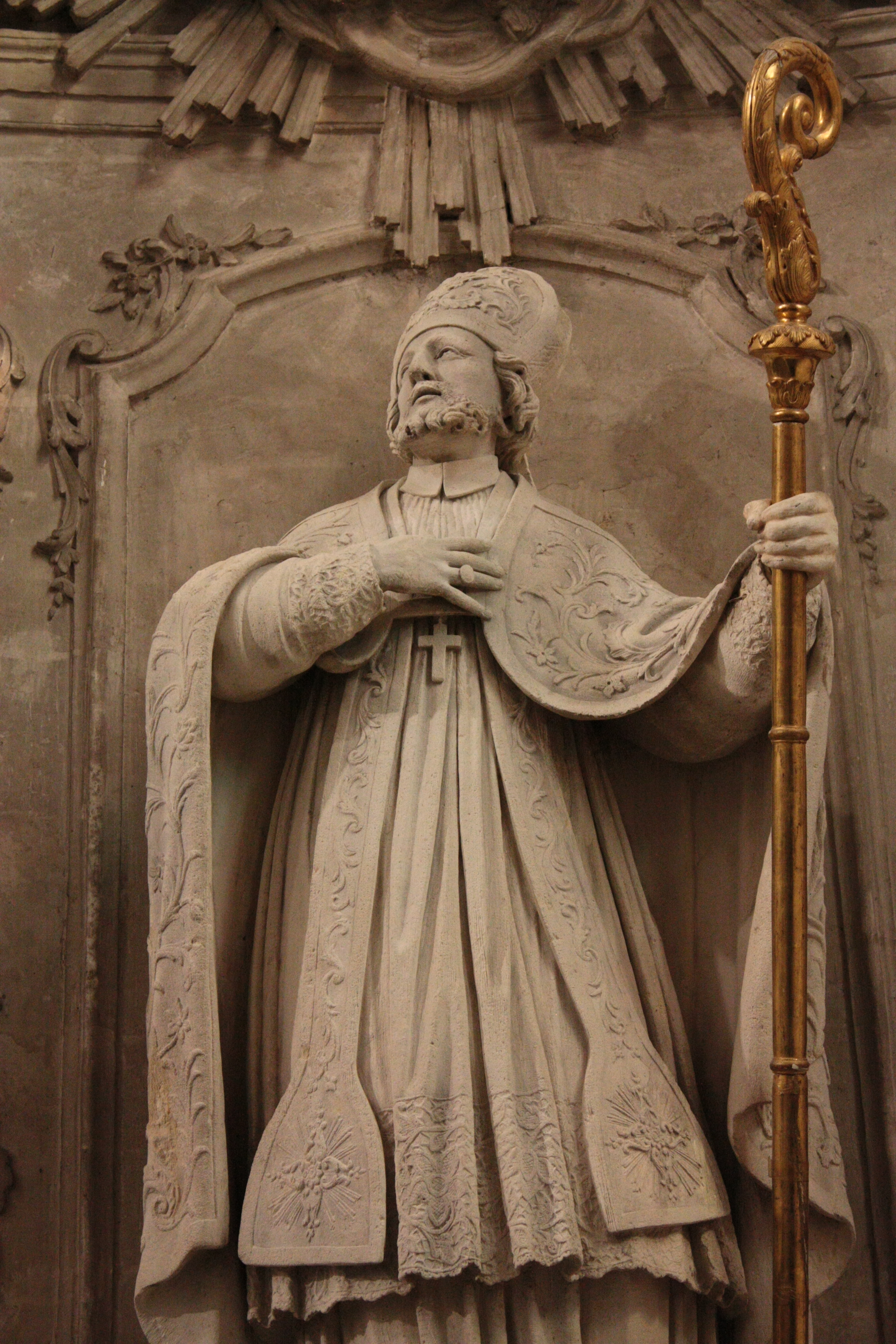

Guiraud (1070–1123) was a bishop of Béziers of the twelfth century

He is said to have been the second prior of the Canon Regular community at Cassan Abbey. He served as bishop from 1121 to November 5, 1123. He is a Catholic saint.

Born in Puissalicon, Guiraud later became the focus of local legends.

One legend states that when he was being baptized, the baptismal water began to boil. Legends also considered him to be of modest circumstances. However, several acts and charters have the signature "Guiraud of Puissalicon", indicating noble birth. He was buried near Aphrodisius, the legendary first bishop of the city.
