= Jos Frissen =

Dutch painter

Hubertus Josephus (Jos) Frissen (3 January 1892 in Houthem – 20 October 1982 in Kerkrade) was a Dutch painter.

== Life and work ==
Frissen was born in Houthem on 3 January 1892. He was a son of Joannes Josephus Frissen, bricklayer contractor (a company with approximately 20 employees) in Houthem-Sint Gerlach, and Anna Maria Martens. He enrolled in the Antwerp art academy in 1914, but was unable to attend because of the outbreak of the First World War. He was mobilized as a soldier. After the war he developed as a self-taught artist, in addition to his activities as an entrepreneur, initially in Houthem, later in Valkenburg.

Frissen mainly painted landscapes, in Limburg and the Ardennes, and southern Dutch folklore in an impressionistic style. In 1950 he founded the Valkenburg Art Circle 'Henri Jonas'. Frissen died in 1982 in Kerkrade, at the age of 90.

== Sources ==
- Th. v.d. Voort, Jos Frissen, De Schilder van het Geuldal (1972)
- Jan Schurgers, 57 Limburgse Beeldend Kunstenaars bijeengebracht in Valkenburg aan de Geul (2007) pag. 44/45, ISBN 978-90-812281-1-4
