= Château St. Gerlach =

Coordinates: 50°52′9″N 5°47′58″E

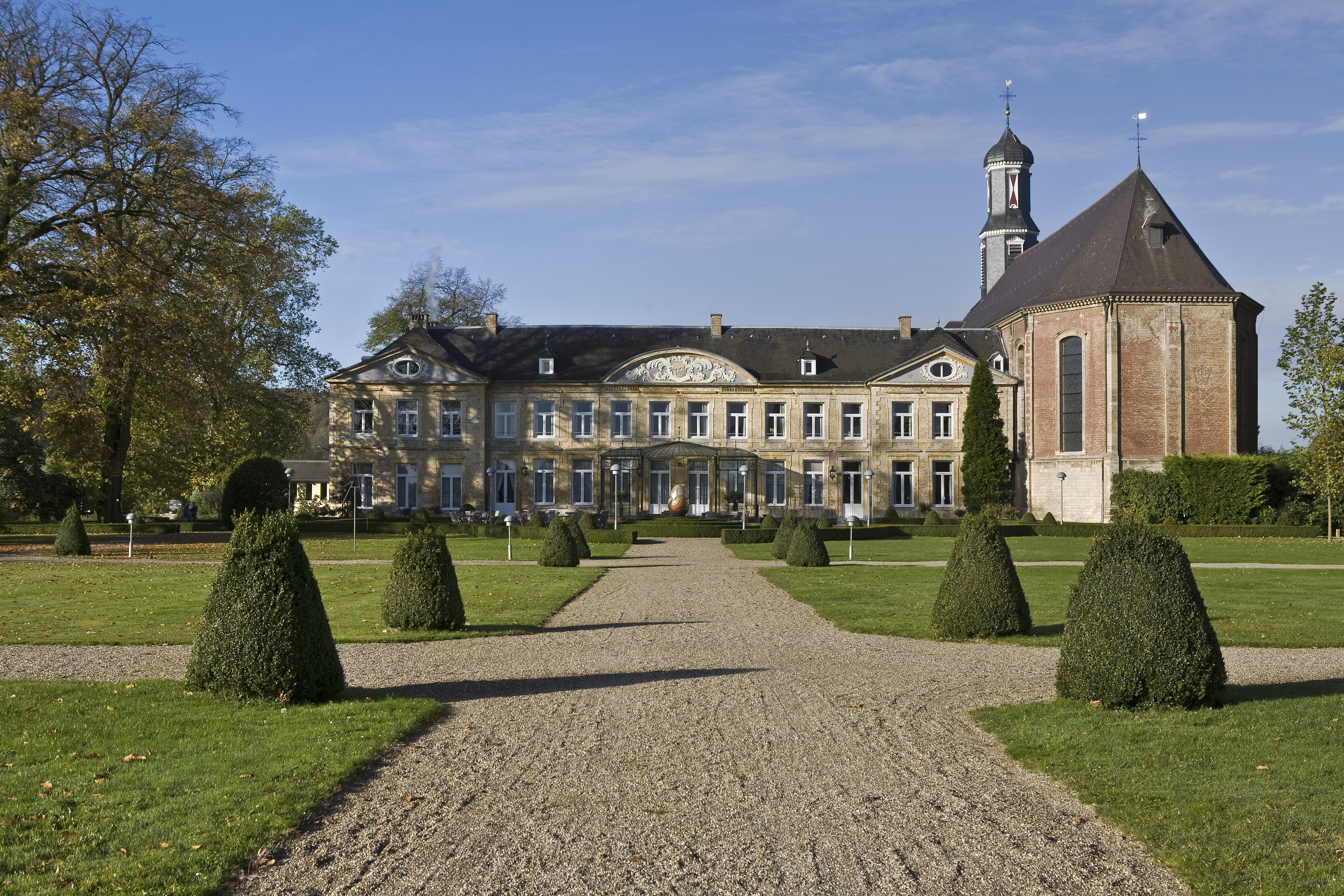
Château St. Gerlach

Château St. Gerlach, formerly St. Gerlach Monastery or Sint-Gerlachusstift, is located in the church village of Houthem in Valkenburg aan de Geul in the valley of the Geul river, in the province of Limburg, Netherlands. It was originally built in the twelfth century as a monastery of canons and functioned from the fourteenth century as noble ladies convent. In the nineteenth century, the monastery was converted into a castle-like country house. It includes a rectangular main building, a coach house and a castle farm . Since 1997, the complex at Joseph Corneli Allee has been a luxurious hotel, restaurant and conference center established. The building complex, including the Sint-Gerlachus Church and the surrounding gardens, includes several national monuments and is part of the Buitengoed Geul & Maas.

== History ==
The history of the castle begins in the mid-twelfth century with the hermit Gerlachus, who withdrew to the Geul Valley to pray and at the same time regularly make a pilgrimage to the tomb of Servatius of Maastricht. When he died in 1165, his grave became a place of pilgrimage for the local population because the people attributed miracles to him. After Gerlachus was canonized, Mr. Gosewijn IV from Valkenburg had a ( Norbertine ) monastery and a monastery church built at the grave. A mausoleum was built in the church, decorated for Gerlachus. In 1345 the monastery was transformed into a nunnery and many noble families sent their daughters who could not or would not marry here. An important visitor from the distant past was Charles the Bold. He once came as a pilgrim to pray at the tomb of the holy hermit. A sign with his name reminds of this.

In 1574, during the Eighty Years' War, the monastery was destroyed by Louis of Nassau during a campaign against the Spanish. However, in 1661 the monastery came under Spanish sovereignty again. Subsequently, it came back into Dutch hands via an exchange in 1786, after which the institute ladies left for the empty Carthusian monastery Bethlehem in Roermond.

After the French invasion in 1795, all monasteries in the occupied Netherlands were confiscated. Notary Schoenmaeckers, who had acted as the sisters' agent, then bought the complex. He had the monastery converted into a beautiful outside, after which it was referred to as a château. The monastery church was donated to the parish Houthem and served as a new parish church. The castle was successively inhabited by the Corneli and De Selys de Fanson families. As the last descendant of the De Selys de Fanson family, Robert lived in it until 1979, after which it bequeathed to the church council of the parish of Houthem. The castle and a number of outbuildings subsequently fell into serious disrepair.

During the Second World War, the castle was first occupied by the Germans and after the liberation by American soldiers. A hole in a large mirror above a mantelpiece was made by a pistol shot fired by one of the American soldiers.

== Current use ==
The current owner is the Limburg hotelier Camille Oostwegel, who was born in Houthem. In 1994, he was able to fulfill his childhood dream by buying the complex and starting an enormous restoration. It was opened on 15 September 1997 by Pieter van Vollenhoven. It functions as a hotel, restaurant, and conference center. According to the 'Five Star Alliance' hotel classification, it is one of the five five star hotels in the Netherlands. Most five-star hotels in the Netherlands are concentrated in the major cities of The Hague and Amsterdam. Château St. Gerlach is one of the few five-star hotels outside the Randstad.

In February 2002, twelve European bank presidents met here. They planted twelve plane trees in memory, which now form the Europalaan. A year later, the Euromonument, made by the Benedictine Brother Leo Disch, was unveiled. In 2014, The Rolling Stones spent the night at the hotel when they performed at the Pinkpop music festival.

A famous guest was US President George W. Bush. He stayed overnight in the hotel with his wife during a short visit to Limburg on the occasion of the commemoration of the end of the Second World War 60 years earlier. This commemoration took place at the Netherlands American Cemetery in Margraten.

In 2016, a major extension of the hotel was realized in the 17th-century Broers castle farm, which was acquired a year earlier. A conference center was also built after a design by Francine Houben.

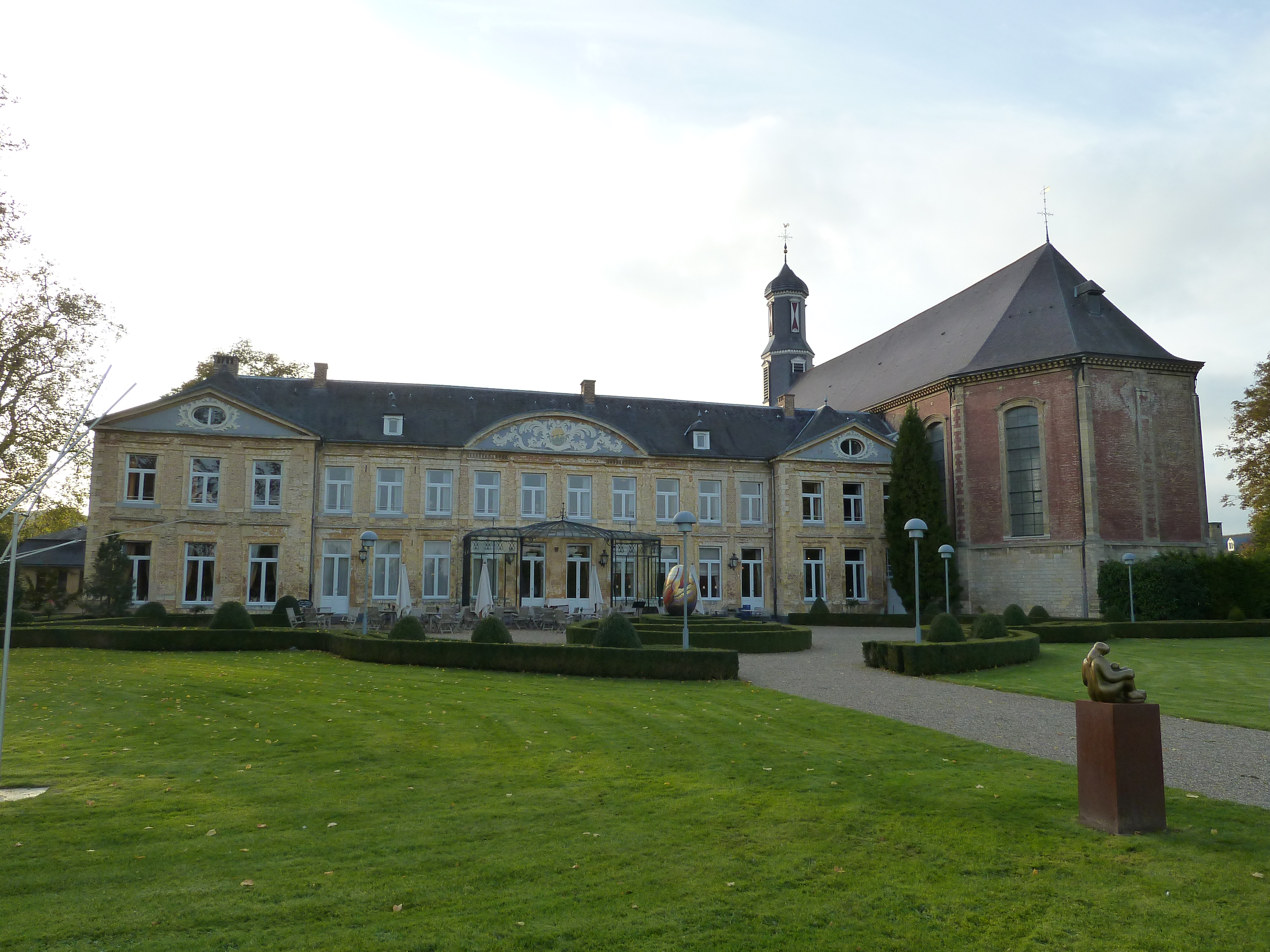
Kasteel en kerk

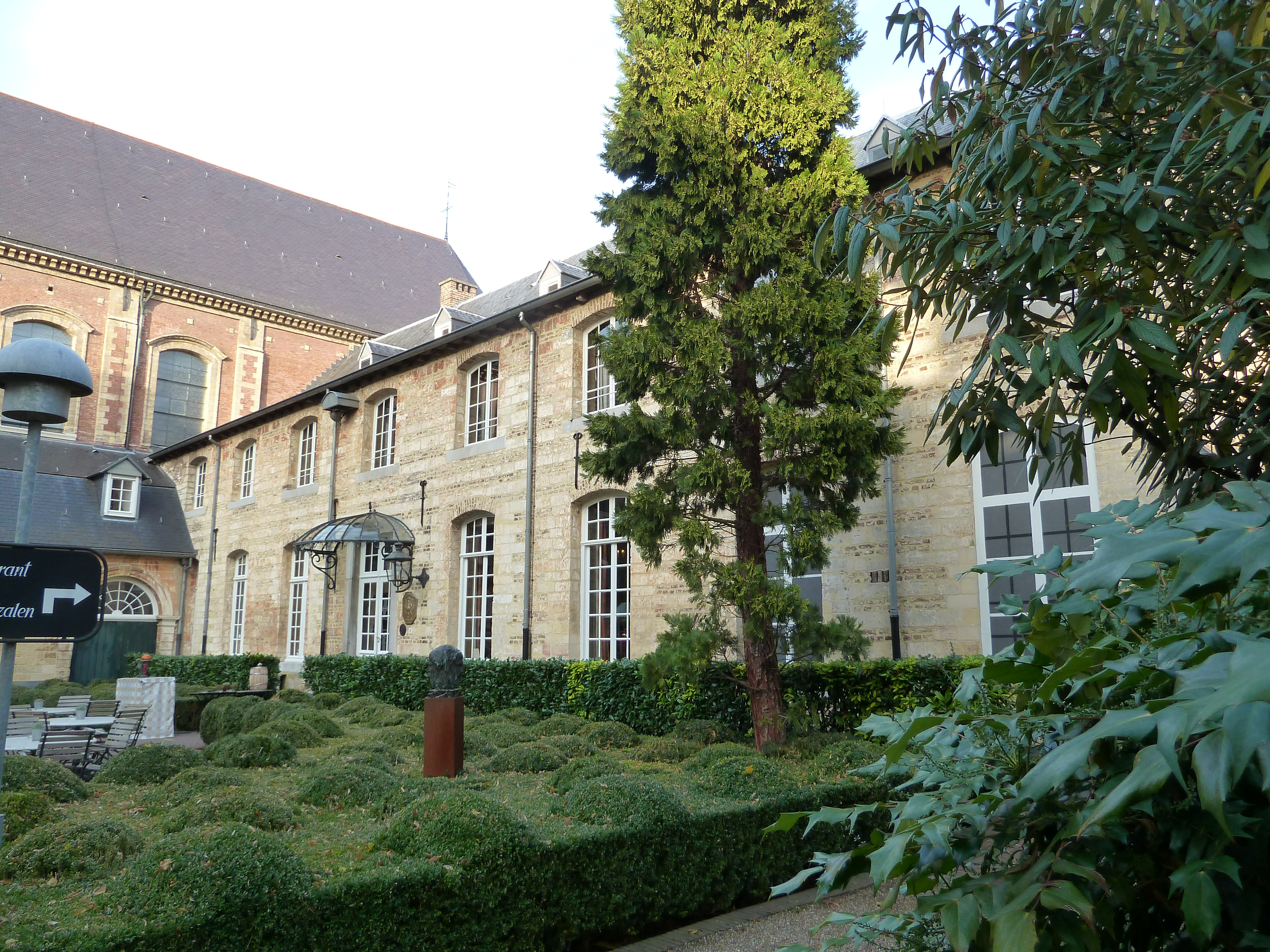
Achterzijde

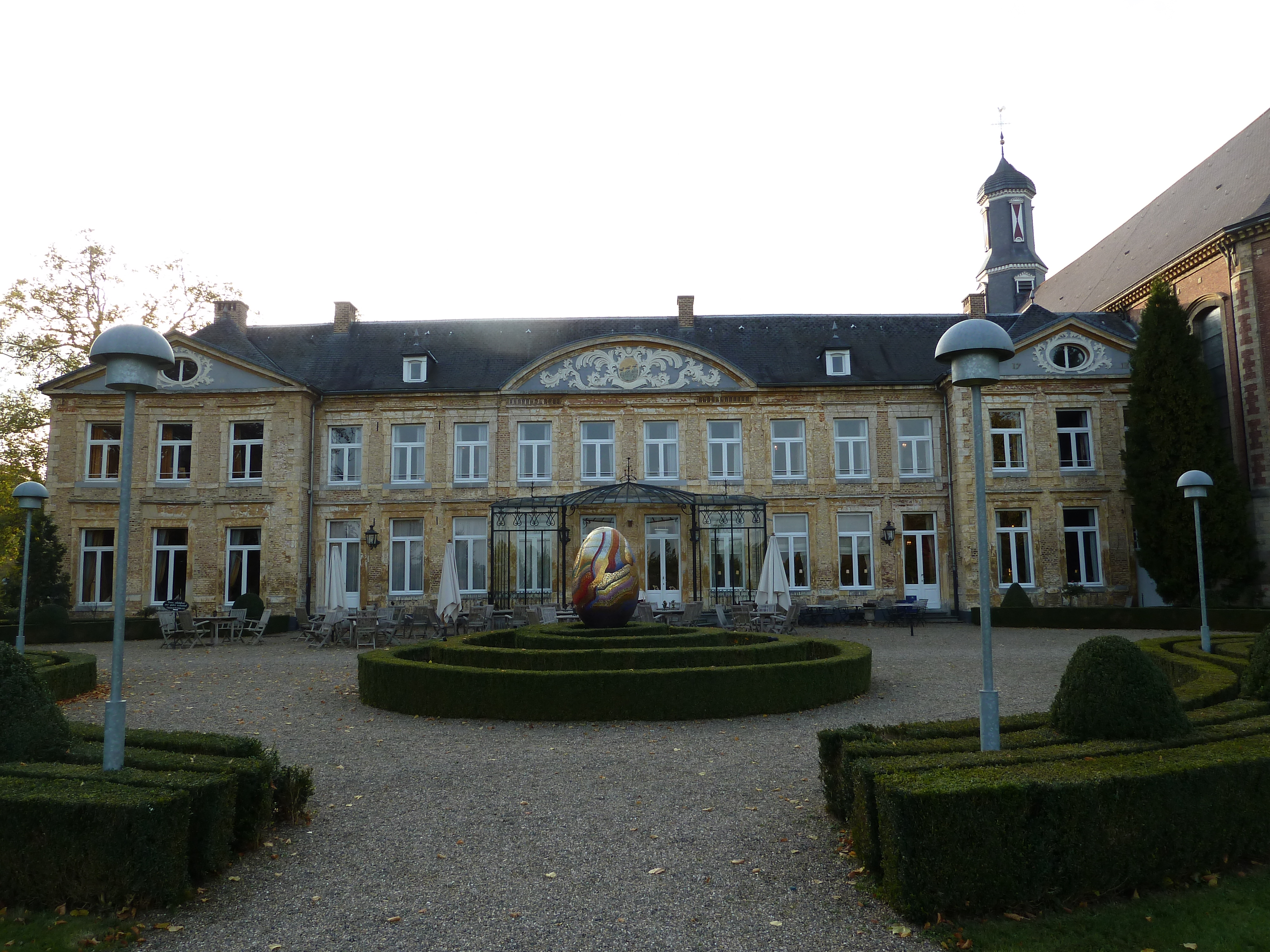
Voorgevel

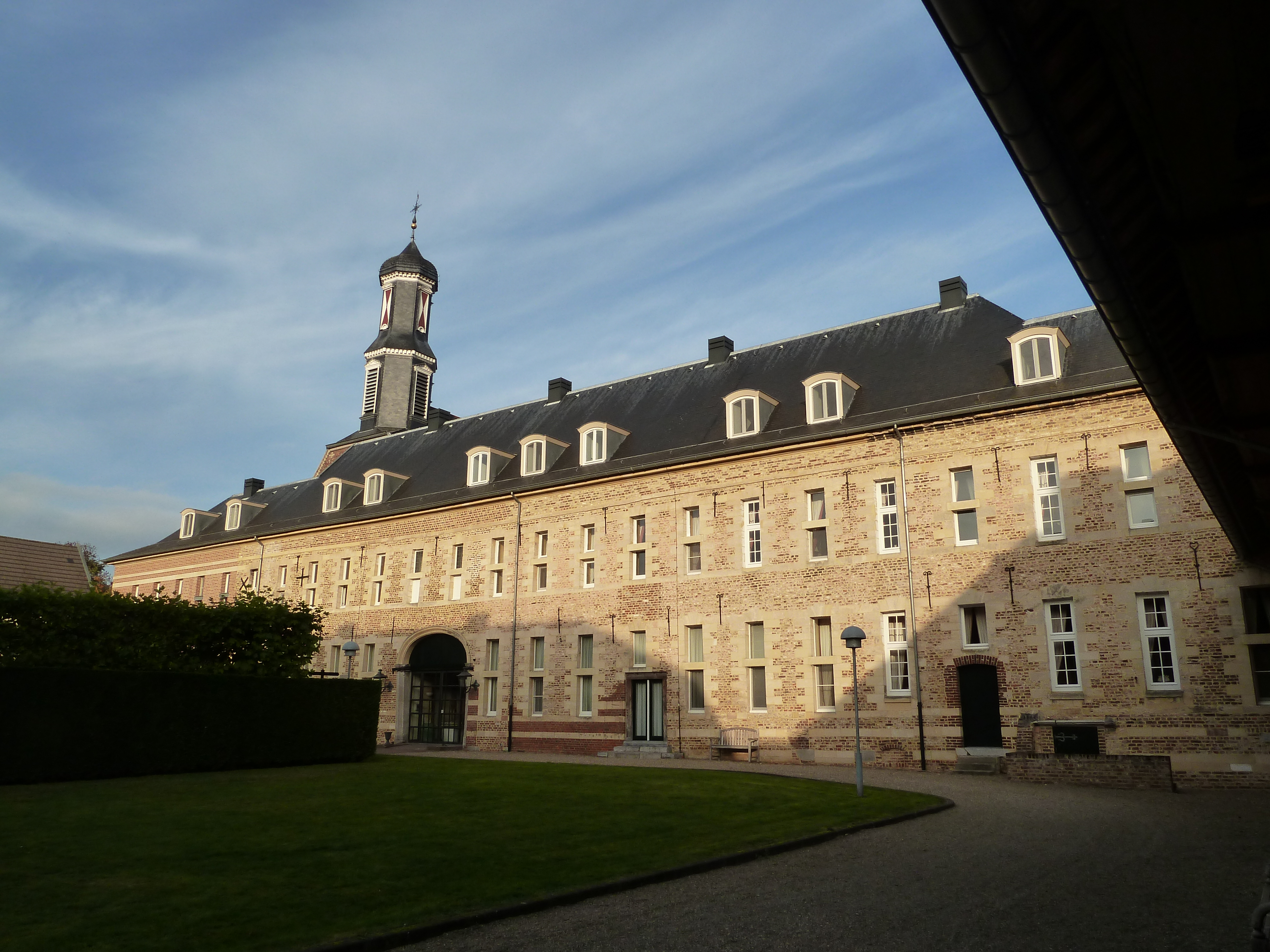
Westvleugel

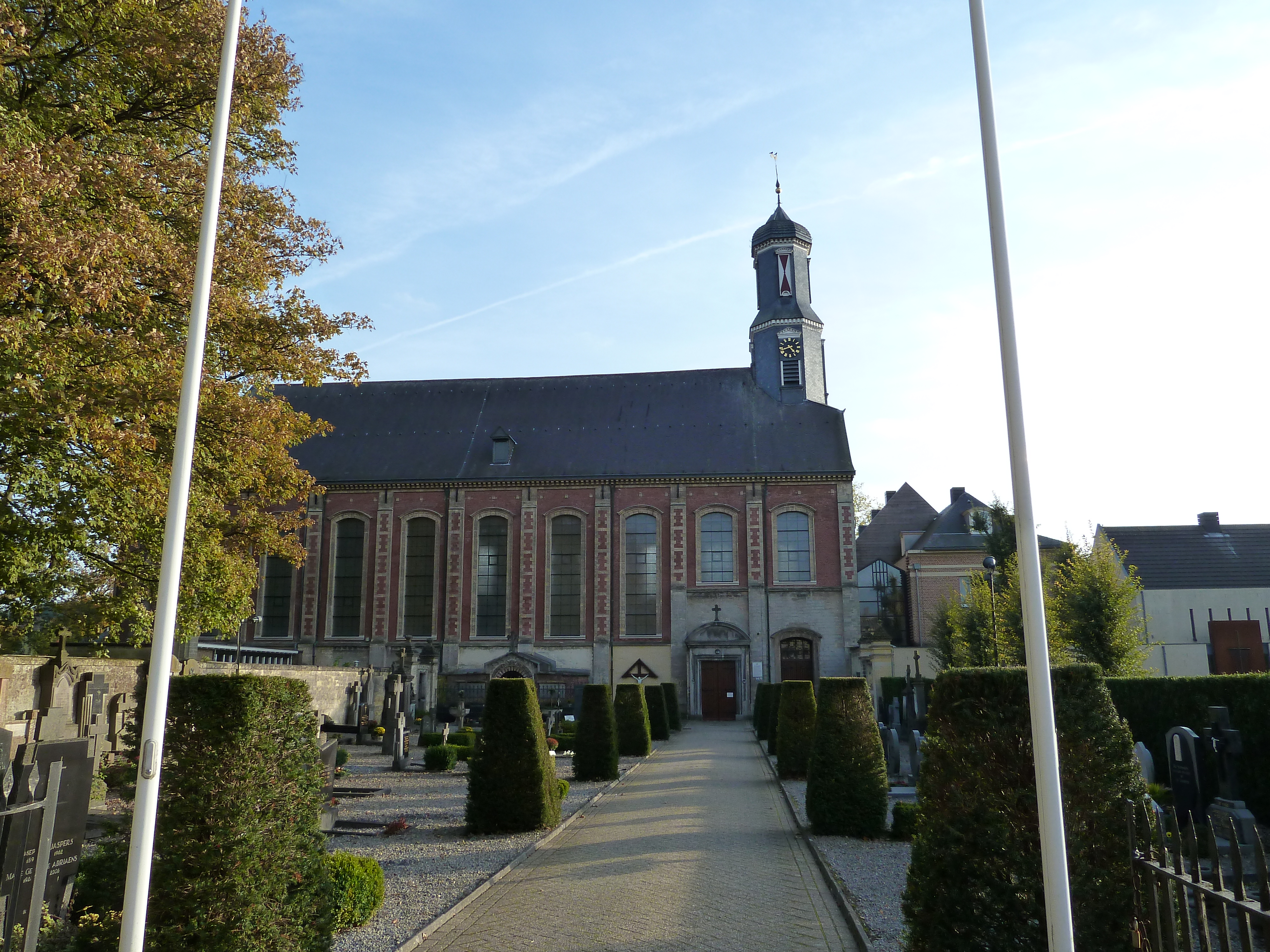
Kloosterkerk

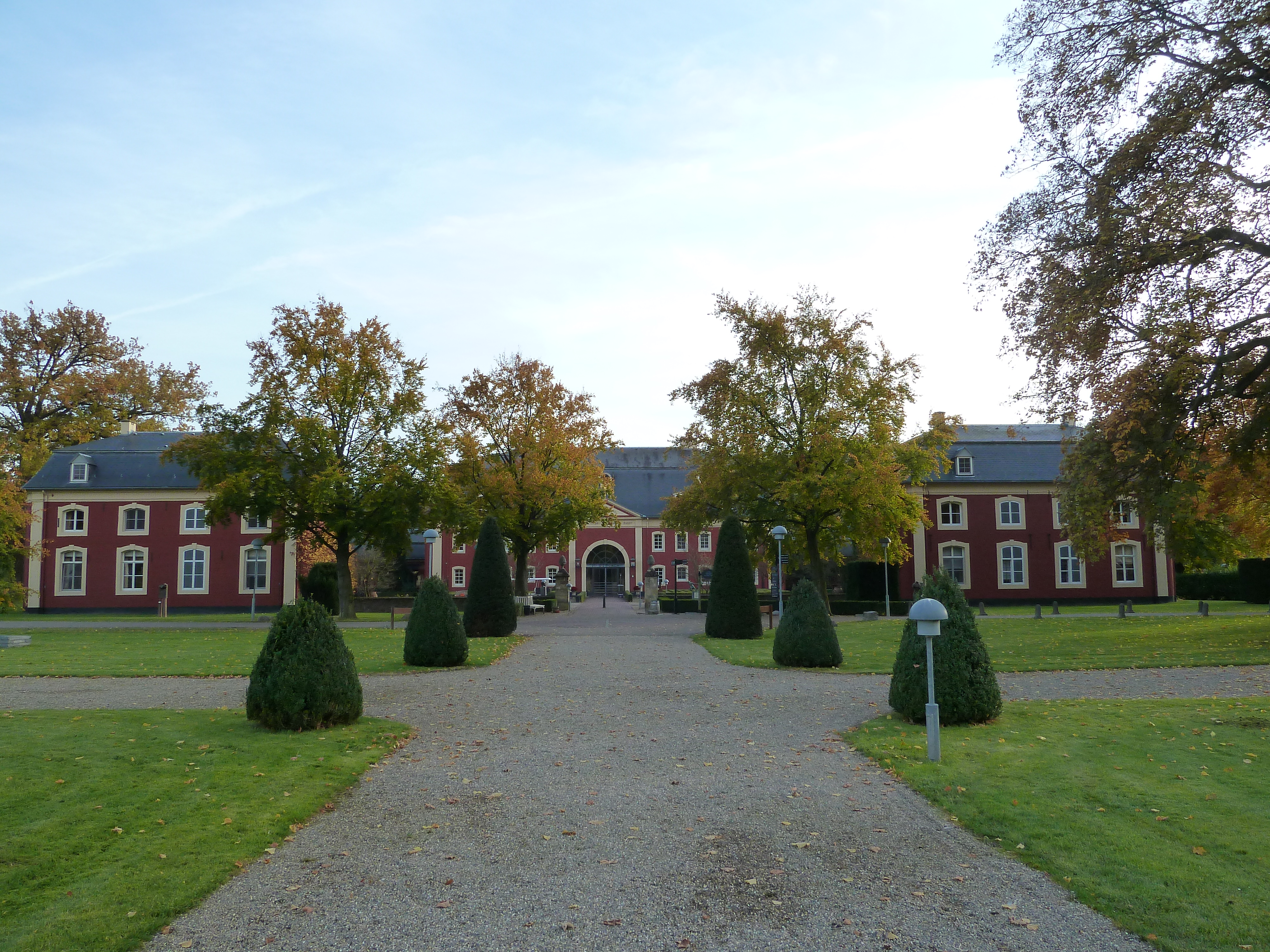
Pachthof

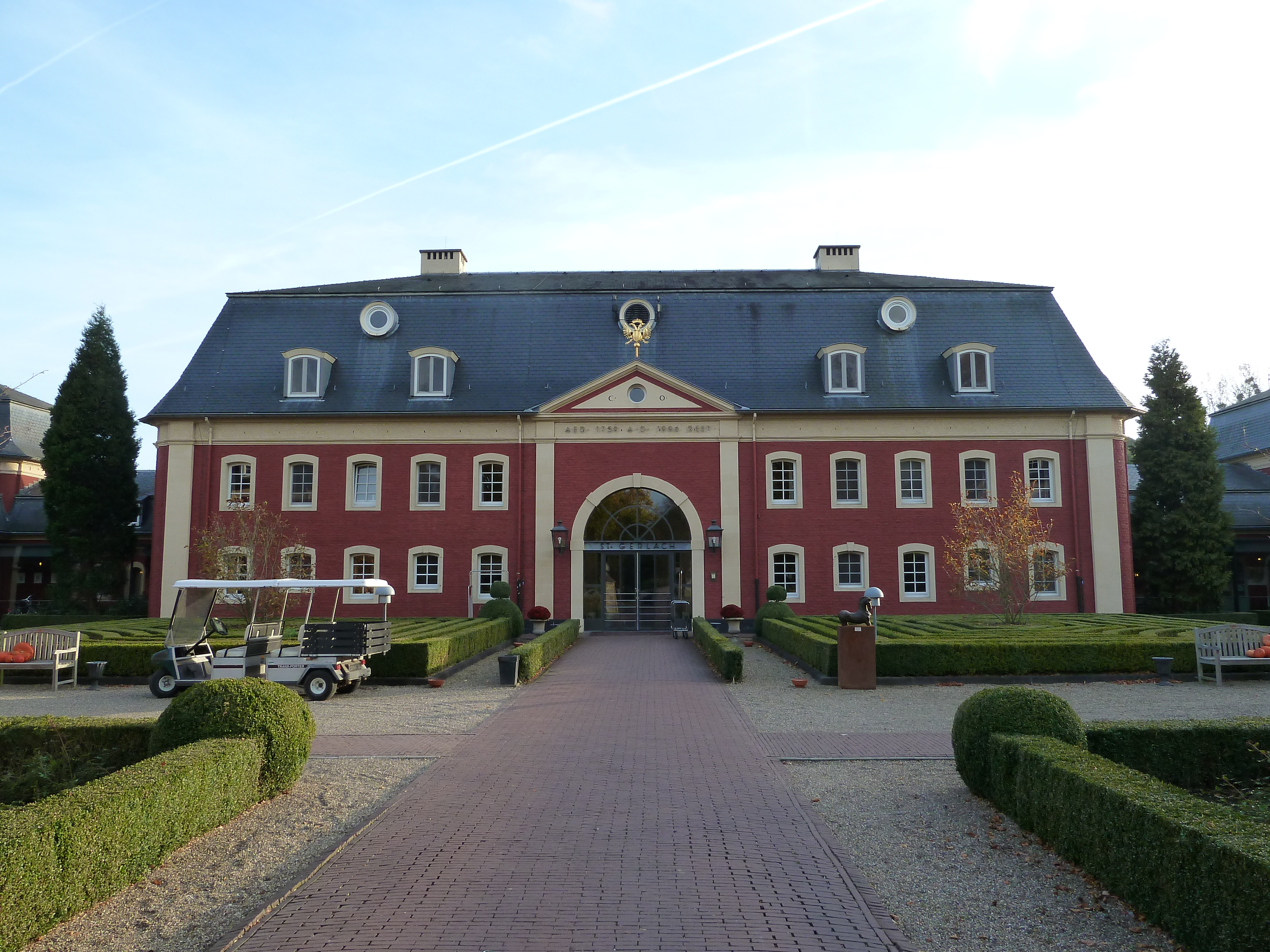
Hoofdgebouw

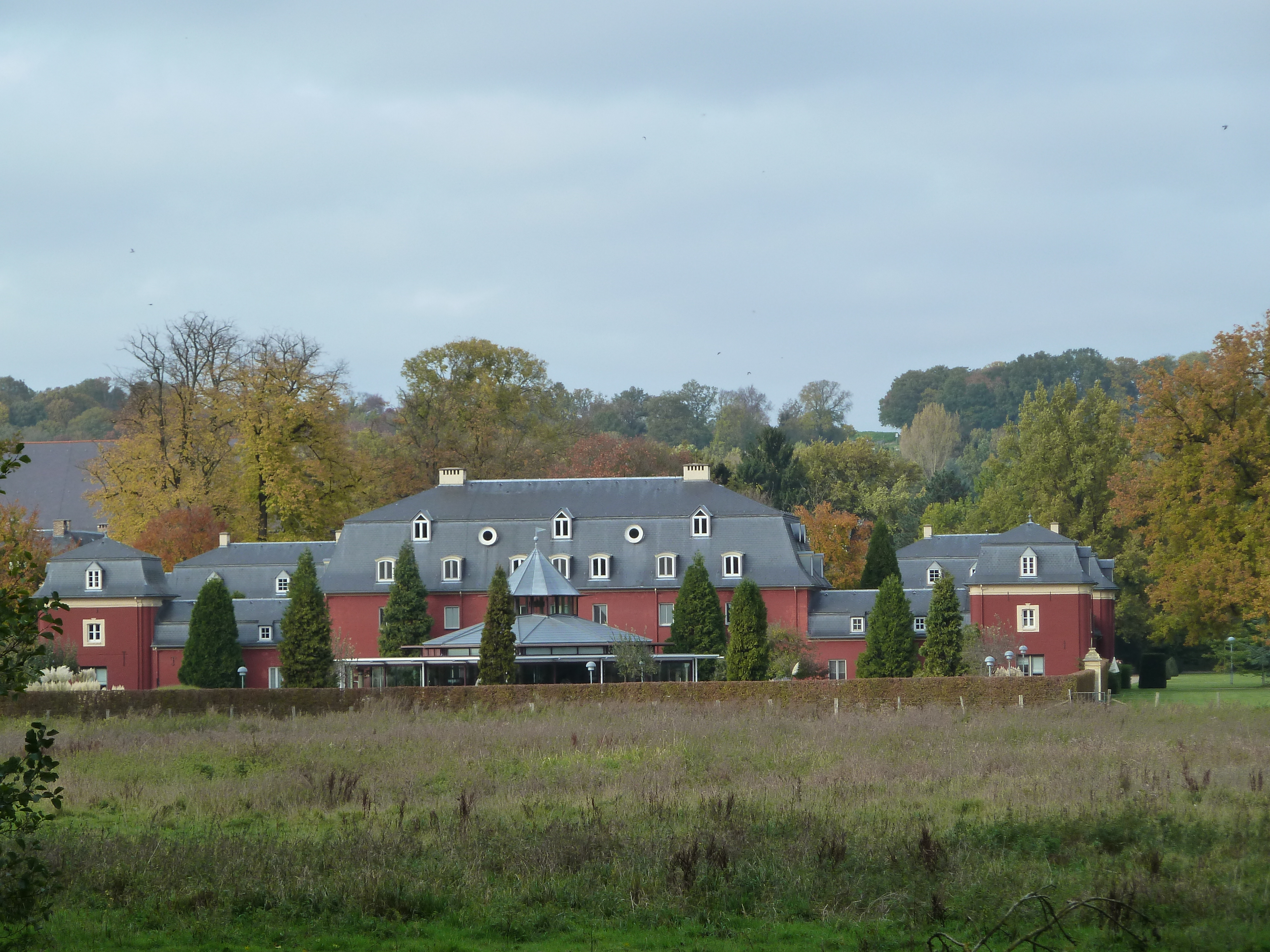
Vanaf de Geul

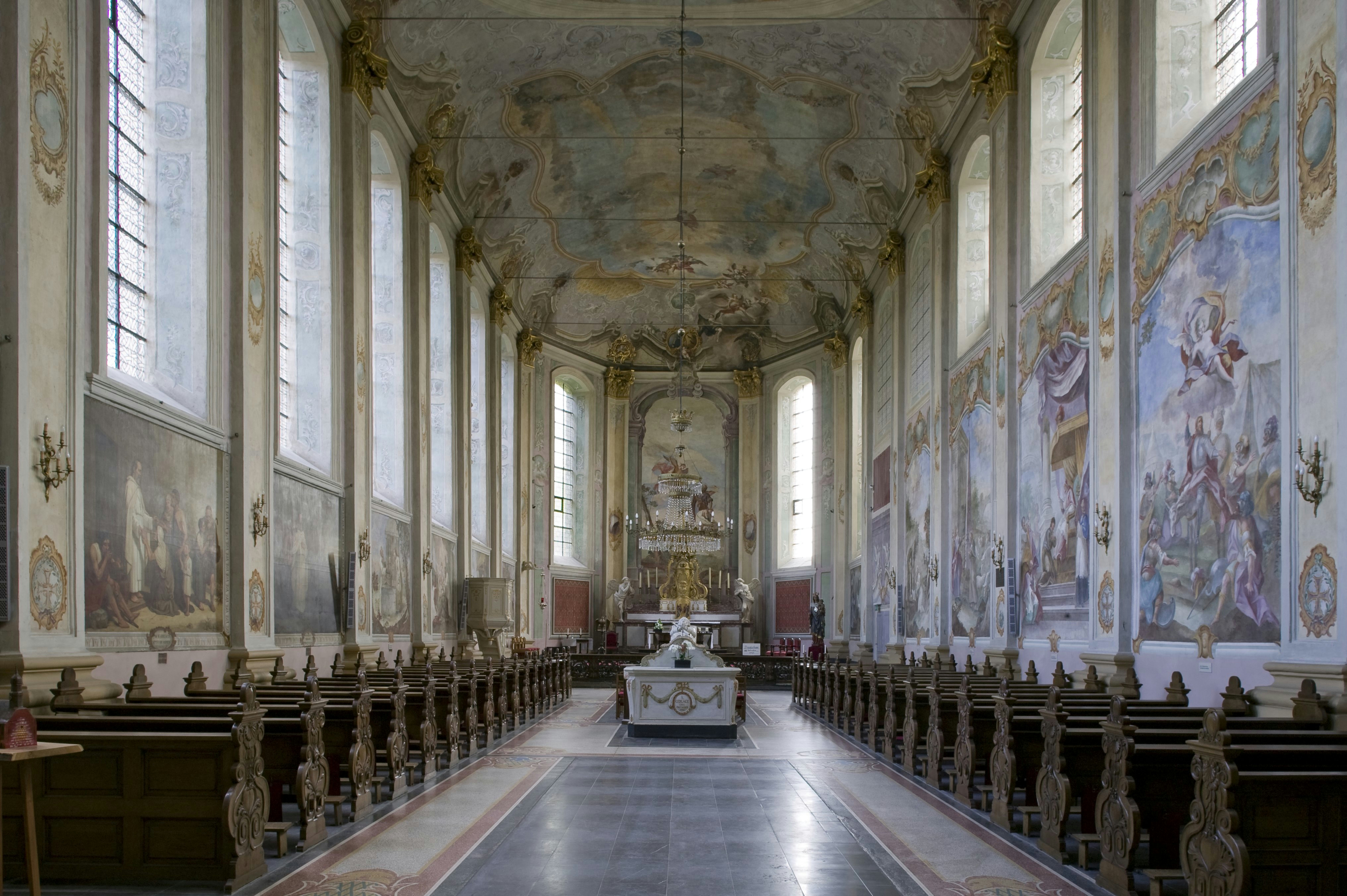
Inside the Sint-Gerlachus church

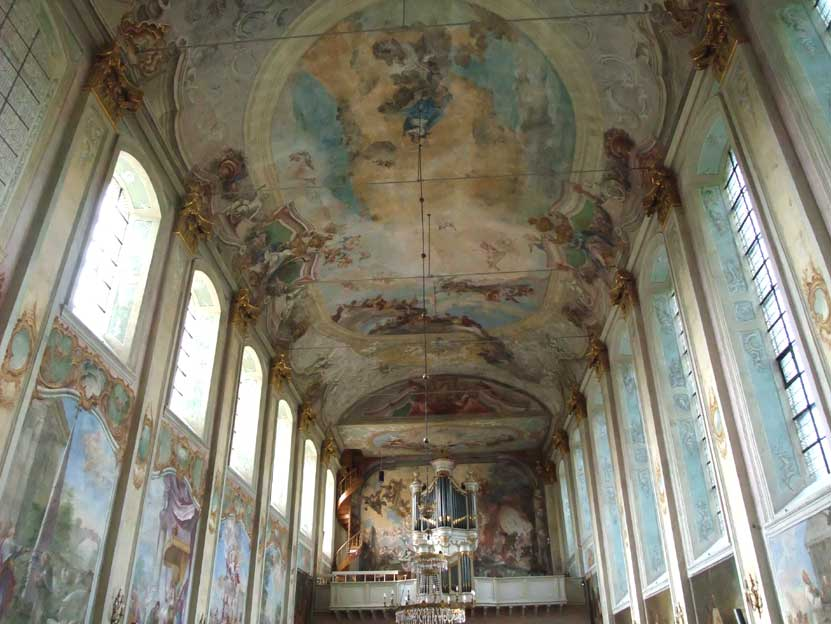
Inside the Sint-Gerlachus church
