= Richard of Vaucelles =

French Roman Catholic saint

Saint Richard of Vaucelles
- Born: England
- Died: 1169; Cambrai, France
- Venerated in: Roman Catholic Church
- Feast: 28 January

Richard of Vaucelles was an English Cistercian monk, who was appointed by St. Bernard as the second abbot of the Vaucelles Abbey, France. He is recognised as a saint with the feast day of 28 January.
