= Grimoald of Pontecorvo =

Italian Roman Catholic saint

Saint Grimoaldus
- Died: 1137
- Venerated in: Roman Catholic Church
- Feast: 29 September

Grimoaldus was Archpriest of Pontecorvo, Italy. Not much was known about his life but it is believed that he is of English descent.
