= Elizabeth Rose (nun) =

French Roman Catholic saint

Saint Elizabeth Rose
- Died: 1130; Rozoy le Vieil, Loiret, France
- Venerated in: Roman Catholic Church
- Feast: 13 December

Elizabeth Rose was a Benedictine nun at Chelles, France. She founded the convent of Sainte-Marie-du-Rozoy, near Courtenay, Loiret, France, and served as its first abbess. Eventually she retired to live as an anchoress in a hollow oak tree.
