= Chelidonia =

Italian Roman Catholic saint

Saint Chelidonia
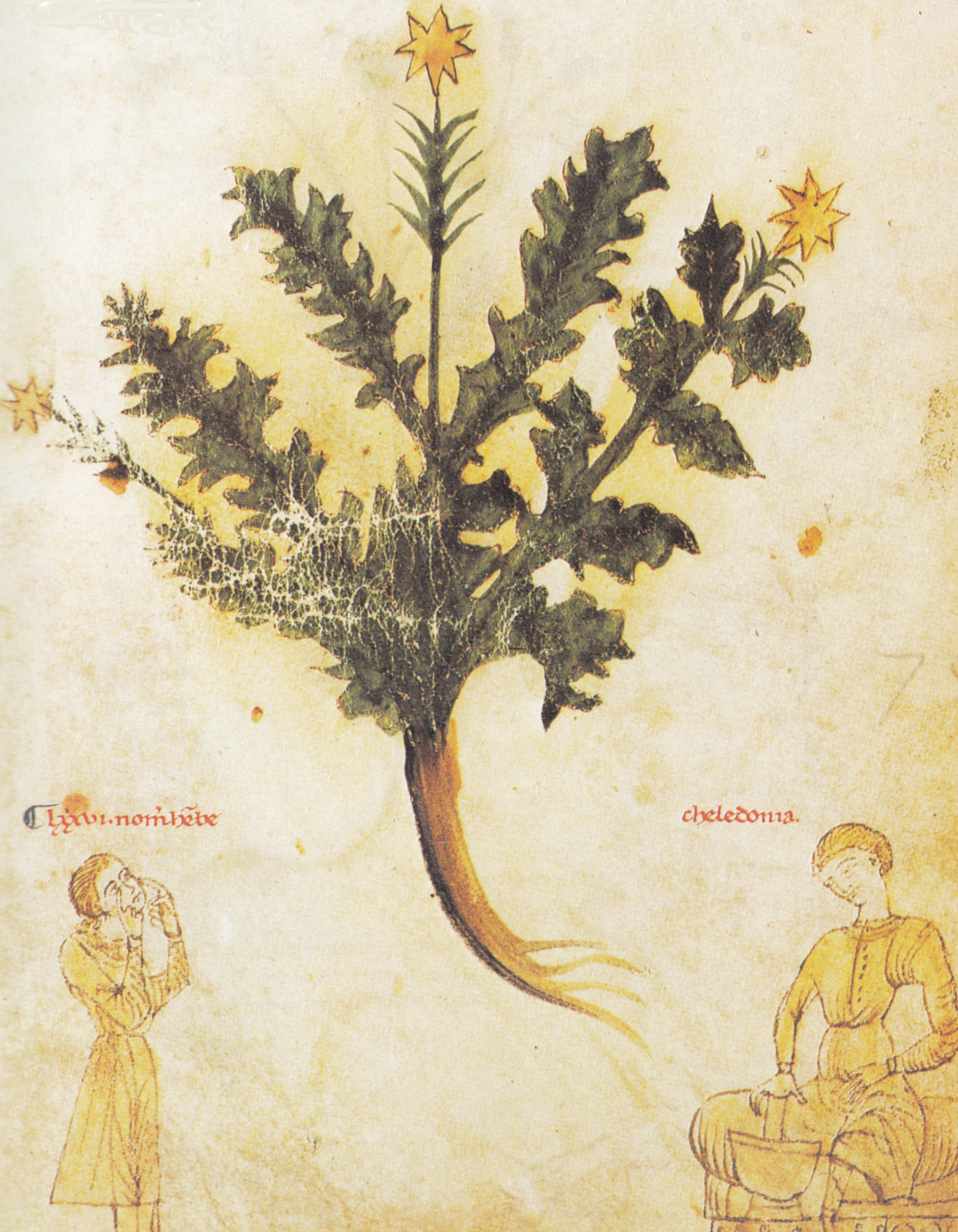
- Illustration of Chelidonia
- Born: Ciculum, Abruzzi, Italy
- Died: 1152; Subiaco, Italy
- Venerated in: Roman Catholic Church
- Major shrine: Church of St. Scholastica Subiaco, Italy
- Feast: 13 October
- Patronage: Subiaco, Italy

Chelidonia was a Benedictine hermitess. She was born in Ciculum, Italy, and became a recluse in the mountains near Subiaco, choosing a home, as a hermitess, in a cave now called Marra Ferogna. Chelidonia later received her habit from Cardinal Cuno of Frascati.
