= Landulf of Yariglia =

Italian Roman Catholic saint

Saint Landulf

Bishop of Asti
- Died: 1134; Asti, Italy
- Venerated in: Roman Catholic Church
- Feast: 7 June

Landulf of Yariglia (Italian: Beato Landolfo da Vareglate) was Benedictine Bishop of Asti, Italy.

He was born in the latter part of the eleventh century at ‘Vareglate’, which has been identified with the village of Vergiate to the north of Milan, and also with Variglié, a locality near Asti. He studied at the Benedictine monastery of San Pietro in Ciel d'Oro in Pavia, but did not become a monk.
