= Peter Pareuzi =

Italian Roman Catholic saint

Saint Peter Pareuzi

Martyr
- Born: Rome, Italy
- Died: 1199; Orvieto, Italy
- Venerated in: Roman Catholic Church
- Feast: 22 May

Peter Pareuzi was a Papal legate and martyr. He was from Rome and served the papacy. As a papal legate, he was sent to Orvieto in 1199, to enter into dialogue with the Cathars, who were troubling the local church. Peter then suffered martyrdom, at the hands of the Cathars.
