= Hugh of Noara =

Italian Roman Catholic saint

Saint Hugh of Noara
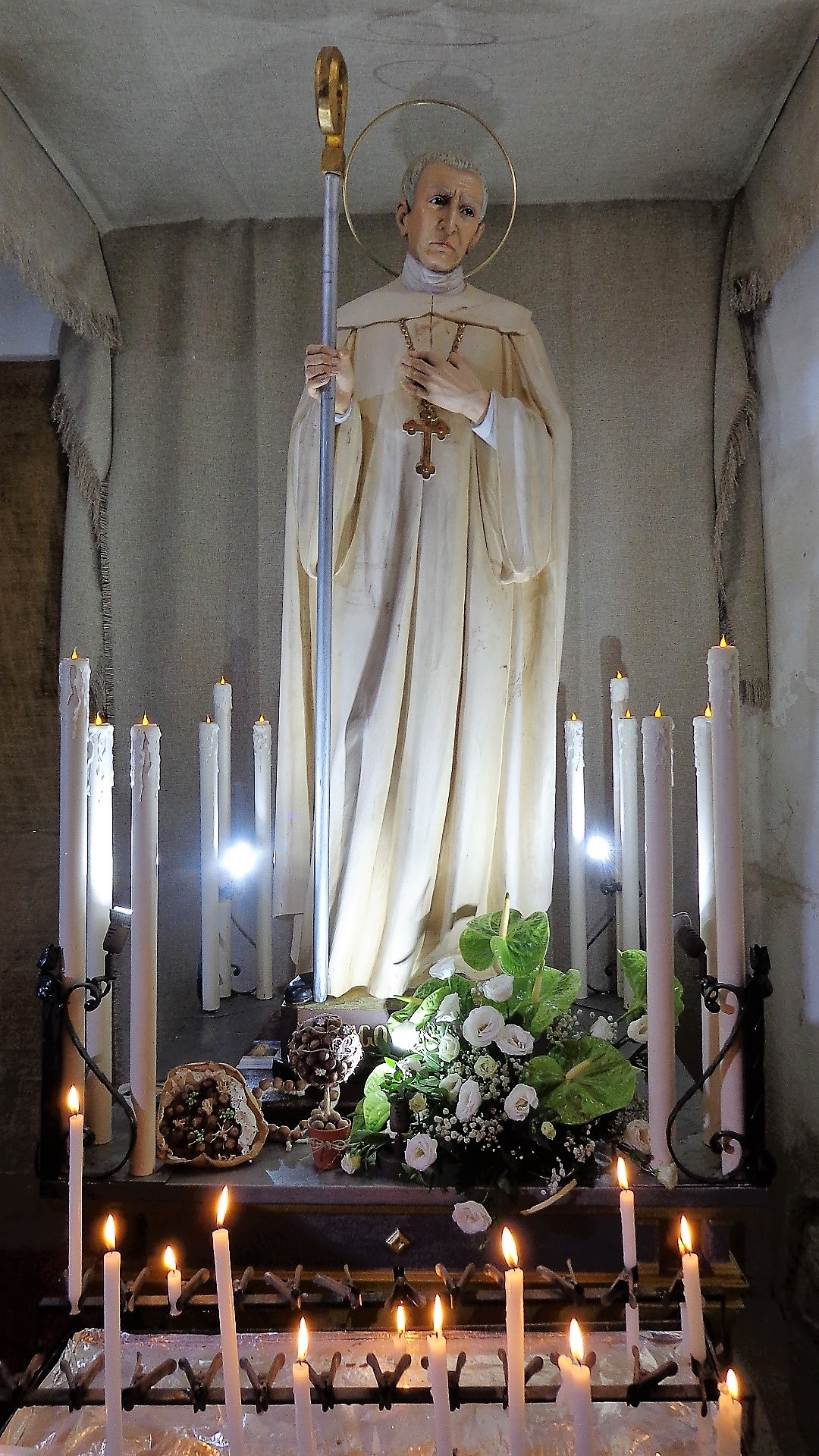
- Saint Hugo, Cistercian Abbot, Badia Vecchia di Novara di Sicilia.
- Born: France
- Died: 1170; Novara, Sicily
- Venerated in: Roman Catholic Church
- Feast: 17 November (Roman Catholic Church) 16 August (Novara, Sicily)
- Patronage: Novara, Sicily

Hugh of Noara or of Novara, also known as Ugo of Novara and Hugo of Novara, was a Cistercian monk and a disciple of Bernard of Clairvaux. French by birth, he served as the first abbot of Novara Abbey, Sicily, where he remained until his death in 1170.

== Biography ==
In the last years of the decade 1130–1140, Roger II of Sicily, driven by political interests, asked the Abbot of Clairvaux to send his monks to the Kingdom of Sicily. After an initial refusal Bernard of Clairvaux sent the monks from Moterola in Spain, who initially settled in Calabria in the monastery of Santa Maria Requisita Nucis, founded in 550, and which became the Abbey of Santa Maria della Sambucina near Cosenza, the first Cistercian abbey in southern Italy. Hugh, of French nationality, had been one of the twenty monks in the retinue of Bernard of Clairvaux when he left the Abbey of Cîteaux to found the Abbey of Clairvaux, was among the monks who came from Moterola.

King Roger then wanted the Cistercians to complete in Sicily the construction of a monastery begun near Novara di Sicilia in 1137. From Sambucina the monks settled in the monastery built in a valley in the territory of Novara, in the area called San Basilio, replacing the Basilian monks with the monks of the Cistercian Order. They called the valley Bona because of the mildness of the place and the fertility of the land according to the Cistercian custom. The monastery was structurally completed in 1167, canonically erected in 1171.

Hugh was the first abbot of the monastery named after Maria Santissima Annunziata, later called Abbey of Santa Maria di Novara Vallebona, the first Cistercian monastery in Sicily. He was entrusted with the management of the monastery having as his companions the monks Paul, Eligius and Mark, the latter becoming his successor as abbot. Hugh brought many relics of saints to Novara. Most of them are now kept in the reliquary altar in the church of Sant'Ugo abbot or "Abbazia di Sant'Ugo" in Novara di Sicilia.

The monastery of Vallebona, a secondary possession of the Sambucina, soon became the main dependency. The monks quickly spread Cistercian teaching in many places in Sicily, where monasteries were founded, such as the Abbey of Santa Maria di Novara: Badiazza, the Abbey of Santa Maria di Roccamadore and the Abbey of Santa Maria di Altofonte.

After many years, Hugh died in Novara di Sicilia on 17 November. The year of his death is unknown: in 1175 the abbot Marco is documented as prior of the monastery.

== Veneration ==
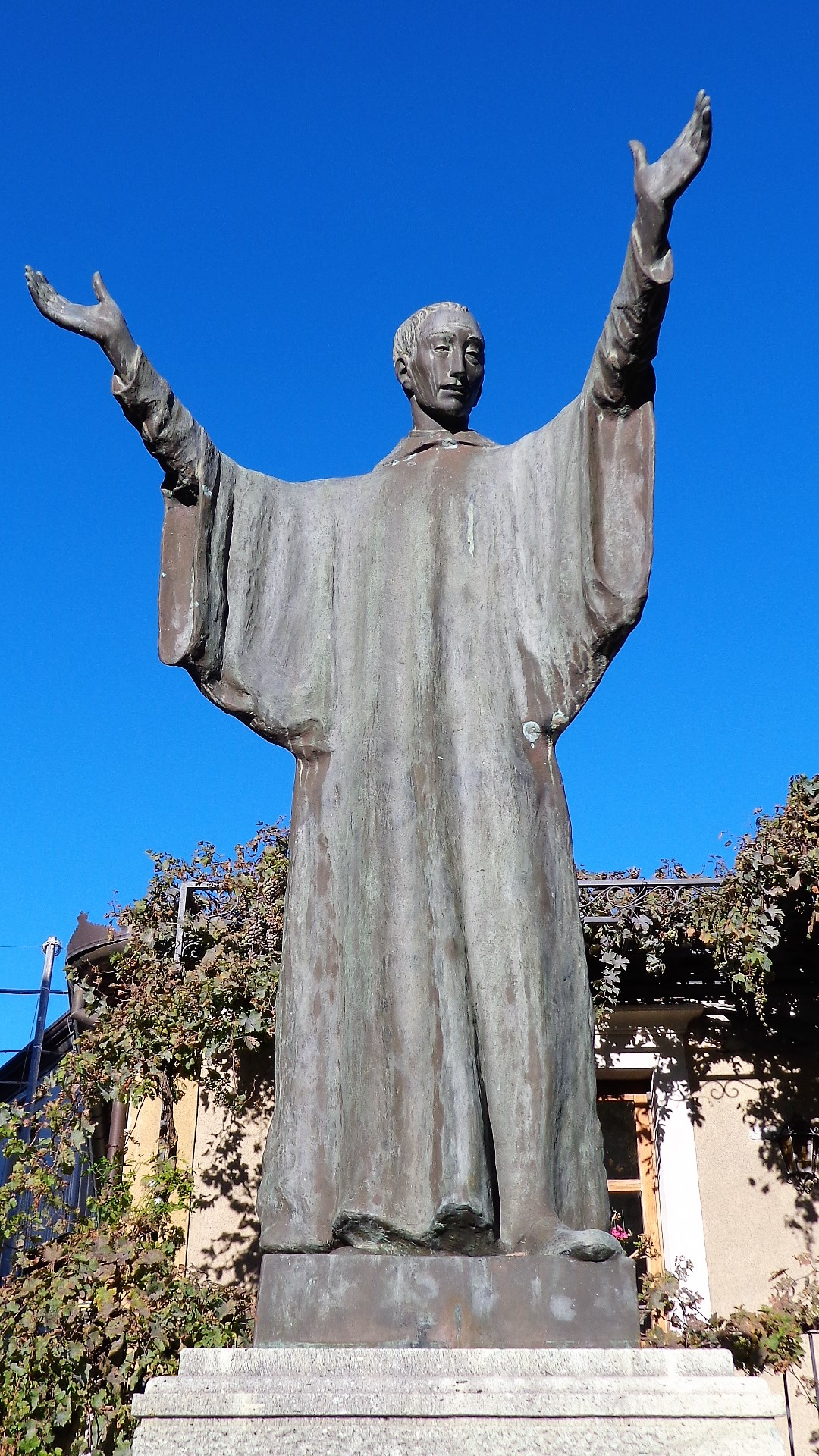
St. Hugo monument, Novara di Sicilia

The liturgical memory of Hugh the Abbot is reported in the Roman Martyrology on November 17: "In Novara of Sicily, St. Hugh, abbot, who, sent by St. Bernard of Clairvaux, began the Cistercian Order in this land and in Calabria." (Roman Martyrology)

Hugh was proclaimed patron saint of Novara di Sicilia in 1666. The feast of Hugh the Abbot is celebrated on August 16 in Novara di Sicilia city and on November 17 (or the Sunday immediately following) at the Abbey of St. Mary of Novara in the Church of Saints Basil and Mark. On the day of the liturgical feast, November 17, the relics are brought for public veneration from "Badiavecchia" or "Abbazia di Sant'Ugo" to the Royal Abbey of Santa Maria la Noara.

He is invoked by the people of Novara during periods of drought.

An ivory casket, found in the Abbey of Santa Maria di Novara and believed to be the personal possession of Hugh is dated around 1140. Its valuable inlay makes it particularly precious. Along with it, there is also a cylindrical wooden casket and an oval casket also gifts of Hugh. The containers come from Islamic craft workshops that were operating in Sicily at the time. These objects are exhibited in the rooms of the Cathedral Museum of Santa Maria Assunta.
