= Bernard of Valdeiglesias =

Saint Bernard of Valdeiglesias
- Died: c. 1155
- Venerated in: Roman Catholic Church
- Feast: 20 August
- Patronage: Candeleda, Spain

Bernard of Valdeiglesias (or "of Candeleda") was a Benedictine Cistercian monk at Valdeiglesias, province of Avila, Spain.

== Life ==
Bernard joined the Cistercians in 1177. He was sent with a group of other monks to establish a monastery at Grandassilva in Estremadura, which effort failed when the community was devastated by the plague.

He is Patron saint of Candeleda, Spain, and is invoked against rabies.
