= Herbert Hoscam =

Italian Roman Catholic saint

Saint Herbert Hoscam

Archbishop of Conza, Italy
- Born: England
- Died: 1180; Conza, Italy
- Venerated in: Roman Catholic Church
- Feast: 20 August
- Patronage: Conza, Italy

Herbert Hoscam (died 1180) was an Englishman who served as an Archbishop in Italy.

He was of English birth, and served as prelate to Irpinia area, as the Archbishop of Conza.

His feast day is August 20.
