= Novara di Sicilia =

- Comune
- Comune di Novara di Sicilia
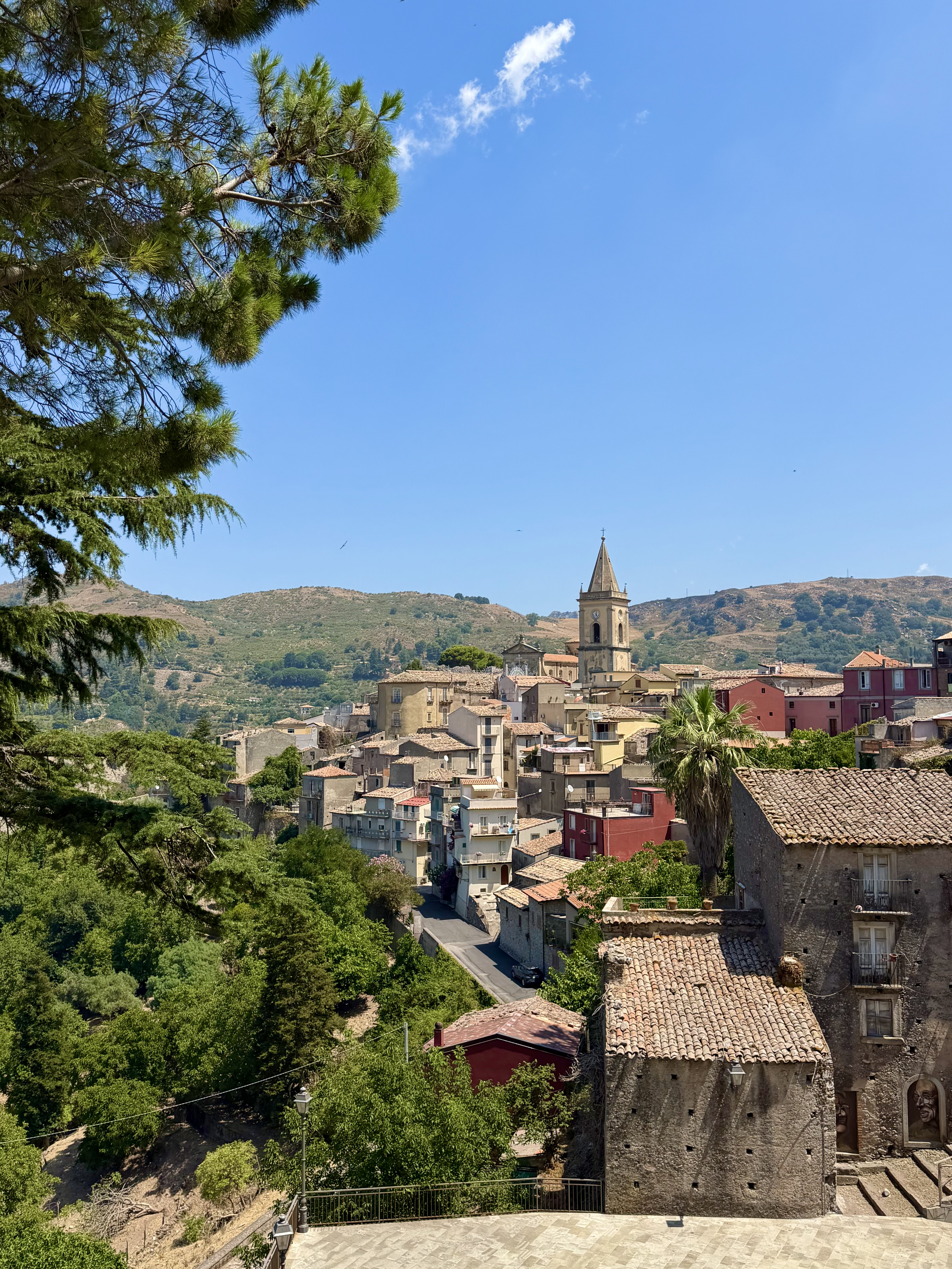

- Location within Italy Location within Sicily
- Coordinates: 38°1′N 15°8′E
- Country: Italy
- Region: Sicily
- Metropolitan city: Messina (ME)
- Frazioni: San Basilio, San Marco, Vallancazza, Piano Vigna, Badia Vecchia

Government
  - Mayor: Girolamo Bertolami

Area
  - Total: 48.8 km^{2} (18.8 sq mi)
- Elevation: 650 m (2,130 ft)

Population (30 November 2011)
  - Total: 1,414
  - Density: 29.0/km^{2} (75.0/sq mi)
- Demonym: Novaresi
- Time zone: UTC+1 (CET)
  - Summer (DST): UTC+2 (CEST)
- Postal code: 98058
- Dialing code: 0941
- Patron saint: Assumption of Mary, St. Hugh Abbot
- Saint day: August 15 and 16
- Website: Official website

Novara di Sicilia is a comune in the Metropolitan City of Messina in Sicily, Italy.

== Toponymy ==
The earliest known name of the area was Noa, a Sicani word for fallow field. The name later evolved to Nouah and then Novara. The attribute ‘di Sicilia’ was added to distinguish it from the city of the same name in Piedmont.

== History ==
There is archaeological evidence of Mesolithic habitation. Pliny mentions the Roman city of Noa, and its inhabitants the Noeni.

Lombards settled there in 1061–72. During the time of the Norman Kingdom of Sicily, in 1171 Hugh of Châteaneuf founded the Abbey of Santa Maria Nucaria. In the 1200s a castle was built by Roger of Lauria.

The lands passed to the Palizzis and then in 1364 to Vinciguerra d’Aragona. In 1641 the fief was granted to the wife of Marcantonio Colonna.

The village peaked in the 1600s with the development of a dense network of alleys and lanes, and the considerable array of decorative elements on the houses, carved in local sandstone, cipollino, and marble.

== Geography ==
It is about 160 kilometres (99 mi) east of Palermo and some 40 kilometres (25 mi) southwest of Messina. It borders the following municipalities: Fondachelli-Fantina, Francavilla di Sicilia, Mazzarrà Sant'Andrea, Rodì Milici, Tripi. It is one of I Borghi più belli d'Italia ("The most beautiful villages of Italy").
