= Hatebrand =

Saint Hatebrand
- Born: Frisia, Netherlands
- Died: 1198; Frisia, Netherlands
- Venerated in: Roman Catholic Church
- Feast: 30 July

Hatebrand was a Benedictine abbot. A native of Frisia, Netherlands, he became the Abbot of Olden-Klooster, Frisia in 1183. He is famed for having revived the Benedictine order, in the area of Frisia. His relics are at Sint-Benedictuskerk in Mortsel.
