= Florentius of Carracedo =

Saint Florentius of Carracedo
- Died: 1156
- Venerated in: Roman Catholic Church
- Feast: 10 December

Florentius of Carracedo was Benedictine abbot at Carracedo, Spain, who was held with great regard by King Aiphonsus VII of Leon and Castile, Spain. His monastery adopted the Cistercian rule, after the death of Florentius, in 1156.
