= Molesme =

- Commune
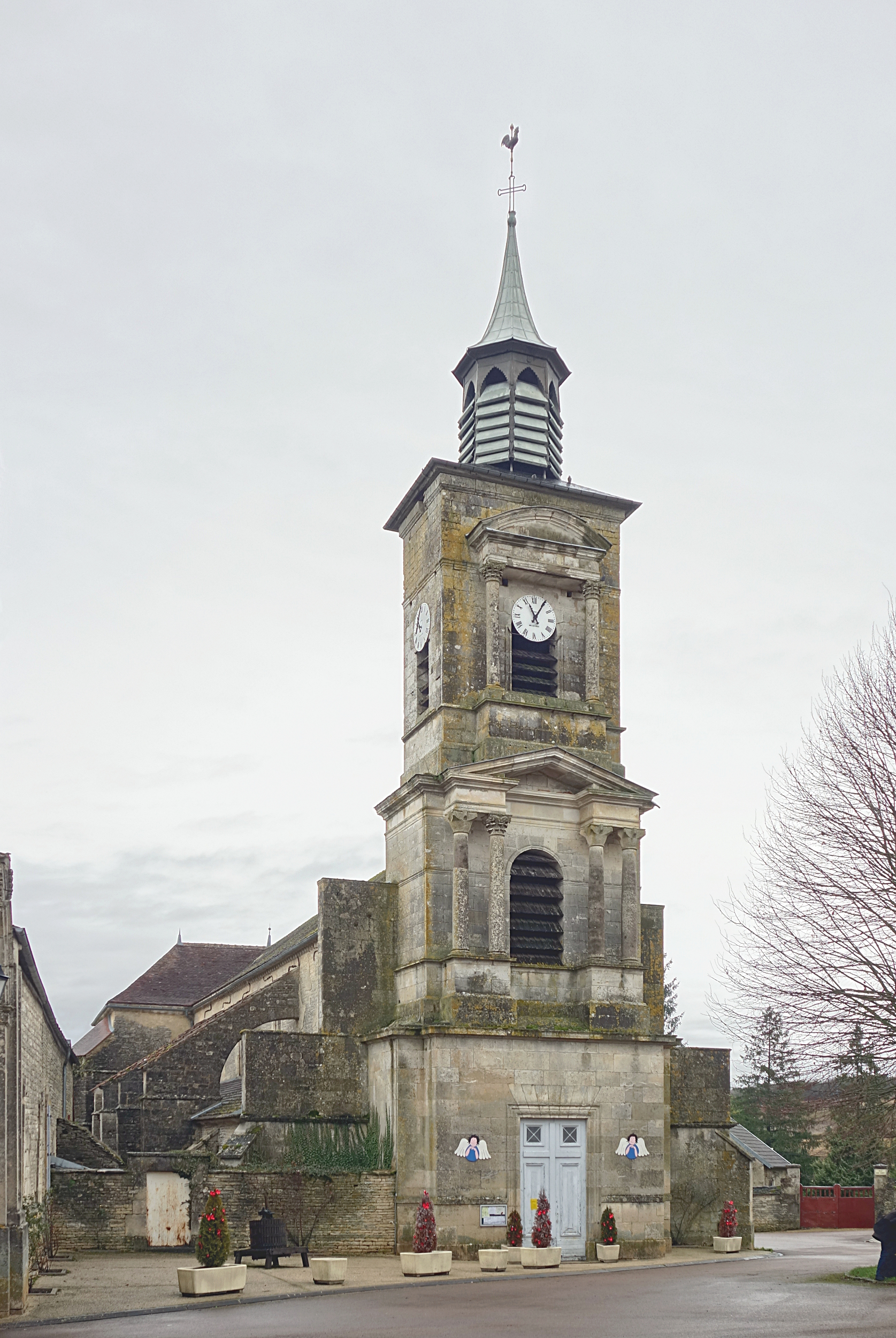
- The church in Molesme

- Coat of arms
- Location of Molesme
- Location within France Location within Bourgogne-Franche-Comté
- Coordinates: 47°56′08″N 4°21′28″E
- Country: France
- Region: Bourgogne-Franche-Comté
- Department: Côte-d'Or
- Arrondissement: Montbard
- Canton: Châtillon-sur-Seine

Government
  - Mayor (2020–2026): Jacques Lazzarotti
- Area^{1}: 28.42 km^{2} (10.97 sq mi)
- Highest elevation: 353 m (1,158 ft)
- Lowest elevation: 181 m (594 ft)
- Population (2023): 278
  - Density: 9.78/km^{2} (25.3/sq mi)
- Time zone: UTC+01:00 (CET)
  - Summer (DST): UTC+02:00 (CEST)
- INSEE/Postal code: 21419 /21330
- ^{1} French Land Register data, which excludes lakes, ponds, glaciers > 1 km^{2} (0.386 sq mi or 247 acres) and river estuaries.

Molesme (French pronunciation: [mɔlɛm], before 1997: Molesmes) is a commune in the Côte-d'Or department in eastern France.

== History ==
Molesme grew up round the Benedictine monastery of Molesme Abbey, established here in the late 11th century by Saint Robert, who later founded Cîteaux Abbey, motherhouse of the Cistercian Order, with a group of monks from Molesme.

== Population ==
Historical population
Year	Pop.	±% p.a.
1968	258	—
1975	258	+0.00%
1982	246	−0.68%
1990	224	−1.16%
1999	225	+0.05%
2007	225	+0.00%
2012	264	+3.25%
2017	265	+0.08%
2023	278	+0.80%
Source: INSEE

== See also ==
- Communes of the Côte-d'Or department
