= Houthem, Netherlands =

Houthem
- Village
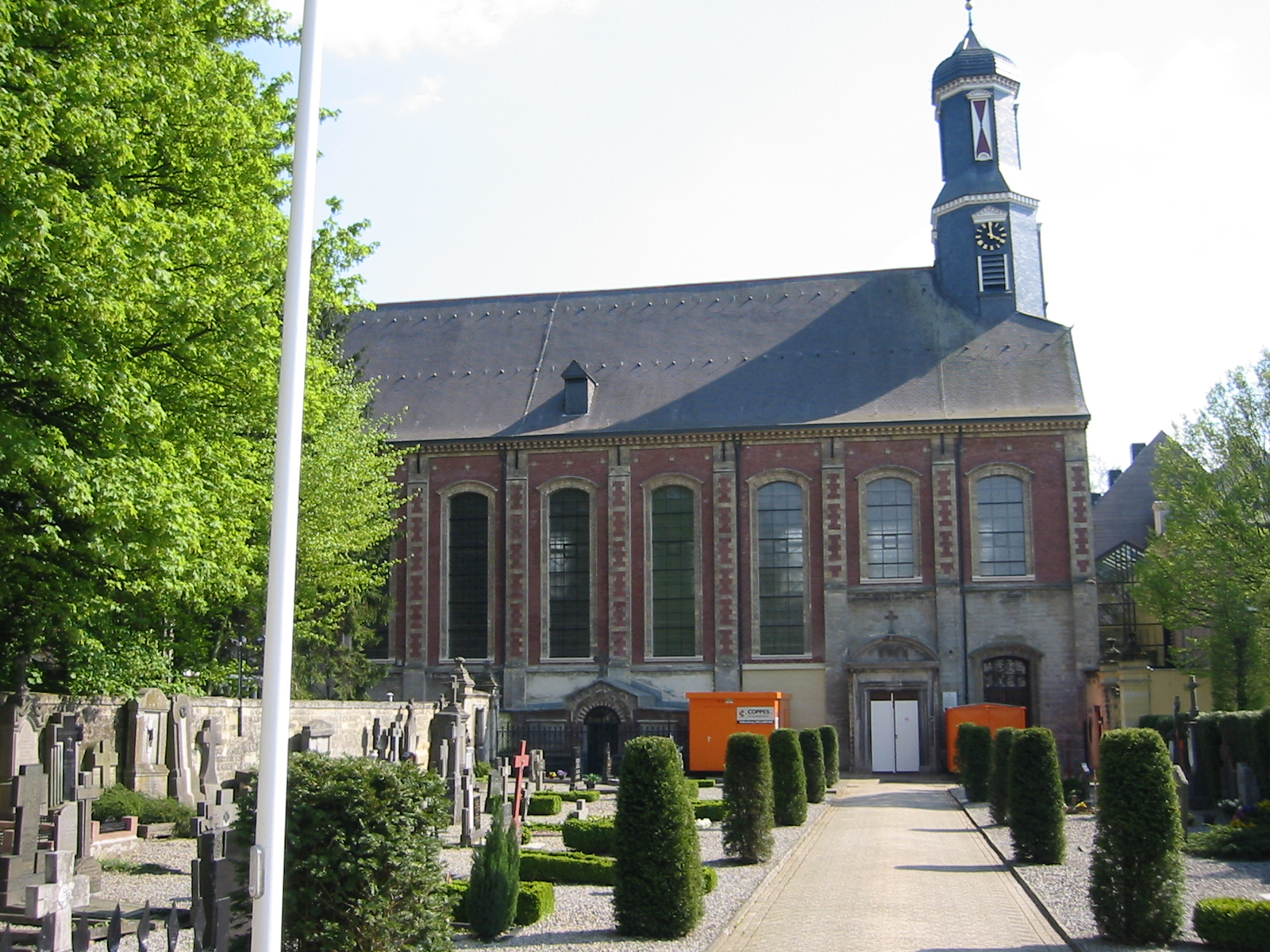
- St Gerlachus Church

- Location in the Netherlands Location in the province of Limburg in the Netherlands
- Coordinates: 50°52′N 5°48′E
- Country: Netherlands
- Province: Limburg
- Municipality: Valkenburg aan de Geul

Area
  - Total: 6.90 km^{2} (2.66 sq mi)
- Elevation: 88 m (289 ft)

Population (2021)
  - Total: 1,515
  - Density: 220/km^{2} (569/sq mi)
- Time zone: UTC+1 (CET)
  - Summer (DST): UTC+2 (CEST)
- Postal code: 6301
- Dialing code: 043
- Major roads: A79

Houthem is a village in the Dutch province of Limburg. It is a part of the municipality of Valkenburg aan de Geul, and lies about 8 km east of Maastricht.

== History ==
The village was first mentioned in 1096 as "apud Houlten", and means "settlement in a deciduous forest". Houthem is a village which developed in the Middle Ages in the valley of the Geul. Since 1232, it belonged to the Land van Valkenburg. In 1201, a Premonstratensian monastery was founded near the grave of Saint Gerlach. Between 1661 until 1785, the walled monastery was an Austrian enclave in the Dutch Republic.

The Catholic St Gerlachus Church used to be the main building of the nunnery. The church was destroyed in 1574, but 13th century elements remain. Between 1720 and 1727, the building was renovated and enlarged. In 1786, the nuns left and the building was auctioned in 1797. In 1808, part of the vault collapsed and the building was restored as a church. The church contains the tomb of Saint Gerlach.

Houthem was home to 659 people in 1840. In 1888, Houthem-Sint Gerlach railway station opened on the Aachen to Maastricht railway line.

Houthem was a separate municipality until 1940, when it was merged with Valkenburg. In 1982, it became part of the municipality of Valkenburg aan de Geul.

== Notable people ==
- Rob Delahaye (born 1959), footballer
- Jos Frissen (1892–1982), painter
- Saint Gerlach (died c. 1170), hermit
- Pauline van de Ven (born 1956), writer

== Gallery ==
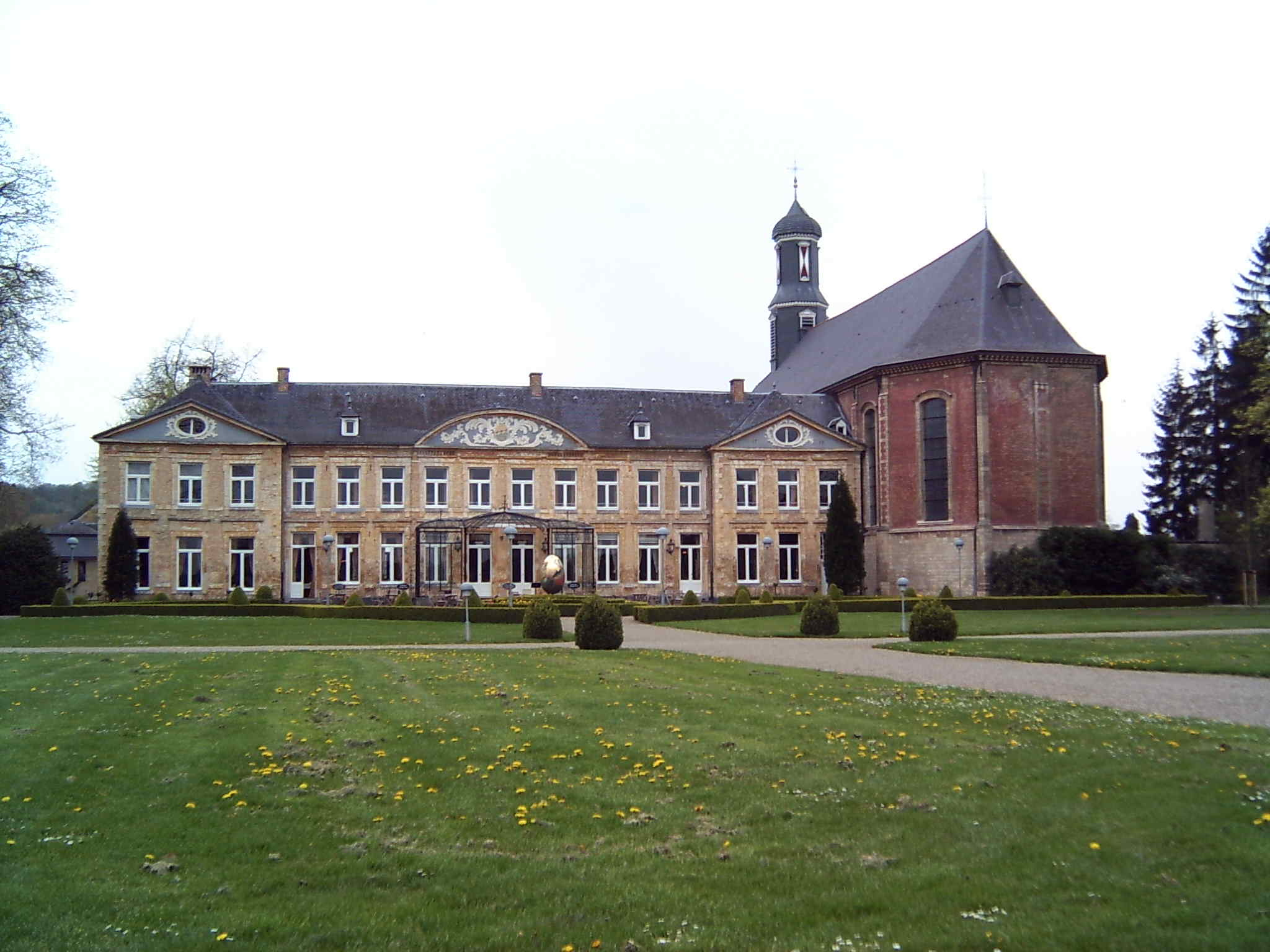
Church and castle in Houthem

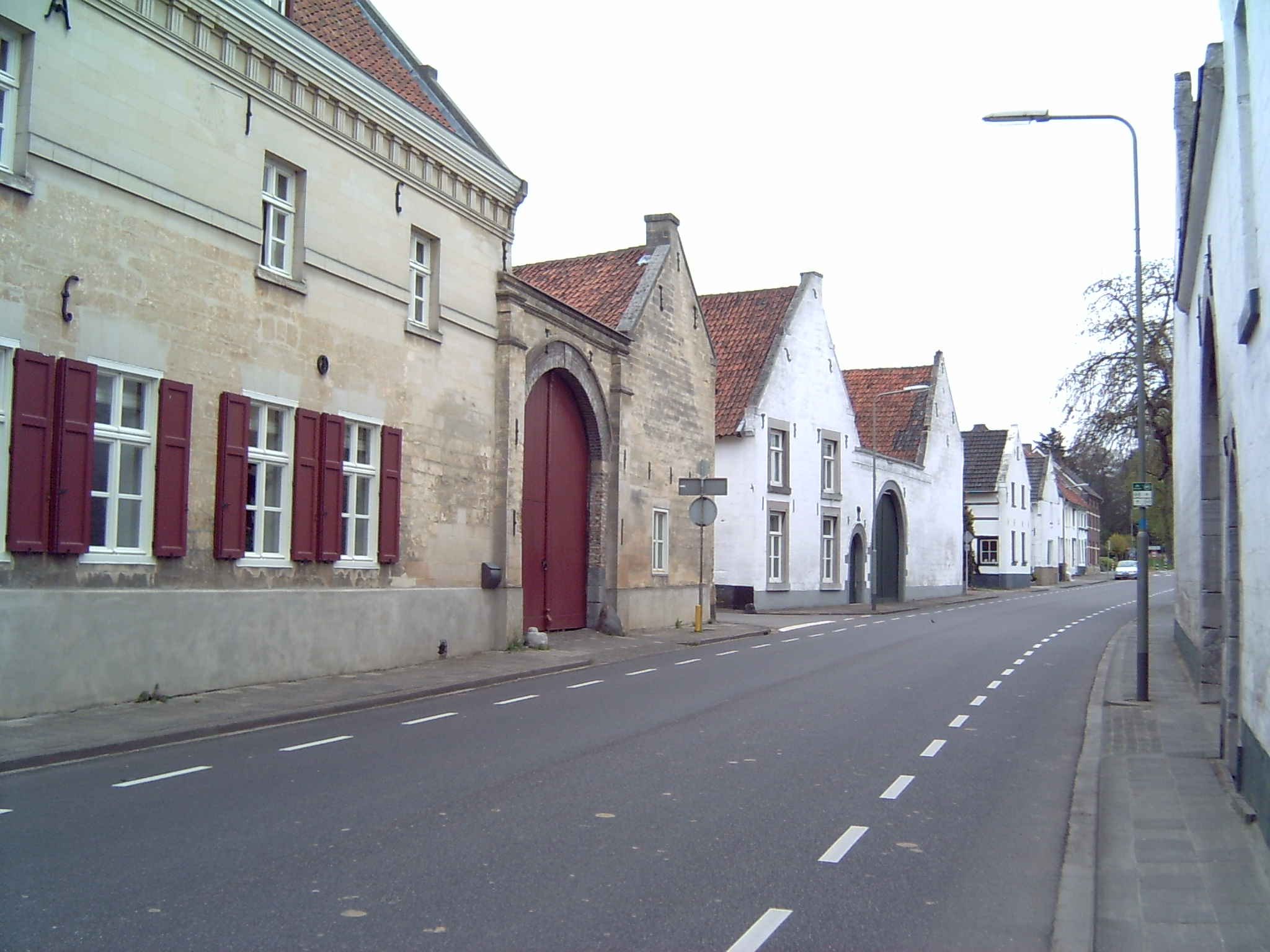
Street view

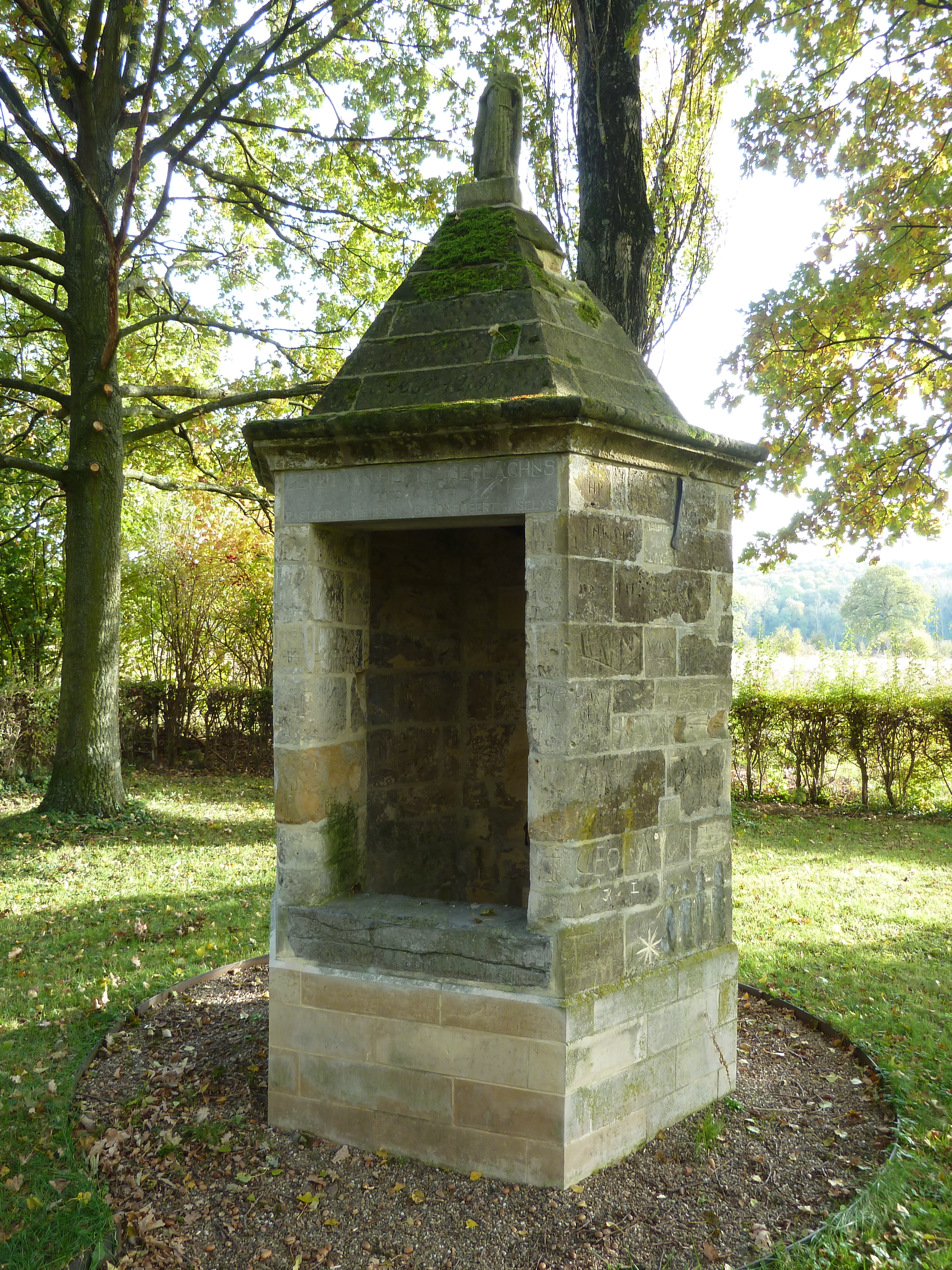
Water well

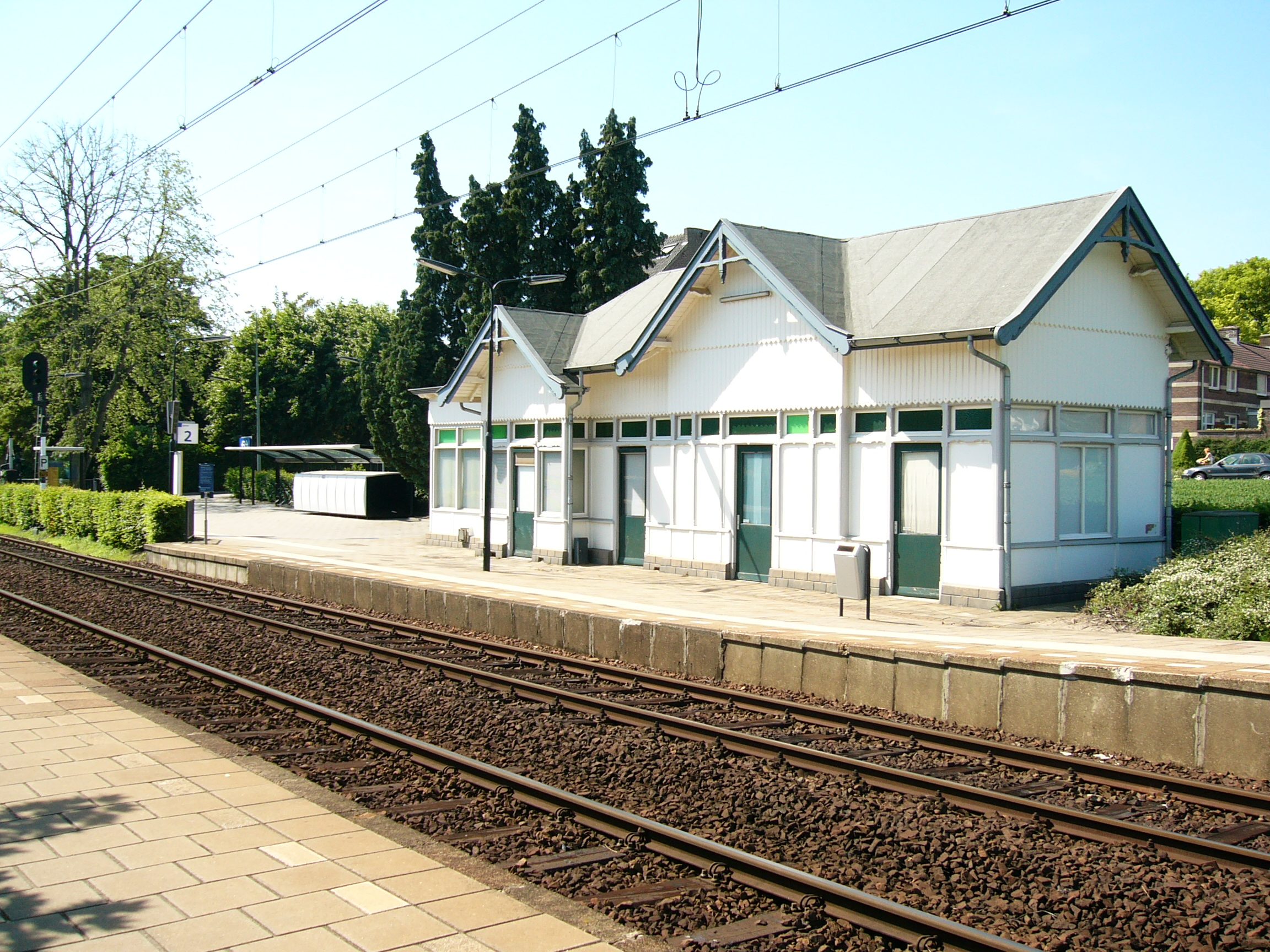
Railway station
