= Puissalicon =

- Commune
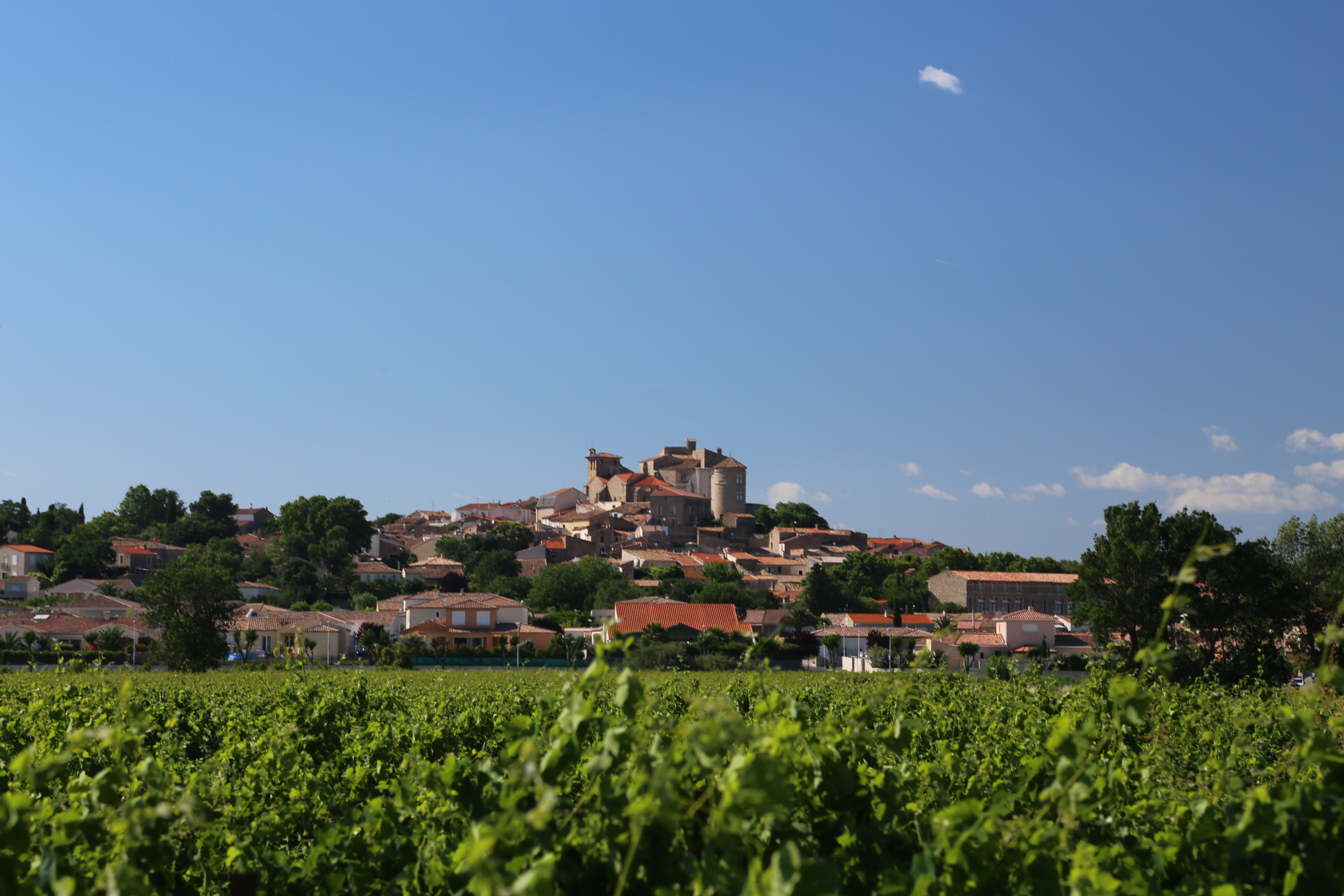
- A general view of Puissalicon

- Coat of arms
- Location of Puissalicon
- Location within France Location within Occitanie
- Coordinates: 43°27′32″N 3°14′10″E
- Country: France
- Region: Occitania
- Department: Hérault
- Arrondissement: Béziers
- Canton: Pézenas
- Intercommunality: CC Les Avant-Monts

Government
  - Mayor (2020–2026): Michel Farenc
- Area^{1}: 13.05 km^{2} (5.04 sq mi)
- Elevation: 138 m (453 ft)
- Highest elevation: 142 m (466 ft)
- Lowest elevation: 66 m (217 ft)
- Population (2023): 1,353
  - Density: 103.7/km^{2} (268.5/sq mi)
- Time zone: UTC+01:00 (CET)
  - Summer (DST): UTC+02:00 (CEST)
- INSEE/Postal code: 34224 /34480
- ^{1} French Land Register data, which excludes lakes, ponds, glaciers > 1 km^{2} (0.386 sq mi or 247 acres) and river estuaries.

Puissalicon (French pronunciation: [pɥisalikɔ̃]; Languedocien: Puèg-ericon) is a commune in the Hérault department in the Occitanie region in southern France.

== Population ==
Historical population
Year	Pop.	±% p.a.
1968	788	—
1975	658	−2.54%
1982	810	+3.01%
1990	802	−0.12%
1999	911	+1.43%
2007	1,026	+1.50%
2012	1,228	+3.66%
2017	1,353	+1.96%
2023	1,353	+0.00%
Source: INSEE

== See also ==
- Communes of the Hérault department
