= Origin of coats of arms =

History of an emblematic system

Vermandois coat of arms, the oldest known, circa 1115, adopted for a county that had been ruled by the last Carolingians.

The origin of coats of arms is the invention, in medieval western Europe, of the emblematic system based on the blazon, which is described and studied by heraldry.

Emblems were used in ancient history and during the earlier Middle Ages. However, it was not until the 12th century, between 1120 and 1160, that coats of arms first appeared.

The origin of coats of arms can be traced mainly through the study of seals. Seals go from depicting a few coats of arms on a rider's gonfanon to equestrian seals bearing coats of arms on the shield. One theory assumes that this innovation emerged simultaneously in different parts of Europe. Another distinguishes two specific areas of origin: southern England and the borders of Vermandois and Champagne in northern France.

The Plantagenet enamel, often dated 1160-1165, which shows the coat of arms of Geoffrey Plantagenet, Count of Anjou, is the earliest known heraldic representation in colour.

Coats of arms are an invention of the medieval West. They form a system based on the fusion of elements from signs, banners, seals, coins, and shields. Banners seem to play a key role. Coats of arms may combine individual, family and fiefdom emblems, some of which have been canting arms from the outset. Family emblems, however, which can be studied through heraldic groups, seem to be essential.

Coats of arms spread, perhaps because military equipment no longer made it possible to recognize the identity of combatants and, more certainly, thanks to the fashion for tournaments, supported by the development of aristocratic competition and the valorization of the individual. The adoption of coats of arms is correlated with a growing need for identification, which explains the appearance of hereditary surnames and more varied clothing simultaneously.

Coats of arms first appeared among the nobility in the 12th century, before spreading throughout society in the 13th century, albeit at different times depending on the country. At the same time, heraldry was born.

== Before the coat of arms ==
=== Ancient times ===
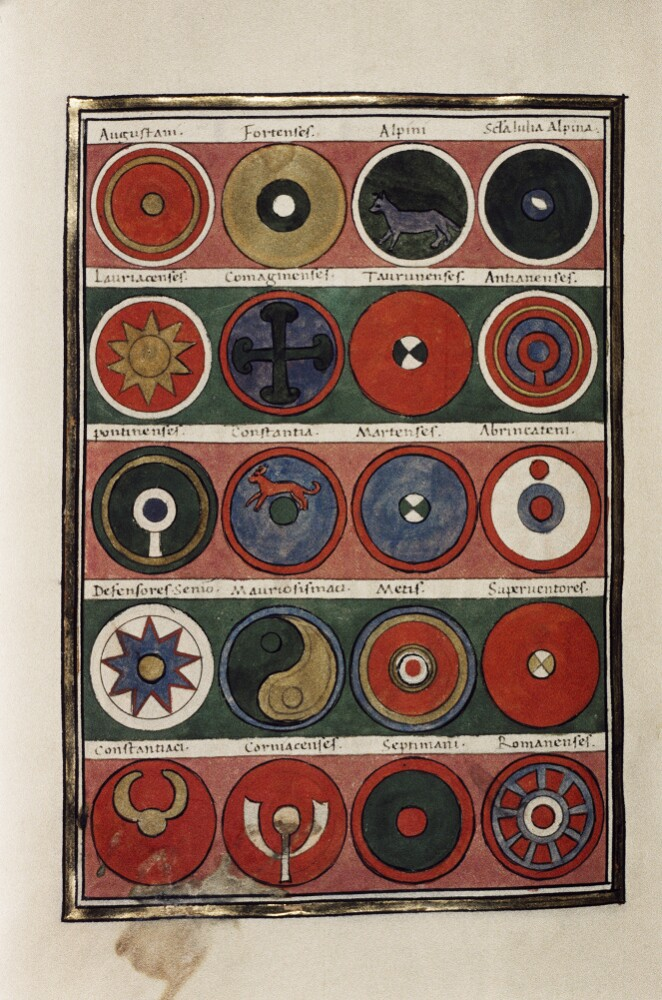
Notitia dignitatum, Magister peditum 6, shields from the legions stationed at Osimi (Brest). Bodleian Library, Oxford

In ancient times, the Greeks used collective emblems found on official documents such as coins, seals, and terracotta stamps. They also used individual or family emblems, quoted in literary texts or depicted on vases. These are various images (letters, attributes of a divinity, animal, etc.). These emblems do not constitute a system, and their representation obeys no precise rules.

Under the Roman Republic, the great families (gens) used a hereditary emblem, depicted on the reverse of coins minted by magistrates. At first, Roman armies had ensigns representing various animals. With the reform of Marius in 107 BC, the eagle became a general military emblem. Later, under the Roman Empire, each legion, in addition to the imperial eagle, also used a particular ensign, be it an object, an animal or a representation of a god.

It is not known how much credence to give to the drawings in the Notitia dignitatum, which depict the shields of the legions of the Late Roman Empire, and which are known from copies made in the 15th century.

=== Middle Ages to early 11th century ===
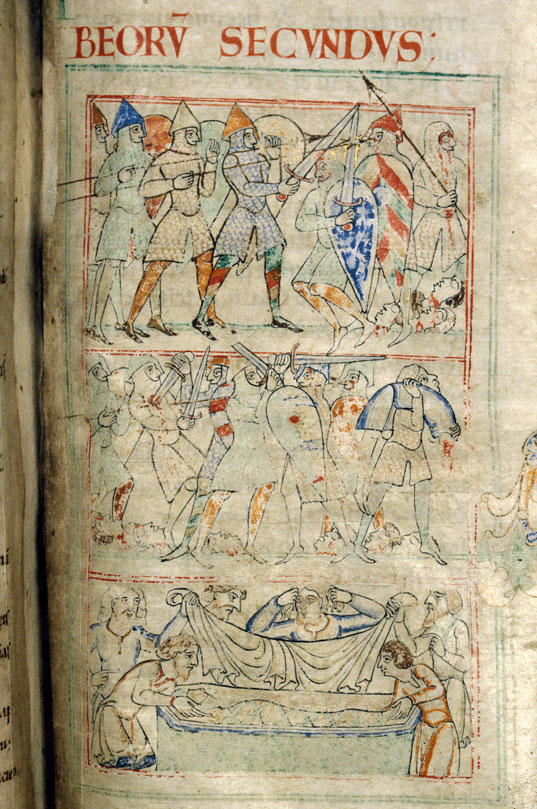
Harding Bible: battle of Beerzeth, death and burial of Judas Maccabaeus (Dijon municipal library)

The emblems used during the earlier Middle Ages, mainly studied by German historians such as Percy Ernst Schramm, are poorly known and their influence on the birth of coats of arms is debated. Charlemagne wore an unadorned shield but had his emblem, an eagle, placed above his palace of Aachen.

In the 11th century, figures and colours were painted on shields, without any particular system, since according to the chronicler William of Poitiers, the Duke of Normandy William the Conqueror and the Count of Anjou Geoffrey II (Geoffrey Martel), before a battle in 1049, took care to recognize the colours of clothing and the decoration of shields. Coats of arms did not yet exist at the time the Bayeux tapestry was embroidered, in the last third of the 11th century, since the figures depicted on combatants' shields vary for the same character, and, conversely, some use the same shields. Nor are the emblems used on the coats of arms in the 11th century consistent. (Note: Nieus (2017, pp. 120–125))

Similarly, the shields depicted anachronistically in the miniatures of the Cîteaux Bible, or Harding Bible, which dates from 1109, do not yet include real coats of arms. However, they are much closer than the Bayeux tapestry designs. The Cîteaux Bible contains heraldic partitions and ordinaries: the pale and party per pale, the chevron and counter-chevron, the bend and party per bend, the fess, and gyronny, (Note: Nieus (2017, pp. 112–120.)) although the rules of blazon are not respected. This bible was produced during the abbacy of Stephen Harding, of English origin, and the drawings could be traces of memories of actual shields of Anglo-Norman or Northern French lords.

== The first coats of arms in the 12th century ==
=== Armorial objects and literature ===
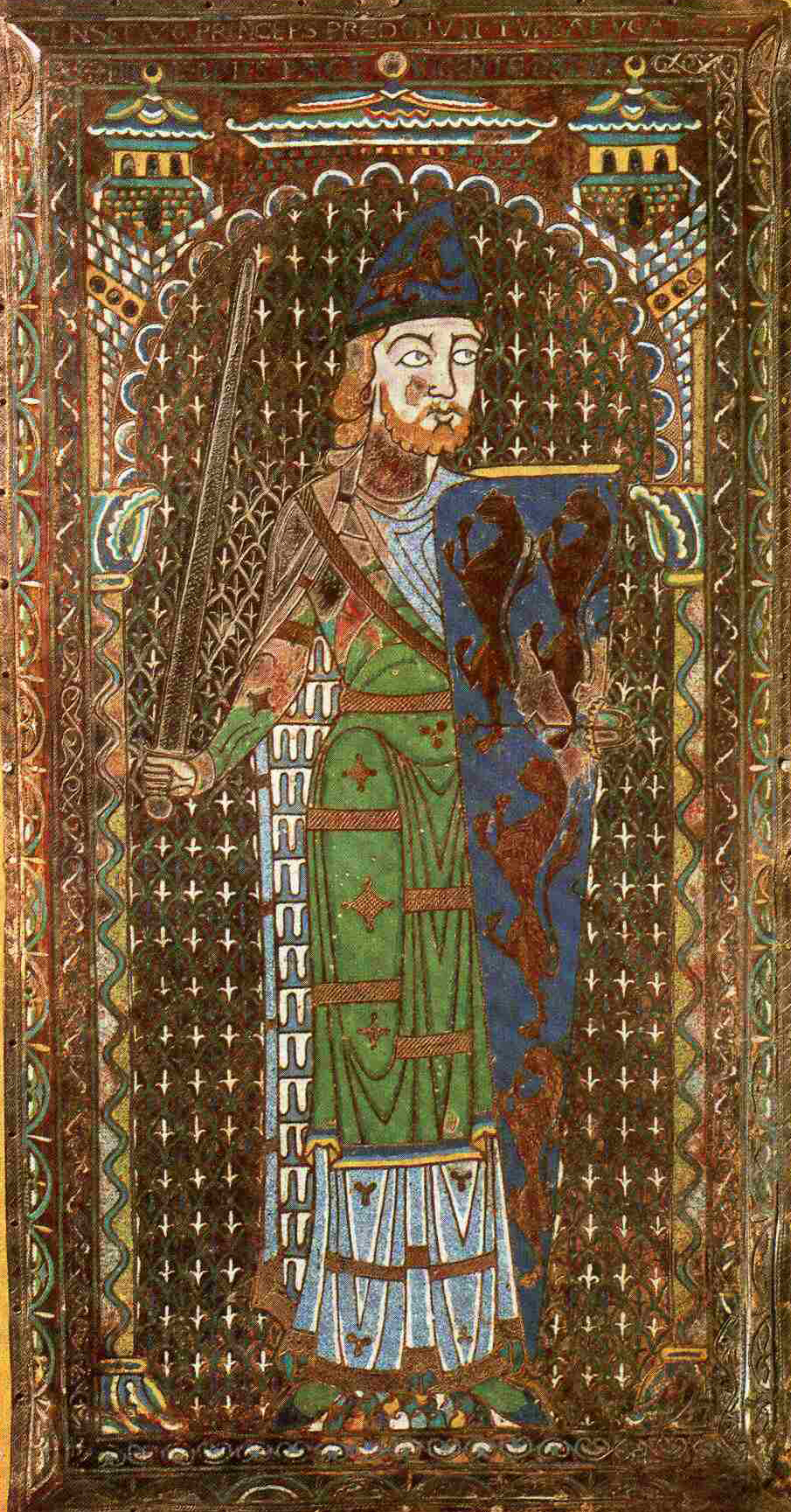
Plantagenet enamel. Enamelled funeral plaque of Geoffrey Plantagenet, Count of Anjou (Le Mans Museum of Archaeology and History)

As early as the 14th century, Jacques de Hemricourt, in Le Miroir des nobles de Hesbaye, asserts that coats of arms originated in the 11th century. In the 19th century, Anatole de Barthélemy dates the appearance of the feudal coat of arms "only to the last third of the 11th century". In 1958, Robert Viel postulated a continuity between the emblems used in antiquity, the designs of the Bayeux tapestry, and coats of arms, the latter emerging from Geoffrey Plantagenet's enamel during a phase of diversification following a tightening of the number of figures used.

The enamelled funeral plaque of Geoffrey Plantagenet, Count of Anjou, features what appear to be a real coat of arms, azure (blue) with six golden lions. Since Louis Bouly de Lesdain, this has often been considered the oldest known coat of arms, granted to Geoffrey Plantagenet when he was knighted in 1127 by his father-in-law Henry I, King of England. Until Michel Pastoureau's studies, this was the date often chosen for the origin of coats of arms. Pastoureau however showed that the enamel depicting Geoffrey Plantagenet seems to have been produced around 1160–1165, and the account of his knighting, which mentions the shield with the six lioncels (an obsolete term for lions when there is more than one on a shield), was written by Jean Rapicault, a monk from Marmoutier Abbey, around 1170–1175, while his only surviving seal, dated 1149, has no coat of arms. It is therefore likely that Jean Rapicault projected for 1127 a representation typical of his era, the 1170s.

Consequently, it is more accurate to consider this funerary enamel to be, in the words of Laurent Hablot, "the earliest known evidence of heraldic representation in colour". Furthermore, even if this work is dated to the 1150s, it reflects the Anglo-Norman influence on the Counts of Anjou, reinforcing the geographical origin of heraldry demonstrated by the seals. This is a case where the husband, Geoffrey Plantagenet, adopts the family emblem of his wife, Empress Matilda, a prestigious king's daughter, to claim his inheritance. (Note: Nieus (2017, pp. 126–136))

Although the vocabulary of the chansons de geste can be examined, narrative sources are of little help in studying the precise process by which coats of arms were born. The texts available are symbolic constructs in which references to decorations, while confirming the iconographic sources, do not make it possible to delve much deeper. Nevertheless, the Roman de Rou can be cited, which, around 1160, calls them "connoissances".

Mult veissiez par les grant plaignes

moveir conreiz et chevtaignes;

ni a riche home ne a baron

qui n'ait ez lui son gonfanon,

ou sa maisnie se restreigne,

connoissances e entresainz,

de plusieurs guises escuz painz.

In modern French:

Vous verriez par les grandes plaines,

accourir de nombreux groupes armés et compagnies

où il n'y a pas de riche homme ni de baron

qui n'ait près de lui son gonfanon

autour duquel sa troupe se rassemble

avec leurs emblèmes personnels et signes communs

dont leurs écus sont peints de plusieurs manières.

In English:

You would see across the great plains

numerous armed groups and companies

where there is no rich man or baron

who does not have his gonfanon by his side

around which his troop gathers

with their personal emblems and common signs

with their shields painted in various ways.

=== The appearance of coats of arms on seals ===
The best sources for dating the appearance of coats of arms are seals. However, these are only default sources, small and monochrome, which are used for lack of anything better, because other objects bearing coats of arms, often in colour (banners, garments, frescoes, painted or engraved objects and utensils, weapons, etc.) have almost all disappeared due to the fragility of their materials. The diffusion of seals predates that of coats of arms. (Note: Hablot (2019, pp. 143–148))

The first emblematic signs appeared on seals around 1120–1150, first on the gonfanon, then on the shield. Jean-François Nieus counts seventeen armorial seals up to 1150 and thirty-three up to 1160, using as a criterion the hereditary nature of the proto-heraldic emblem, i.e. its use by the descendants of the lord concerned.

==== Armorial seals on the gonfanon ====
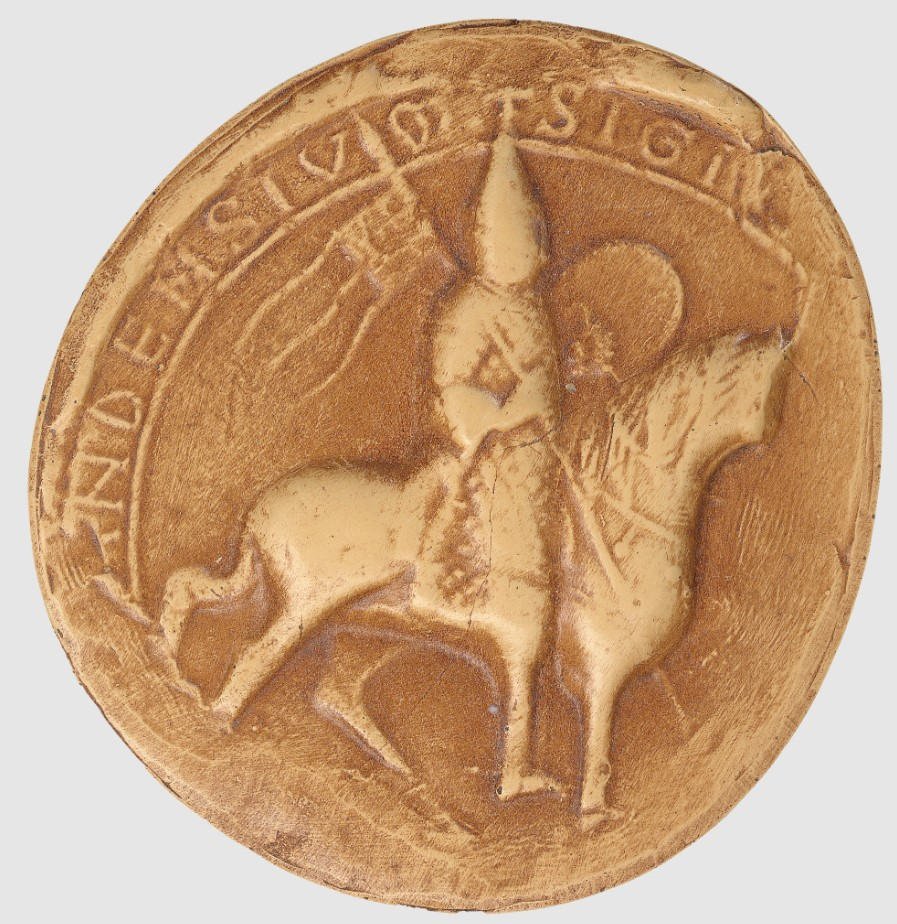
The Vermandois chequers on the gonfanon. Seal of Ralph I, Count of Vermandois, circa 1110/1120, proven use in 1126

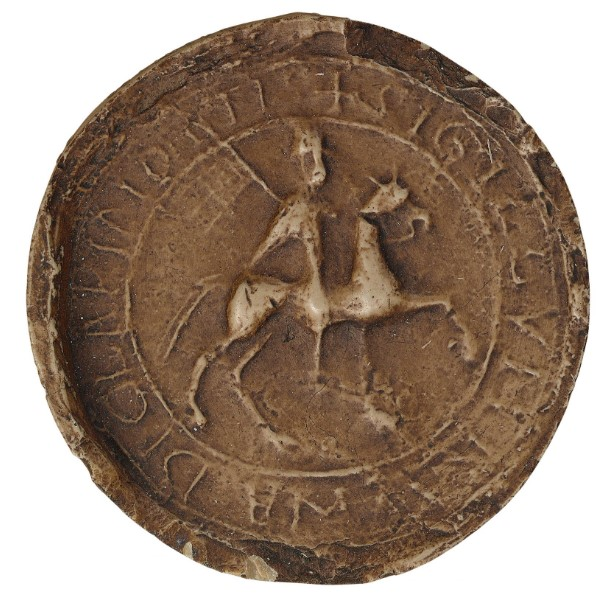
The Vermandois chequers on the gonfanon. Seal of Renaud II de Clermont, circa 1105/1120, used in 1130/1150. (Note: Nieus (2017, pp. 100–106.)) Archives nationales, casts from the Douët d'Arcq collection 1010 and 1041.

Pastoureau proposes a chronology in three sequences. Firstly, around 1120-1130, some equestrian seals of great nobles, such as William I, Count of Luxembourg, show a gonfanon decorated with geometric figures, the future coat of arms. However, Nieus does not include this seal in the list of early heraldic seals, because what it depicts corresponds rather to the flames of the rider's lance pennons.

The first seal bearing a coat of arms is apparently that of Ralph I, Count of Vermandois, which could date from around 1110/1120 or 1126, or even 1130/1135. Nieus also uses the seal of Renaud II, Count of Clermont, in use around 1130/1150. Renaud II of Clermont was the second husband of Ralph I of Vermandois' mother, Adelaide, Countess of Vermandois. Both seals bear a chequered shield, the Vermandois chequers, on the gonfanon, his marriage enabling Renaud II to display this emblem. They would thus be the first two proto-heraldic seals. Nieus conjectures that, given the political context, these seals could have been used as early as 1110/1120, while Pastoureau and Nicolas Civel doubt that they were genuine coats of arms.

==== Armorial seals in the field ====
In addition to equestrian seals, some seals do not depict a rider but have the field invaded by the heraldic emblem, such as those of Richard de Lucy (the emblem is a pike) and Rohese de Clare (the emblem is a chevron), niece of Gilbert de Clare, 1st Earl of Pembroke, and wife of Gilbert de Gant, Earl of Lincoln.

For Pastoureau, this type of seal represents a second stage, dating from around 1130–1140, between the equestrian seals with gonfanons and the equestrian seals emblazoned on the shield. Nieus lists other seals of this type, belonging to Hugh III, Count of Saint-Pol, bearing a sheaf of oats in the field and dating from 1127/1129, Hugh I of Rodez (an eagle, 1140), Baldwin de Redvers, 1st Earl of Devon (a griffin, before 1144), Robert, 1st Earl of Gloucester (died 1147; a lion passant), Ebles de Mauléon (a lion rampant, c. 1130/1149).

Seals where the emblem is in the field

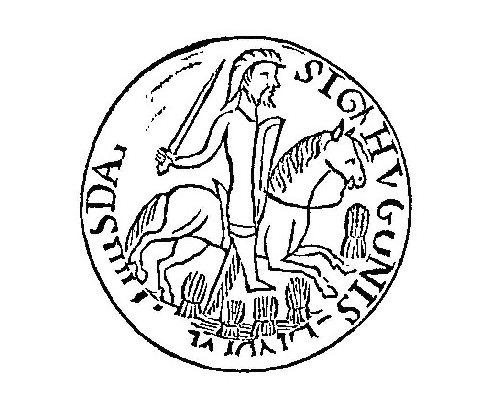
Seal of Hugh III, Count of Saint-Pol, circa 1127/1129. Engraving published in 1788.

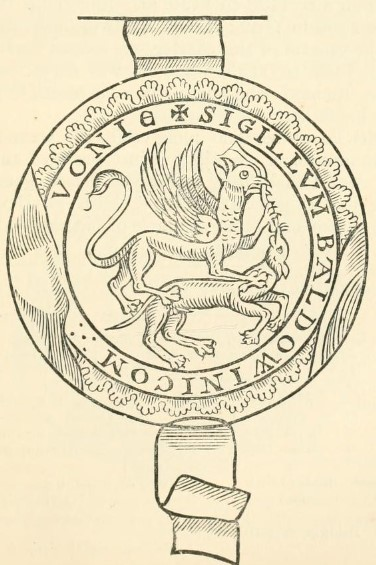
Seal of Baldwin de Redvers, 1st Earl of Devon. Proven use in 1143/1144. Drawing published in 1874.

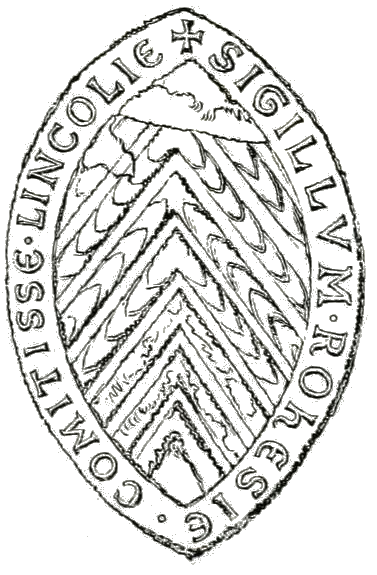
Seal of Rohese (Rohesia) de Clare, wife of Gilbert de Gant, Earl of Lincoln. Probably engraved in 1156. Drawing published in 1846.

==== Armorial equestrian seals ====
Finally, around 1140–1160, several high-ranking personalities had armorial equestrian seals. The earliest seal to feature an armorial shield borne by the rider may be that of Waleran de Beaumont, Count of Meulan and Earl of Worcester, but its dating (1136–1138) is uncertain according to Pastoureau, and is contradicted by a later seal of the same personage without a coat of arms on the shield. Adrian Ailes and Jean-François Nieus, on the other hand, have identified two armorial equestrian seals of Waleran de Beaumont, one from 1137/1139, the other from 1139/1140, both showing a chequered shield. Nieus adds other armorial seals also dating from 1130–1150: the seals of Enguerrand II de Coucy, Bouchard de Guise, Hugues Cholet de Roucy, Yves de Nesle, Count of Soissons, Gilbert de Clare, 1st Earl of Pembroke, and his nephew Gilbert de Clare, 1st Earl of Hertford, a second seal of Ralph I, Count of Vermandois and another of Ramon Berenguer IV, Count of Barcelona. The latter is dated 1150 by Bouly de Lesdain. For Pastoureau, the second seal of Ralph I de Vermandois is the oldest armorial equestrian seal dated (1146).

Examples of early armorial horse seals

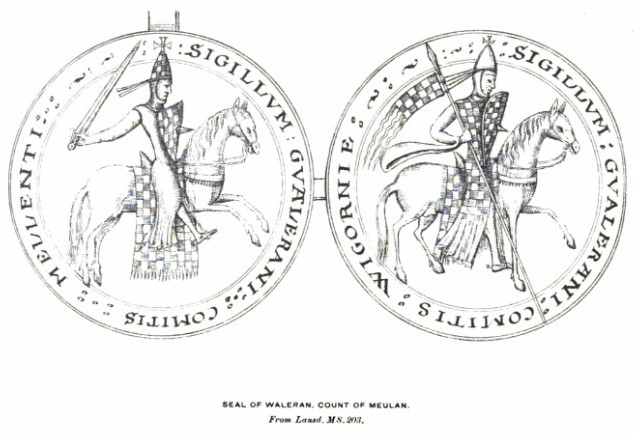
Double-sided seal of Waleran de Beaumont, 1st Earl of Worcester, otherwise Waleran de Meulan. Proven use in 1139/1140. Drawing published in 1894.

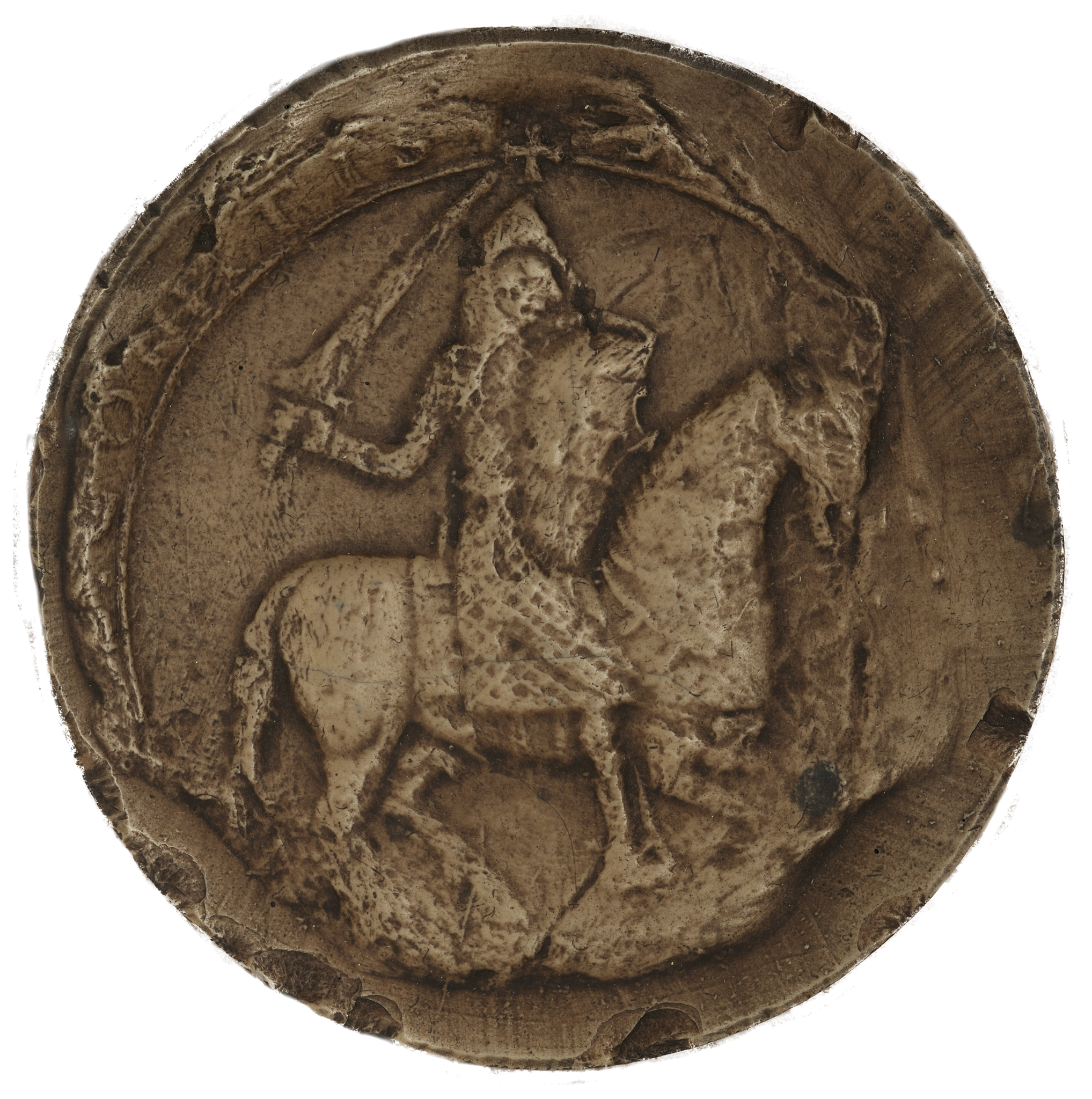
Seal of Yves de Nesle, Count of Soissons. Proven use in 1146. Archives départementales de la Somme, moul., Sc/Picardie 38 collection.

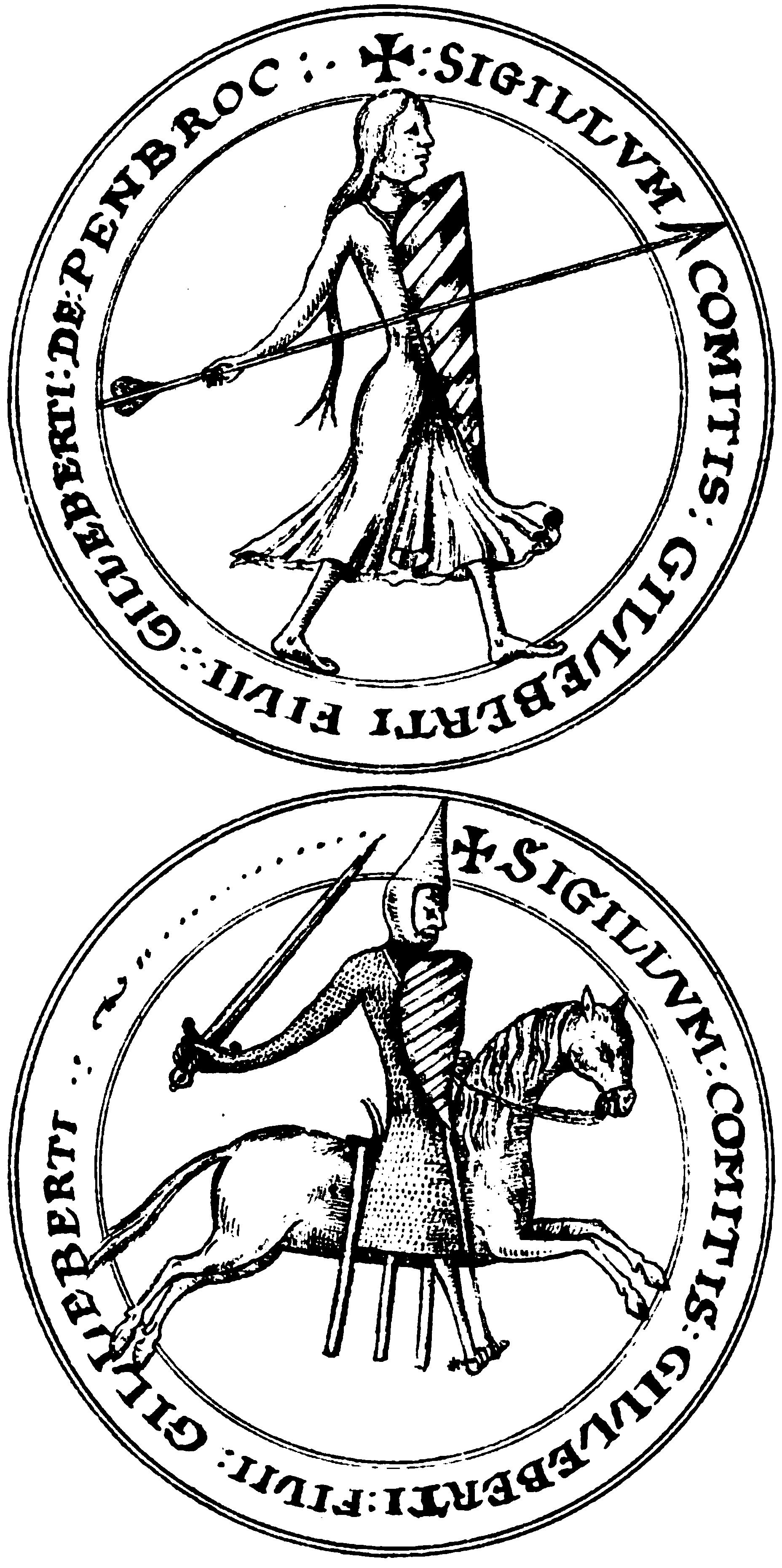
Two-sided seal of Gilbert de Clare, Earl of Pembroke. Proven use in 1146/48. 17th-century drawing published in 1894.

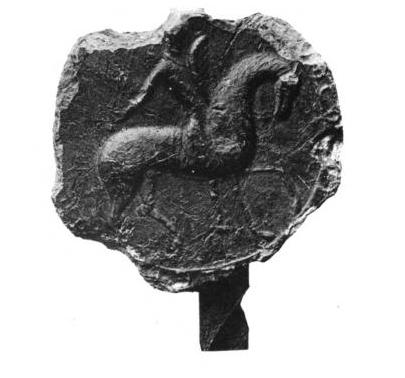
Seal of Gilbert de Clare, Earl of Hertford. Proven use in 1146/48. Photograph published in 1894.

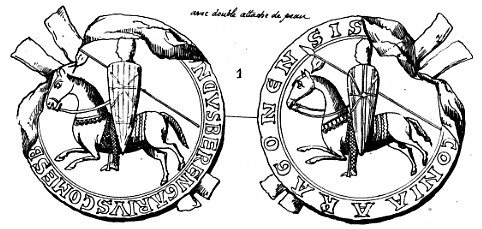
Double-sided seal of Ramon Berenguer IV, Count of Barcelona. Proven use in 1150. May date from 1144/46. Drawing by Joseph Laugier published in 1860.

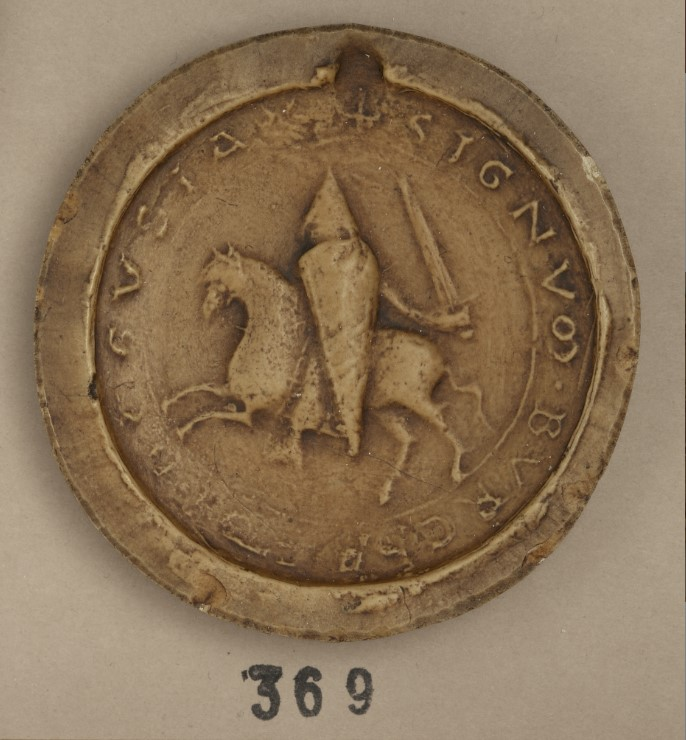
Seal of Bouchard de Guise. Evidenced in 1155, but may date from 1130/1140. Archives nationales, moulage collection Sc/Picardie 369.

It seems that Waleran de Meulan's seal shows not only a shield bearing a coat of arms but also an armorial saddlecloth. This marks the beginning of a process of heraldically decorating the horse itself. The first equestrian seals, depicting the rider riding to the right and holding his shield to his left, logically show only the inside of the shield. In order to depict an armorial shield, the engravers rotate it slightly and show half of it. It was only later that the knight's arm was twisted so that the viewer could see the whole shield.

=== Geographical origin of the coat of arms ===
According to Pastoureau and, following him, Civel, coats of arms appeared throughout Western Europe between 1120 and 1160 and spread more rapidly to England and the regions between the Loire and the Rhine. Thus, coats of arms were invented concomitantly in different regions of the West, without it being necessary to postulate, despite appearances, an earlier chronology in the region between the Seine and the Rhine. (Note: Pastoureau (2003, pp. 298–310.))

Geographical distribution of early coats-of-arms attested up to 1160 (Note: Nieus (2017, pp. 106–111.))

On the contrary, German historian Lutz Fenske describes a clear precedence for France and England in the appearance of coats of arms. Nieus suggests that the process should be shifted slightly, starting earlier, around 1000-1110. Above all, he distinguishes two geographical foci where coats of arms originated. The first is southern England, where the de Clare and de Beaumont families, allies of King Stephen, and their enemies Robert, 1st Earl of Gloucester (a griffin, before 1144), Robert, 1st Earl of Gloucester, and Baldwin de Redvers, 1st Earl of Devon, who were on the side of Matilda the Empress and her son Henry II Plantagenet, adopted armorial seals. The second focus is in northern France, more precisely on the borders of Vermandois and Champagne. The users of armorial seals on both sides of the English Channel were related lords: Ralph I, Count of Vermandois, was the maternal uncle of Waleran, Count of Meulan, also known as Waleran de Beaumont, 1st Earl of Worcester, while Renaud II, Count of Clermont, was also the maternal uncle of Gilbert de Clare, 1st Earl of Hertford.

By the 1130s, the use of the seal had already begun among Anglo-Norman lords, and spread from Brittany to Flanders in the first half of the 11th century. In this vast area, where the seal became commonplace even among average lords, the choice to decorate seals with coats of arms was a particular feature of these two areas of southern England and the confines of Vermandois. In the neighbouring region of Île-de-France, for example, the general use of the seal was a given, but its massive decoration with coats of arms only arrived at the end of the 12th century.

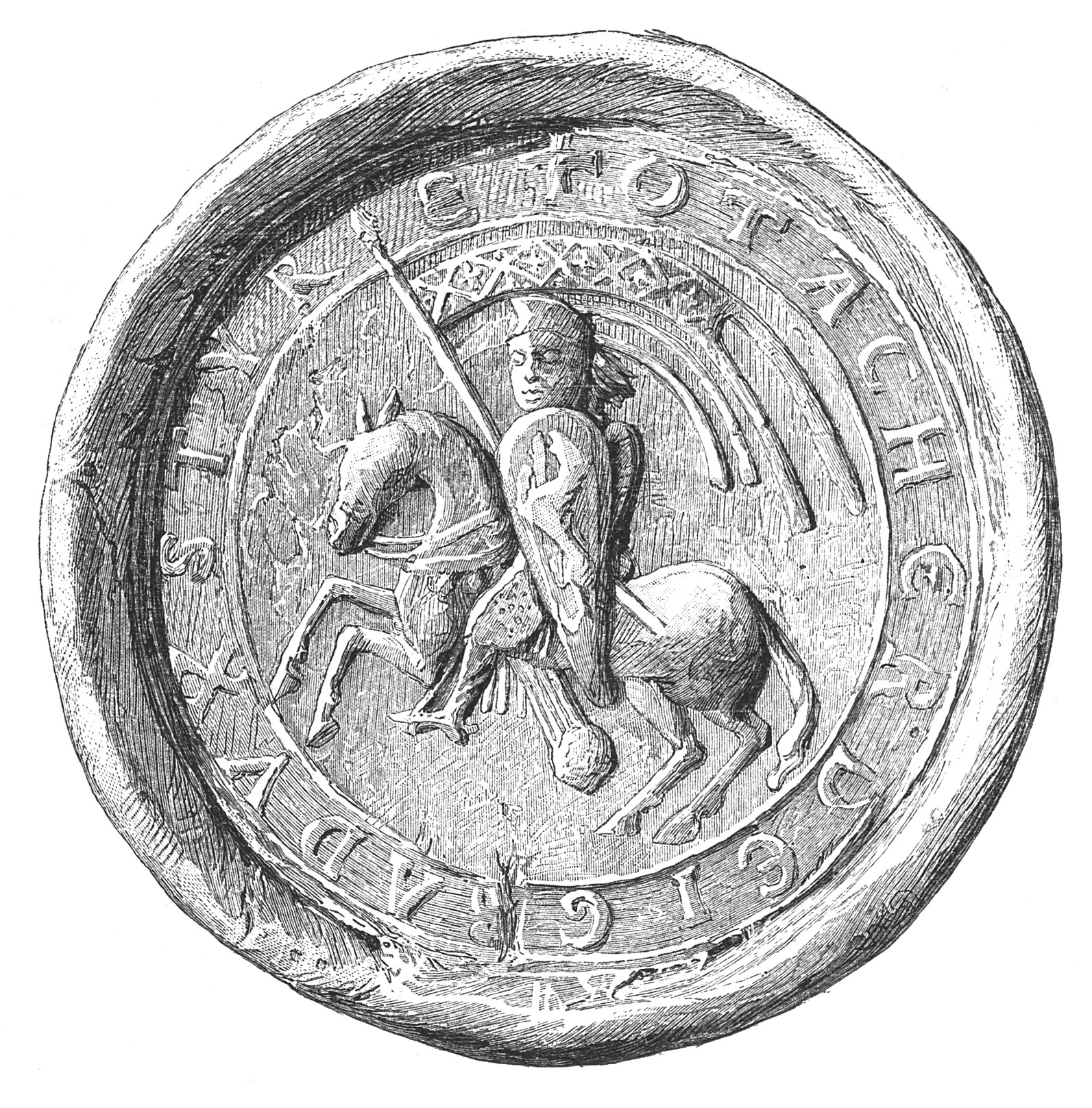
Seal of Ottokar III of Styria. Drawing published in 1891.

From the 1140s, the coat-of-arms seal spread geographically throughout southern Europe. Around 1155, Raymond V of Toulouse imitated his enemy Ramon Berenguer IV, Count of Barcelona, and had the Toulouse cross engraved on his seals and coins. In Italy and Central Europe, also in the 1150s, Welf VI, Duke of Spoleto and Marquis of Tuscany, Henry II Jasomirgott, Duke of Austria, and Ottokar III of Styria adopted seals with armorial shields. In the Kingdom of León, the choice of the lion as emblem (canting arms) on the coins of Alfonso VII from 1134 onwards, then on the charters of his son Ferdinand II of León, also shows the success of this fashionable heraldic figure.

Finally, it would appear that the group of great Anglo-Norman and Picard lords who initiated the use of armorial seals launched a European trend, which spread through tournaments, the Second Crusade and Reconquista expeditions to Spain.

In the Holy Roman Empire, Saxony, Thuringia and Brandenburg, special coins called bracteates bear the effigy of the issuing prince, with shield and gonfanon. The decoration of the shield does not appear to be fixed until 1160–1170, while the gonfanon appears to be stable earlier.

=== A combinatory system ===
From the second half of the 12th century onwards, coats of arms were created as a system, combining elements that had previously existed from different sources: ensigns, banners, shields, seals, and coins.

Some of the figures come from signs in the round. From banners come the colours and certain geometric constructions of the coat of arms, as well as the relationship between the coat of arms and the fief. Seals conveyed many family emblems, including "talking" figures (i.e., punning references to names of bearers), and the hereditary nature of coats of arms. The same applies to coins. The triangular shape of the coat of arms, the furs, and some geometric figures come from shields. Shields are a marker of chivalric identity, common to the first coat-of-arms bearers.

Seals also show the precedence of banners or gonfanons over shields. During the First Crusade (1095–1099), chieftains used personal banners that were recognizably monochrome (Robert Curthose's was gold, Baldwin I of Jerusalem's was white, while Bohemond I of Antioch used red). Banners seem to play a key role in the origin of coats of arms since many blazon terms come from the vocabulary of fabrics. In the seventeenth century, Du Cange was the first to understand the importance of the influence of fabrics on coats of arms. In the combination of individual signs (shields) and collective signs (the lord's banners), the latter seems to be the most important. Banners are rallying signs linked to the fiefdom, which vassals adopt to show their group affiliation. The blazon's Rule of tincture (rule of contrasting colours), which forbids the juxtaposition of metals or tinctures, seems to stem from banners, whose visibility is essential.

Banners with coats of arms could be a step between the monochrome gonfanon and the coat of arms. The latter, worn by the great lord in battle, who can no longer also carry a banner, indicates his presence, while the banner is carried beside him and his horse is dressed in a similarly armorial cover.

The choice of the shield as the preferred support for the coat of arms is explained by its symbolic importance. Too large and heavy to be used on foot, it is, like the lance and sword, one of the knight's weapons par excellence. It is also the lord's main physical protection. The coat of arms thus combines the emblem of the lordship with the body of its owner. In medieval iconography, it is positively connoted and commonly worn by defenders of the Good. It also became a symbol of peace and justice.

=== Hereditary, individual and fief emblems ===
==== A triple heritage ====
According to Pastoureau, hereditary emblems were used in certain large noble families, especially in Italy, the Holy Roman Empire, and Flanders, before coats of arms were created. They were used in the first coats of arms, but at the same time, fief coats of arms developed on banners. Seals show that many great lords used two coats of arms, either personal or fief-related. A choice was then gradually made, in favour of either one or the other, or by adopting new coats of arms.

These hereditary emblems are sometimes found in heraldic groups made up of families linked by a common ancestor. For example, the two fishes leaning against each other back-to-back are a canting family emblem, appearing on coins of the Counts of Bar as early as the 11th century, and in the coats of arms of a dozen lineages descended from Thierry II of Bar in the 13th century: the Counts of Ferrette, the Counts of Bar, the Counts of Chiny, the Counts of Clermont, the Sires of Nesle, the Sires of Gaucourt, the Counts of Montbéliard, the Counts of Salm-en-Ardenne, the Counts of Salm-en-Vosges and the Counts of Blâmont. From coins to seals and from seals to coats of arms.

Heraldic group of the ten lineages descended from Thierry I de Bar (c. 1045-1103), which have two fishes in their arms in the 13th century.

Counts of Ferrette

Counts of Bar

Counts of Chiny

Counts of Clermont-en-Beauvaisis

Lords of Nesle

Lords of Hargicourt

Counts of Montbeliard

Counts of Salm-en-Ardenne

Counts of Salm-en-Vosges

Counts of Blamont

Other family emblems include the sheaf of oats of the Candavène Counts of Saint-Pol, the falcon of the Falkensteins, (Note: Fenske (1986, pp. 103–105)) the sprig of mint of the Counts of Minzenberg and the hammer of the Counts of Hammerstein. "Talking" (canting) coats of arms have been around since the birth of the coat of arms, even if a prejudice, caused by their proliferation in modern times, makes them seem less ancient and less noble than the others. At least one-fifth of medieval coats of arms are canting arms. Emblems of fiefs also seem to have ancient origins. For example, the three torteaux (red roundels) seen on the shield of Countess Ida, Countess of Boulogne (died 1216), and her various husbands have a pre-heraldic origin, since, according to Pastoureau, they can be seen on the Bayeux tapestry, represented on the banner of Ida's ancestor, Eustace II, Count of Boulogne (died 1088). (Note: Jones (2008, p. 156.)) According to Pastoureau's analysis, coats of arms combine a triple emblematic heritage: individual, family and feudal. According to Brigitte Bedos-Rezak, the identification of the Count of Boulogne's gonfanon on the Bayeux tapestry "is not at all unanimous". Nieus also disputes it and consequently rejects the high dating of emblems subsequently used on coats of arms.

Possible origin of the coat of arms of the County of Boulogne, according to Michel Pastoureau (origin disputed).

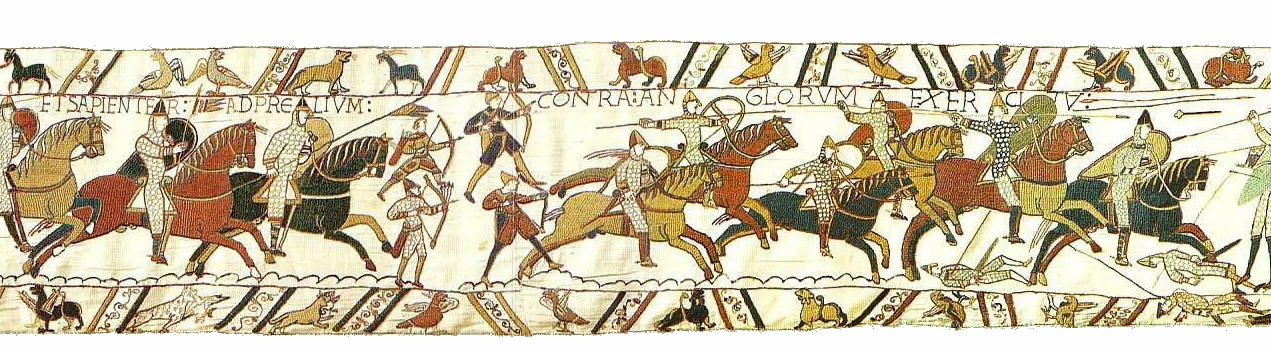
Scene 51 from the Bayeux tapestry. The horseman's spear standard at left bears three roundels.

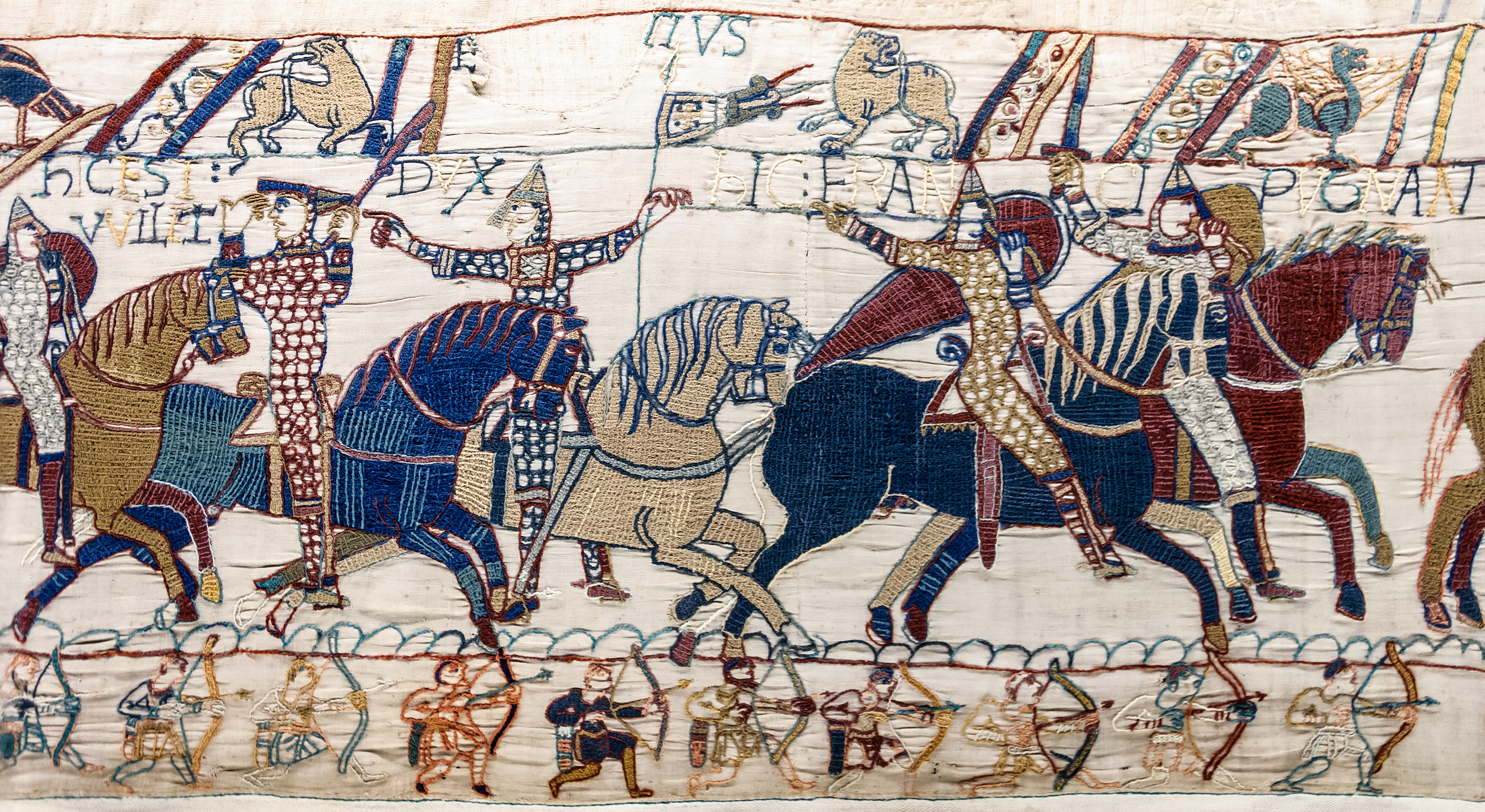
Embroidery depicting 5 armed knights riding in line. Scene 55 from the Bayeux tapestry. Eustace II, Count of Boulogne (whose name, Eustacius, seems to be partially indicated) holds a banner with roundels.

Coat of arms of the County of Boulogne, but also of the House of Courtenay, which were related by marriage.

=== Mostly family emblems ===
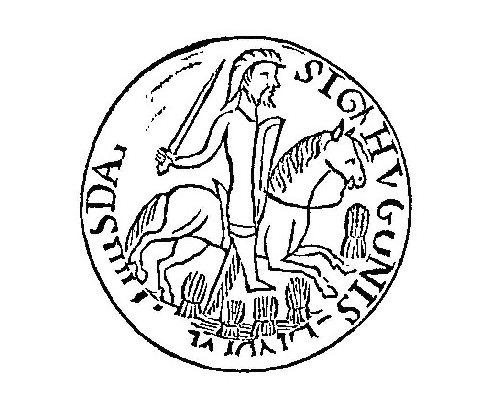
Seal of Hugh III, Count of Saint-Pol, circa 1127/1129. Engraving published in 1788

For Nieus, the distinction between individual, family, and feudal coats of arms is not supported by historical sources. Indeed, on the earliest armorial seals, the emblems appear to be familial, with two exceptions. The first is the seal of Count Hugues Cholet of Roucy, which shows a cabbage, a talking emblem inspired by the nickname "Cholet" (Latin: cauliculus, "little cabbage"). His successors kept this emblem. The second is the sheaves of oats of Hugh III, Count of Saint-Pol, expressing his nickname, "Candavène", "field of oats" in Picard. As a general rule, men do not choose their coats of arms; they are identified by them.

Nieus also disputes the early existence of coats of arms linked to a fiefdom, which did not appear, in his view, before the early thirteenth century at the earliest. According to Pastoureau, the pale of Ramon Berenguer IV, Count of Barcelona, could be a legacy of the ancient kingdom of Burgundy, which disappeared in 1032. According to Nieus, this hypothesis does not make the pale a territorial rather than a family emblem, since Ramon Berenguer IV was born of the marriage of Douce, heiress of Provence, and Ramon Berenguer III, Count of Barcelona. From Roger-Bernard I onwards, these pales were used by the Counts of Foix.

For Nieus, coats of arms are generally family coats of arms from the outset, including when the husband adopts his wife's coat of arms, which is not uncommon until the 13th century. In his opinion, the interpretation of heraldic groups, even if not unequivocal, shows the transmission of family emblems. Such is the case with the Vermandois shield, an emblem found on early seals, which passes through marriage to the families of de Beaumont, de Warenne, and de Beaugency, thus displaying pride in belonging to a lineage which, through the intermediary of Adelaide, Countess of Vermandois, wife of Hugh, Count of Vermandois, is of Carolingian descent. The Capetian House of Dreux was descended separately in the female line through the Carolingians.

Coat of arms of the Counts of Foix

Coat of arms of the Counts of Barcelona

Group of Vermandois heraldic shields worn in the 13th century by families related to Hugh I de Vermandois (1057-1101).

Counts of Vermandois, also Capetians/descendants of Henry I of France and descendants of the Carolingians in the female line.

Counts of Dreux (descendants of Louis VI of France's (Capetian) younger son Robert I)

Counts of Meulan from Beaumont family

Counts of Leicester from Beaumont family

Counts of Surrey from Warenne family

Counts of Warwick from Beaumont family

Lords of Beaugency

Another heraldic group is the chevron bearers of the de Clare family. Gilbert Strongbow's sisters spread this emblem among the Montfitchet and Monmouth lineages, while a cousin, Walter Fitz Robert of Little Dunmow, also used it. His seal shows a shield, horse cover, and saddle cloth covered with a chevron. This is a reminder of a common ancestor, Richard Fitz Gilbert, and therefore a common Norman ducal ancestry. Enguerrand II de Coucy's use of a chevron could show that both the Clare and Coucy families refer to common ancestors from the de Roucy family.

Heraldic group of the chevroned Clare family in the XIII century

De Clare family (former coat of arms).

De Clare family, Earls of Hertford and of Pembroke

Montfitchet family

Monmouth family

FitzWalter family (descendants of Walter Fitz Robert), Lords of Little Dunmow

A common origin could also explain the same use of the sheaf symbol by the Candavène counts of Saint-Pol and the counts of Clermont-en-Beauvaisis.

The House of Blois also exhibits this pattern:

House Arms

Ancient Arms

Main Arms

House of Blois-Chartres

House of Blois-Champagne

House of Blois-Navarre

House of Sancerre

House of Sully

House of Sully (after 1346)

House of Champlitte

House of Lacarre

For Nieus, the first coats of arms were therefore of family origin, but within families open to influences from the families of mothers, wives and collaterals. This openness to different contributions explains the instability of early coat-of-arms choices. Around a remarkable individual identified by an emblem, a certain number of people are linked by kinship. The link thus manifested can also extend to a chosen affinity, through vassalage or accolade.

== Why a coat of arms? ==
=== An invention of the medieval West ===
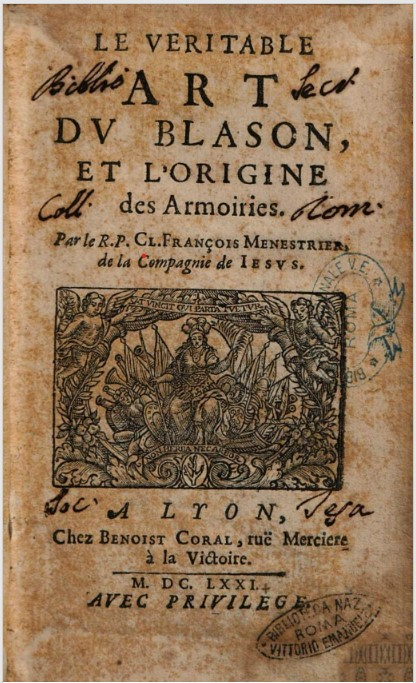
Title page of Le véritable art du blason et l'origine des armoiries, published in Lyon in 1671 by Claude-François Ménestrier

In the 17th century, Jesuit heraldist Claude-François Ménestrier laid the foundations for a systematic study of coats of arms. In 1671, in his book Le Véritable art du blason et l'origine des armoiries ("The True Art of the Coat of Arms and the Origin of Coats of Arms"), he listed over twenty hypotheses, some dating back to the Middle Ages, on the origins of coats of arms. Many of these seem outdated or unscientific today, attributing the invention of the coat of arms to Noah, King David, Alexander the Great, Julius Caesar or King Arthur.

He then proposed others. All these hypotheses are based on three types of explanation: affiliation with the emblems of antiquity, the influence of barbarian, Germanic or Scandinavian emblems, or borrowing by Westerners from Muslims during the First or Second Crusades. This last hypothesis, which has had some success, is definitively invalidated, since the adoption of practices resembling coats of arms by Muslim peoples occurred after the birth of coats of arms in the West. More precisely, the earliest Eastern coats of arms date from the 13th century, while coats of arms appeared in Western Europe in the 12th century. Similarly, the search for the origins of Western coats of arms in the Byzantine Empire has proved unconvincing, since here too the birth of emblems that can be linked to coats of arms post-dates their appearance in the West.

The reasons for the invention of coats of arms are in fact endogenous to the medieval West.

=== War, tournaments and social change ===
According to Anatole de Barthélemy, coats of arms were added to seals because equestrian seals are too similar.

==== War, an incomplete explanation ====
Many historians, including Michel Pastoureau and Adrian Ailes, have taken up a classic explanation: coats of arms appear because combatants on the battlefield are rendered unrecognizable by the hoods of their hauberks and the nasal guards of their helmets. The figures painted on shields therefore serve as a sign of recognition. The need to identify oneself on the battlefield became even more pressing with the adoption of the recumbent spear and the development of hauberks and, above all, great helms, which, from 1210–1220, became closed cylinders. Indeed, numerous accounts show how even kings and dukes had to be recognized on the battlefield by removing their helmets, for example, Edmund Ironside at the battle of Sherston in 1016 or William the Conqueror at Hastings in 1066. (Note: Jones (2008, pp. 154–155.))

Nevertheless, this explanation, based on the necessities of combat, has been called into question. On the one hand, the hauberks and helmets with nose guards are older than the general use of coats of arms; on the other hand, on the battlefield, it is the collective signs that seem essential. (Note: Fenske (1986, pp. 144–147.)) It is not certain that the face of William the Conqueror, for example, could be recognized by many of the combatants in his army at Hastings. On the other hand, where the modern observer tends to see similar defensive equipment, William the Conqueror's contemporaries could certainly see that he had a better quality hauberk. Likewise, sovereigns' helmets are recognizable by their quality, and their horses allow them to be identified. (Note: Jones (2008, pp. 160–161.))

The chief's heraldic emblems can be a rallying point for the group of subordinates, but the effectiveness of recognizing heraldic figures in the melée of battle, where group cohesion takes precedence, seems low. Long before the appearance of coats of arms, banners and battle cries were used effectively, (Note: Jones (2008, pp. 158–159.)) as well as colourful fabrics that served to maintain the bond between combatants and were identified with the sovereign himself. (Note: Jones (2008, p. 157.)) On the other hand, at the Battle of Marchfeld in 1278, although heraldry had been developed in Austria for over a century, it did not seem to be very effective. It was still necessary for each side to wear signs of recognition: in the army of Rudolf I of Habsburg, a white cross was pinned to the chest, while the fighters of Ottokar II of Bohemia wore a green cross and a band of cloth on the back.

Another explanation could be the appearance of new decorative surfaces on the knight's equipment (the pennon of the lance, the surcoat, and the shield without a shield boss). However, the shield is not the best object for identifying its bearer; it is necessary to face the wearer, and the 12th-century shield curves, rendering the entirety of its surface less visible. Moreover, the first coats of arms were not individual.

On the other hand, the need to know who one is fighting does not explain the development of the rules of blazon, and these figures become true coats of arms when they are used consistently for the same individual according to precise rules. These are the rules that underpin heraldry as an original system.

==== The role of the tournament ====
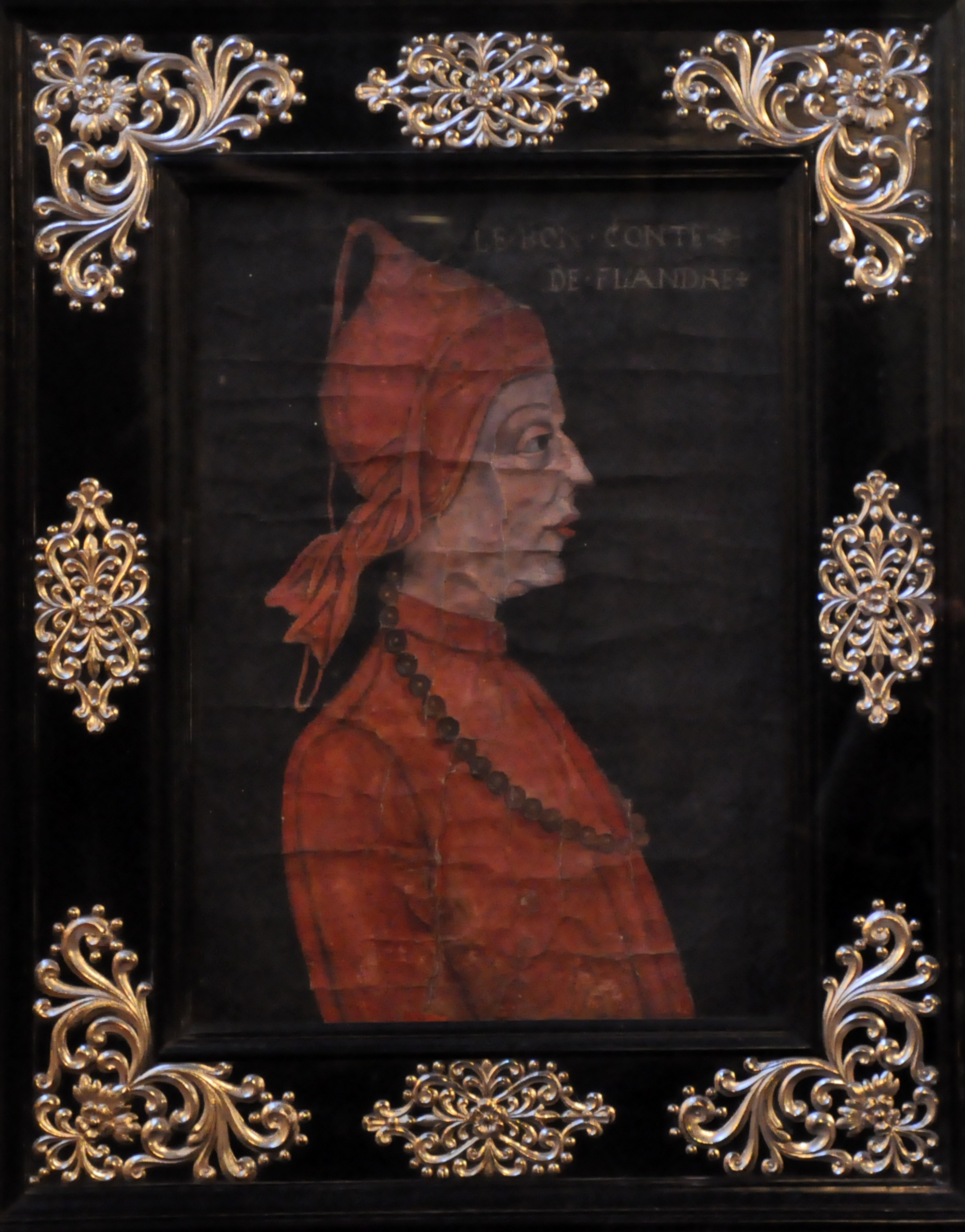
Charles the Good, Count of Flanders, portrait from the 15th century

The influence of tournaments seems to have been decisive. (Note: Fenske (1986, pp. 148–150.)) Indeed, the time of the invention of the coat of arms was also the time of the birth of tournament fashions, particularly in Northern and Western France, which were an important vector for the dissemination of this new emblem. Tournaments were the ideal place to show off one's coat of arms, as part of a ritualized system that emphasized individual achievement. (Note: Nieus (2017, pp. 136–145.))

The first documented tournaments appear to have taken place in northern France, one of the earliest known tournament organizers being Charles the Good, Count of Flanders and Count of Amiens, close to Vermandois, one of the birthplaces of the coat of arms, and allied with Renaud II de Clermont. The organizers of the first tournaments were high-ranking figures such as the great Anglo-Norman lords, Robert I de Dreux (who bore the Vermandois escutcheon) and Henry I, Count of Champagne. The two phenomena, tournaments and coats of arms, appear at the same time and in the same place, and are therefore linked, forming part of a trend to enhance the status of the aristocracy.

The development of coats of arms must therefore be linked to a form of individualization of the feats that knights are expected to accomplish. The knight's prowess must be easily recognizable, (Note: Fenske (1986, pp. 153–154.)) and this prowess must be traceable to the lineage to which he belongs. (Note: Jones (2008, pp. 166–167.))

==== Identity: lineage and anthroponymy ====
The birth of coats of arms is closely correlated with the new social organization established by seigniorial lineages. From the mid-12th century onwards, coats of arms were used to situate individuals within their group and society. They were born of seigniorial French: encellulement, which anchored each individual in a group. By the end of the 12th century, coats of arms had become hereditary.

The invention of the coat of arms is also linked to other contemporary changes, such as the appearance of the first patronymic names and the adoption of long clothing. Men's clothing took on new colours and ornaments; society increasingly needed signs to identify individuals, and colour played a role in this identification.

Both heraldry and anthroponymy are ultimately ways of expressing kinship and are therefore linked to the transmission of property.

=== Coats of arms for all nobility ===
==== From counts to great-vassals ====
The heraldry of the shield was first seen among the aristocratic elite of counts, before spreading by imitation to squire lords and then to ordinary knights. By the end of the twelfth century and into the thirteenth, coats of arms were being adopted by all noblemen, right down to simple squires.

Between the Loire and Meuse rivers, in western France and England, knights banneret adopted coats of arms around 1160–1200, simple knights around 1180–1220, and simple squires around 1220–1260. In central and southern France, the lesser nobility began to use coats of arms a little later. In the Holy Roman Empire, while all nobles used coats of arms around 1210–1220, ordinary knights did not have personal armorial seals until around 1250. In Scotland, Spain, Italy, and Scandinavia, the process of the adoption of heraldry occurred with a chronological lag.

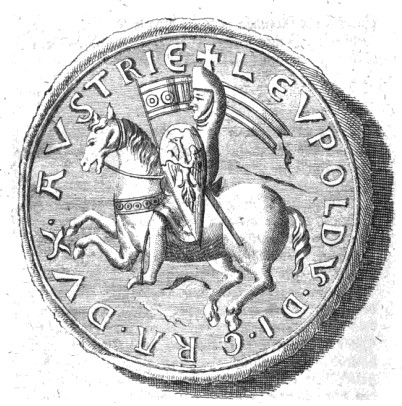
Seal of the Austrian Duke Leopold V, Duke of Austria. Drawing published in 1780.

In most cases, vassals and under-vassals began by adopting their lord's coat of arms just as it was, when it was linked to the fiefdom. The personal arms they then adopted were often the same, but slightly modified. The result was a group of coats of arms made up of unrelated families from the same region, with very similar coats of arms. These are common in northern and eastern France, the Holy Roman Empire, Navarre, and Aragon. In the Holy Roman Empire, princes often first chose the eagle emblem, symbolizing their attachment to the Holy Roman Empire. Thus, the Austrian Duke Henry II Jasomirgott, his son Duke Leopold V, and his grandson Leopold VI wore an eagle as an emblem, before the new Austrian Duke Frederick II adopted in 1230 the symbol that has been perpetuated to this day in Austria, a silver fess on a red background.

Some coats of arms are also passed down through adoubement (i.e., being knighted). In this case, the adoubee adopts the arms of the adoubeur, a more powerful lord, in whole or in part. This is the story told of Geoffrey Plantagenet, knighted in 1127 by his father-in-law Henry I, King of England, and whose coat of arms can be seen on the Plantagenet enamel. Other sources attest to this practice. Thus, Hugh IV, Count of Saint-Pol, knighted in 1179 by King Henry II of England, used a seal showing a shield with the arms of both England (Gules, three golden lions passant) and Candavène (Azure, three golden sheaves). Similarly, around 1170, Guillaume de Hainaut bore arms of France impaling Hainaut. Other examples are known.

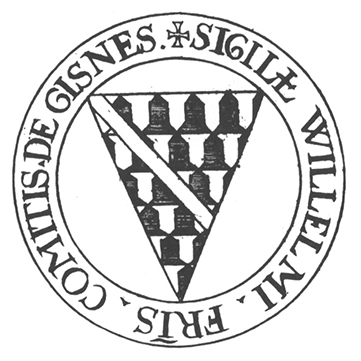
Seal of Guillaume de Guînes (1177). The bend may be the first known instance of cadency. Drawing published in 1641.

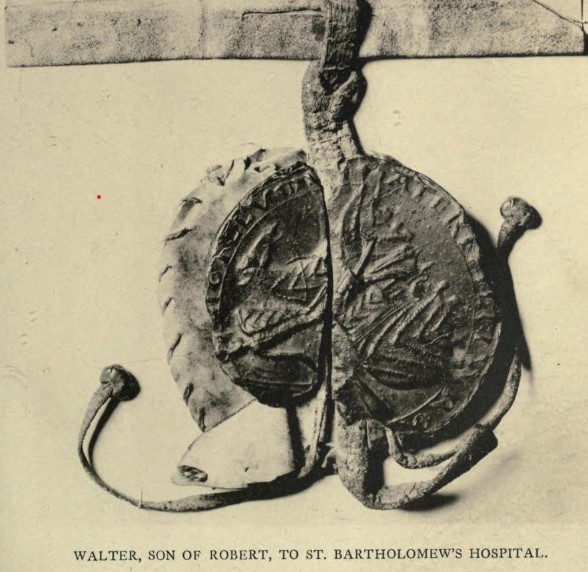
Seal (c. 1147/1160) of Walter Fitz Robert, Lord of Little Dunmow. Photograph published in 1918.

As early as 1180-1200, the system of cadency seals appeared, especially in France, England, Scotland, the Rhine Valley, and Switzerland. According to Pastoureau, the earliest known instance dates from 1177: the brother of Count Arnould II of Guînes, Guillaume, used the arms of the Counts of Guînes on his seal, adding a bend.

According to Nieus, the seal of Walter Fitz Robert of Little Dunmow (c. 1147/1160), showing a shield, horse cover, and saddle cloth covered with the chevron of the Clares, of whom he was a cousin, may even be older. Cadency allows the main emblem to be used in a variety of ways. It is not used everywhere: in Italy, for example, all members of the lineage bear the same arms.

==== Women's coats of arms ====
The earliest coats of arms of noblewomen date from the second half of the 12th century. In England, the earliest female coat of arms is thought to be that of Rohese de Clare (died 1156), niece of Gilbert de Clare, Earl of Pembroke. In France, it is the seal of Yseult de Dol, wife of Asculphe de Subligny, affixed to a text from 1183. In 1188, the coat of arms on the seal of Agnès de Saint-Vérain, a shield charged with two fesses and an orle of martlets, was recorded. The following year, in 1189, Theresa of Portugal, wife of Philip of Alsace, used arms similar to those of Portugal on her counter-seal. In 1198, Marie de Champagne, wife of Count Baldwin IX of Flanders, made the opposite choice, using her husband's coat of arms.

First female armorial seals

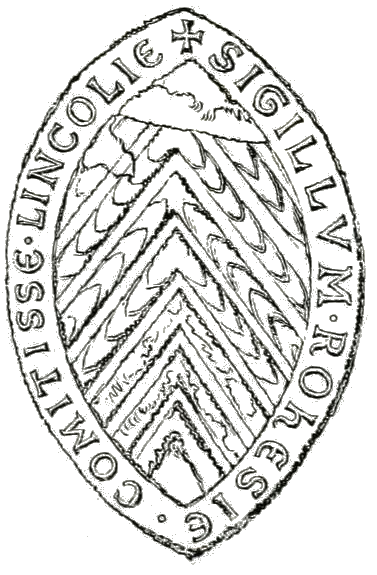
Seal of Rohese de Clare, wife of Gilbert de Gant, Earl of Lincoln. Probably engraved in 1156. Drawing published in 1846.

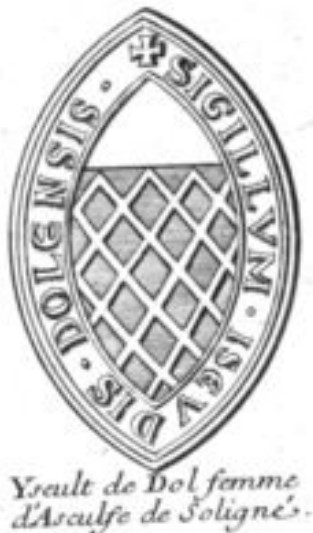
Seal of Iseult de Dol (1183) wife of Asculf de Subligny. Drawing published in 1707.

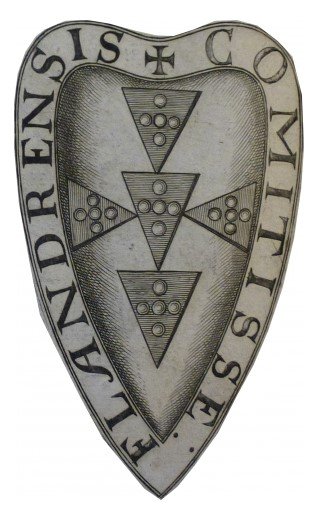
Seal of Theresa of Portugal, wife of Philip I, Count of Flanders (1189). Drawing published in 1643.

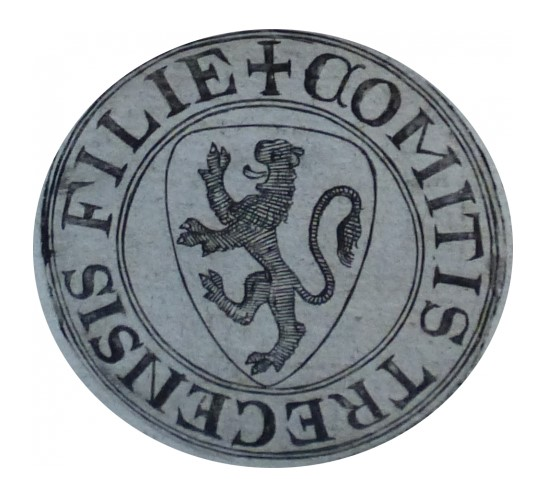
Seal of Marie de Champagne, wife of Baldwin IX of Flanders (1198). Drawing published in 1643.

Then, in the first half of the 13th century, women's coats of arms became more widespread, a little later in the Holy Roman Empire than in France or England. Women's coats of arms were those of their fathers or husbands and, rarely, personal coats of arms. For example, Mathilde de Courtenay used a shield with a lion passant on a field strewn with billets, the arms of the County of Nevers of which she was heiress, while the Courtenay arms are gold with three torteaux (red roundels), those of her first husband Hervé IV of Donzy are a plain shield with a vairy chief, and those of her second husband Guigues IV of Forez are gules with a golden dolphin

More often than not, married women's coats of arms are double coats of arms, formed by juxtaposing their father's and husband's coats of arms. When a wife brings her husband material and immaterial goods of greater value than those of her husband - for whom marriage is, therefore, hypergamous - it is not uncommon for him to adopt his wife's coat of arms. Thus, in the early thirteenth century, Guy II of Dampierre adopted the coat of arms of his wife Mathilde of Bourbon, heir to this seigneury. Their son and heir also took his mother's coat of arms, as did Roger de Meulan at the end of the 12th century, who became lord of Gournay-sur-Marne, who inherited from his mother, Agnès de Montfort: his family branch then used the Montfort coat of arms. Similarly, in 1234, Roger IV de Foix used the arms of his mother, Ermessenda de Castellbò, because he was, through her, heir to the viscounty of Castelbon.

== Coats of arms throughout society from the 13th century onwards ==
As the use of seals increased in the 13th century, the use of coats of arms became more and more common, in all social categories. Thus, it was through the seal that the use of coats of arms spread throughout society. Seals and coats of arms share the same function: to express identity

=== Ecclesiastics ===
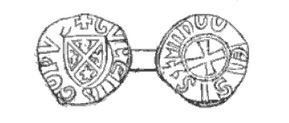
Denarius of Guillaume de Joinville, bishop of Langres, struck circa 1209-1210. Drawing published in 1858.

In the 13th century, high prelates used coats of arms specific to their bishopric. The earliest were apparently those of the bishopric of Langres, used by bishop Guillaume de Joinville around 1210-1215 on coins, azure semé-de-lis or, overall a saltire gules, followed by those of the bishopric of Beauvais, seen on a seal affixed to a deed of 1222 by bishop Milo of Nanteuil, argent a cross between four keys gules.

However, popes as early as Innocent IV (1243-1254) used their family coats of arms. From the 14th century onwards, ecclesiastics, from the simple parish priest to the prelate, were sealed with their coat of arms.

=== Bourgeois and peasants ===
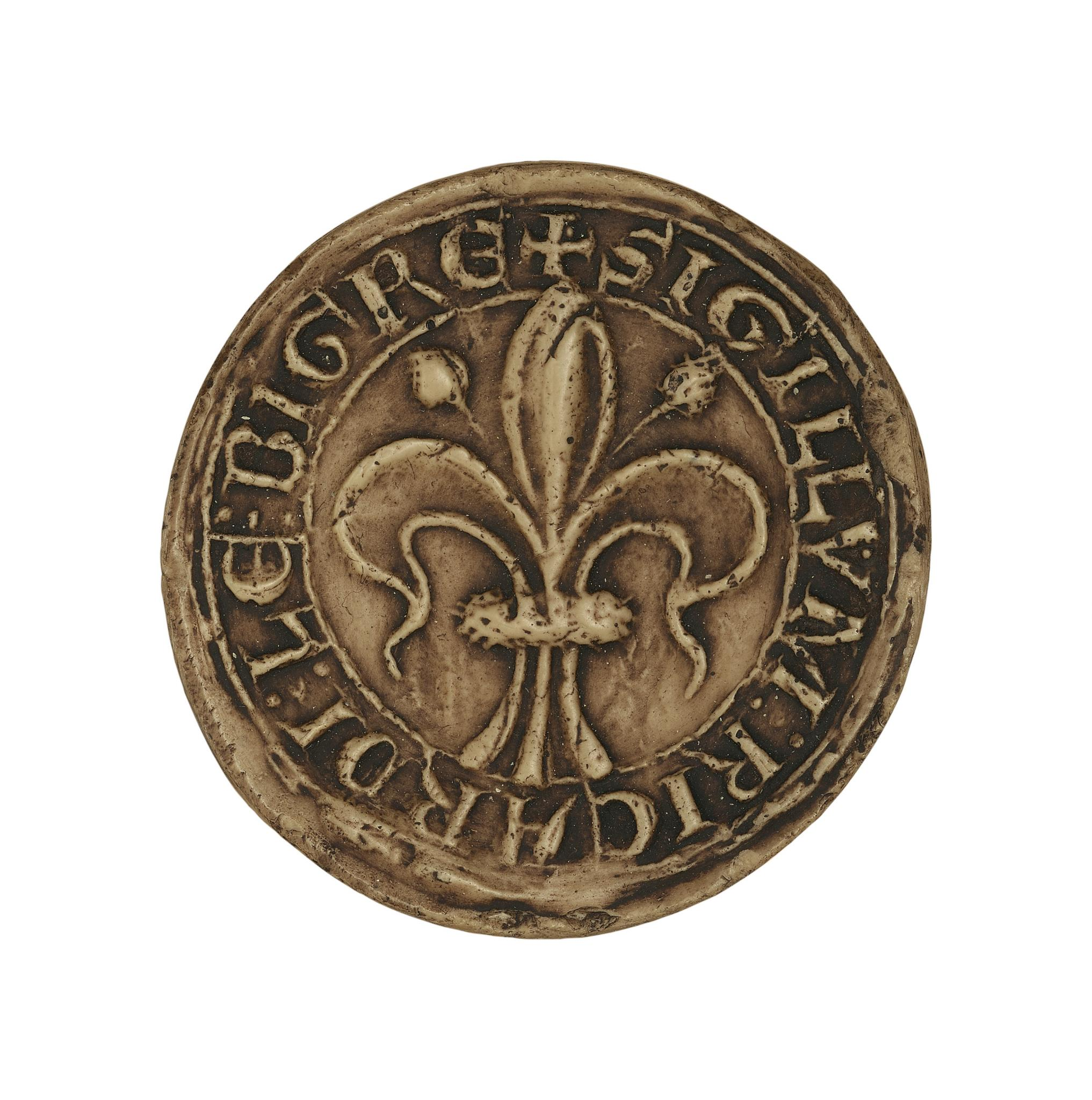
Seal of Richard Le Bigre, Norman peasant (circa 1280). Archives départementales de la Seine-Maritime, Normandie collection no. 697

In the 13th century, the use of coats of arms spread, including among commoners. Of the entire corpus of medieval coats of arms currently known, two out of five are commoners. Unsurprisingly, the coats of arms of the bourgeoisie and artisans were most numerous in the most urbanized regions: Northern France, Flanders, Germany, Northern Italy, and Languedoc.

Peasants' coats of arms also appeared in the early thirteenth century and then spread, especially to England, Normandy, Flanders, and Switzerland. Frequently, they are not inscribed in a shield, but affixed directly to the field, so that some authors dispute that they are coats of arms. In Normandy, the most common figures are plants, especially flowers.

In the 14th century, common women also adopted coats of arms, but many of them, like the nobles, used changing emblems.

Coats of arms are therefore not reserved for a particular social class. However, they are essential to the nobility. Every noble family claims to have been granted a coat of arms by a prestigious personage. The adoption of the coat of arms by non-combatants attests to the symbolic significance of this object, which is an emblem of power and strength, but also of peace and justice, and shows the link between the individual and the group.

=== Cities and communities ===
As the use of seals expanded, so did the use of coats of arms by communities and institutions. The oldest known city seal is that of Cologne, dating from 1149 and depicting the Apostle Peter, the city's patron saint, but the first armorial city seals appeared later, at the end of the 12th century. The earliest is that of Hertford, England, affixed to a text dated c. 1180-1190. In the first half of the 13th century, many towns adopted the armorial seal.

In the 14th century, especially in the second half, tradesmen also adopted coats of arms, inspired by those of the lord or the town, or evoking the trade concerned. At the same time, religious communities began to use coats of arms, probably first and foremost the cathedral chapters.

=== Introducing heraldry ===
By the middle of the 12th century, the main components of the heraldic system were already in place: ordinaries (geometric charges), geometric partitions and, perhaps later, animal charges (especially the eagle and lion) and plant charges (Candavène sheaves, Roucy cabbages). In this new system, colours are more important than figures. They are limited to six: white, yellow, red, blue, black and green. Their hue is irrelevant, whether light or dark. Even more important than the colours themselves are the rules governing their combination: they are divided into two groups, metals (gold and silver, generally shown as yellow and white) on the one hand, and colours (gules, azure, sable, vert, i.e., red, blue, black and green) on the other, with the rule of tincture forbidding the superimposition of two colours from the same group. This rule seems to have originated as early as the middle of the 12th century, the first coats of arms being bichromatic so that they could be seen from a distance.

From the end of the 12th century onwards, coats of arms, which were simple at first, usually two-coloured and featuring mainly animal figures, became more complex. During the 13th century, the language of blazon began to take shape, and Western heraldry became organized and regulated. The repertoire of figures became fixed. The first armorials were published after 1270. From the outset, the language of coats of arms was the vernacular, not Latin, since the church played no role in the creation of coats of arms, and Latin was ill-suited to such descriptions.

From the second half of the 12th century, very soon after the birth of coats of arms, the heraldic crest spread throughout Europe. Initially, it was a figure painted on the combatant's helmet, before becoming a separate object, of which very few examples have survived. It is known almost exclusively from the crests depicted on seals. The crest was first used individually, before becoming a family emblem in the Holy Roman Empire from the middle of the 13th century, and throughout Western Europe in the 14th century. (Note: Pastoureau (2004, pp. 240–243.))

== See also ==
- Achievement (heraldry)
- Heraldry
- History of heraldry
- Seal (emblem)
- Tournament (medieval)

== Bibliography ==
- Pastoureau, Miche (2003). Traité d'héraldique (4th ed.). Paris: Picard. ISBN 2-7084-0703-1.
- Hablot, Laurent (2019). Manuel d'héraldique et d'emblématique médiévale: Des signes, une société, comprendre les emblèmes du Moyen Âge (xiie – xvie siècles). Tours: Presses universitaires François Rabelais. p. 336. ISBN 978-2-86906-689-2.
- Ailes, Adrian (1992). The knight, heraldry and armour: the role of recognition and the origins of heraldry. Boydell Press. ISBN 9780851153193.
- Nieus, Jean-François (2017). "L'invention des armoiries en contexte. Haute aristocratie, identités familiales et culture chevaleresque entre France et Angleterre. 1100-1160" (PDF). Journal des savants. 1 (1): 93–155. doi:10.3406/jds.2017.6387.
- Fenske, Lutz (1986). Adel und Rittertum im Spiegel früher heraldischer Formen und deren Entwicklung.
- Jones, Robert W. (2008). Identifying the Warrior on the Pre-Heraldic Battlefield. Boydell & Brewer. ISBN 978-1-84615-610-6.
- Hablot, Laurent (2012). Entre pratique militaire et symbolique du pouvoir, l'écu armorié au xiie siècle. Lisbonne: Estudos de Heràldica medieval.
- Pastoureau, Michel (2004). La naissance des armoiries. De l'identité individuelle à l'identité familiale. Paris: éditions du Seuil. ISBN 9782020136112.
