= Hugh II of Saint-Pol =

Hugh II (French, Hugues) (died 1130) was the count of St. Pol in Artois, after having succeeded his brother Guy I who died without issue. He was the son of Hugh I, Count of Saint-Pol. He participated in the First Crusade (1096–99) with his son Enguerrand, where they both won fame as military leaders. Being vassals of Eustace III of Boulogne, they probably travelled east in his company, among the retinue of Godfrey of Bouillon.

Hugh and Enguerrand participated in the Siege of Antioch in 1098, where they were central in raiding the Turkish forces. Hugues is last mentioned in the east during the Siege of Jerusalem in 1099.

Upon returning, he took up arms for the Count of Hainaut against Robert II, Count of Flanders, and then his successor, Baldwin VII. In 1115, he lost the castle of Encre (now in Albert) to Baldwin, and in 1117 lost Saint-Pol itself; however, St. Pol was returned to him shortly after at the request of the Count of Boulogne. After Baldwin's death, he entered the coalition formed by Robert's widow Clementia of Burgundy, with the aim of unseating Charles the Good from the county Flanders and giving it to William of Ypres. Charles triumphed over this coalition and, upon entering the county of Saint-Pol, razed all the fortresses and forced the count to offer peace in exchange for restoring the sovereignty of Flanders in the region.

Hugh's first wife was Elissende of Ponthieu, daughter of Enguerrand II, Count of Ponthieu and Adelaide of Normandy. Hugh's children from his first marriage were:

- Enguerrand, died of disease after the capture of Ma'arrat al-Numan around Christmas 1098.
- Hugues III, succeeded his father as Count.
- Béatrix of Saint-Pol, heiress of Amiens, married Robert, son of Thomas of Coucy.

Hugh then married Marguerite of Clermont, daughter of Renaud II, Count of Clermont. They had two sons, Raoul and Guy.

== Notes ==
Preceded by Guy I	Count of Saint Pol; 1083–1130	Succeeded by Hugues III
