= Cistercian Hymnal =

The Cistercian Hymnal is a compilation of the ancient texts and melodies sung by Cistercian monks and nuns during the Liturgy of the Hours. This collection of hymns influenced the Cistercian Order's identity, since early abbots emphasized the compositions' musical quality. The hymnal developed in the course of the centuries.

== Origins ==
The first Cistercian Hymnal is dated approximately 1108, under the abbacy of Stephen Harding. He sent monks from his Abbey in Burgundy to Milan in order to copy the hymnal kept there. It was considered to be Saint Ambrose’s original, and Ambrosian hymns enjoyed great prestige in the Rule of St. Benedict since they were purported to have been in use at Milan since the 4th Century. The Cistercians, working from what they found in Milan, compiled a hymnal of 34 texts on 19 different melodies and used this for about twenty years. At the end of the 1130s, after Stephen Harding’s death, the General Chapter entrusted Bernard of Clairvaux with the revision of the hymnal (and other parts of the Office) because they considered the first version to be repetitive, and the Ambrosian melodies grated on their Burgundian sensibilities.

== Revision under Bernard of Clairvaux ==
Respecting Abbot Stephen’s solemn warning and knowing that the Benedictine Rule mentions the Ambrosianum four times (for vigil RB 9:4, lauds RB 12:4/13:11 and vespers RB 17:8), Bernard included the major hymns from Milan. But for the small hours of terce, sext and none, the Rule uses the word hymnus; on this basis they added 21 non-Milanese texts to the hymnal for use at terce and compline. That made it possible to again sing the great classics such as Vexilla regis for Holy Week, Conditor alme siderum in Advent, or Quem terra pontus for the Marian feasts. Consciously following the same principles as the first generation, they kept the 34 primitive hymns, except for a few textual variants made for the sake of orthodoxy. For a greater variety of texts, they chose to use the principle of division, commonly practiced at the time: The hymn is sung in full at vespers, half is taken at vigil and the other at lauds.

The melodies, on the other hand, were treated with less respect: most were modified, six simply eliminated, while others, mostly traditional, were added. Chrysogonus Waddell identifies seven new melodies, the last four of which are Cistercian creations: Optatis votis omnium, Almi prophet (used today for Aurea lucis), O quam glorifica, Deus tuorum militum, Mysterium ecclesiae, Iesu nostra redemptio and Iam Christus astra, all very expressive and of great emotional intensity. They ended up with a set of 55 texts for 37 melodies, which were faithfully passed down up to the Council of Trent, with some additions to mark new liturgical feasts: the solemnities of the Blessed Sacrament, Saint Bernard, the Visitation; the feasts of St. Anne, St. Joseph, and the Guardian Angels.

== Post-Tridentine Revisions ==
In 1656, following the demands of the Council of Trent, Abbot General Claude Vaussin published the Breviarium cistercium iuxta ritum romanum: except the Veni Creator, all the festive hymns of Terce and Compline were moved to the Major Hours. Otherwise, all the melodies of the hymnal were retained, and some texts written by Cistercians appear in the Office: for example the hymns composed at that time for the Feast of All Saints of the Order, or the poem Iesu dulcis memoria, written by an English Cistercian of the Twelfth century for the feast of the Holy Name of Jesus. The Ambrosian roots largely disappeared; after centuries of habit, the Cistercians were eager to preserve their textual versions of the hymns, even when scholarly research showed that the Cistercian texts did not always correspond with the Ambrosian originals. or even different hymns for the special liturgical times. And whereas the modern Roman breviary had different hymns for every liturgical hour of every day, the Cistercians wanted to keep a single feria hymn for the entire week at vigil, another hymn for the entire week at lauds, and another at vespers. The only variation for them was between the seasons of winter and summer.

== After the Second Vatican Council ==
During the twentieth century, the liturgical renewal granted, among other things, a prominent place to the Ambrosian hymns in the Roman Breviary of 1974: for example, Veni Redemptor gentium, Iam surgit hora tertia, Hic est dies verus Dei. The concerns of the Council for textual criticism, historical truth, theological renewal, variety in the choice of texts, prompted the writers of Liturgia Horarum to revise the everyday texts or replace them with new texts, especially for saints' feast days.

Various Cistercian communities have been trying to achieve synthesis between the preservation of Cistercian heritage and adapt to the needs of the modern era and the liturgy of the universal Church.

== Historical Editions Online ==
- Hymnarium cisterciense – Lichtenthal 28 (Mid 1200s)
- Lichtenthal 28 et 32, c. 1250, Badische Landesbibliothek Karlsruhe
- Sedletz Abbey (1700)
- Unidentified Hymnal from the 17th or 18th Century
- The Westmalle edition from 1952

== Printed Editions in the 20th Century ==
- Hymnarium Cisterciense, issued under Abbot Augustine Marre, Rome, 1909.
- Hymnarium Cisterciense, issued under Abbot Edmund Bernardini, Westmalle, 1941.
- Hymnarium Cisterciense, issued under Abbot Matthew Quatember, Rome, 1952.
