= Cîteaux Moralia in Job =

12th-century illuminated manuscript

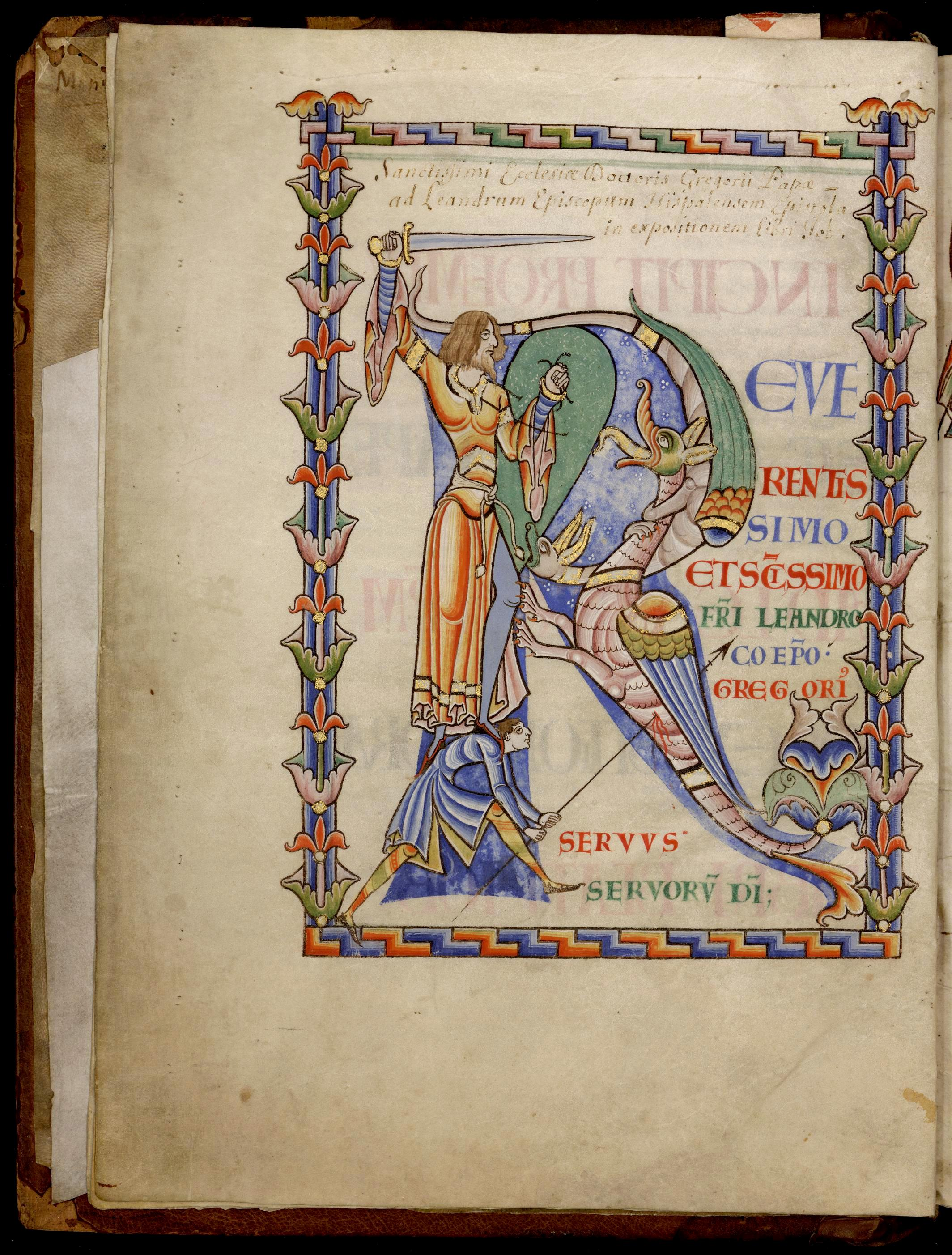
Frontispiece and initial to the Letter to Leander, Moralia in Job; Dijon, Bibliothèque municipale, ms 168:4v.

The Cîteaux Moralia in Job is an illuminated copy of Gregory the Great's Moralia in Job made at the reform monastery of Cîteaux in Burgundy around 1111. Housed at the municipal library in Dijon (Bibliothèque municipale), it is one of the most familiar but least understood illuminated manuscripts of the Middle Ages.

== Gregory's Moralia in Job ==
The Moralia were a commentary on Job; it was one of the most popular theological texts at the time, and copies of it were made in all the early Cistercian abbeys. The Cîteaux copy was begun around 1111. Several scribes worked on it (five hands have been identified) and one artist decorated it. Many of the images portray scenes of violence. The monks appearing in the manuscript often wear threadbare habits, thereby accentuating their idealistic poverty. That the style of the illustrations is decidedly English is explained by the fact that the abbot at the time, Stephen Harding, was from England.

The Cîteaux version was used as the prototype for a further copy made by monks at La Ferté Abbey, but the images in their version were less violent. They had been more greatly influenced by the regional style in Burgundy.

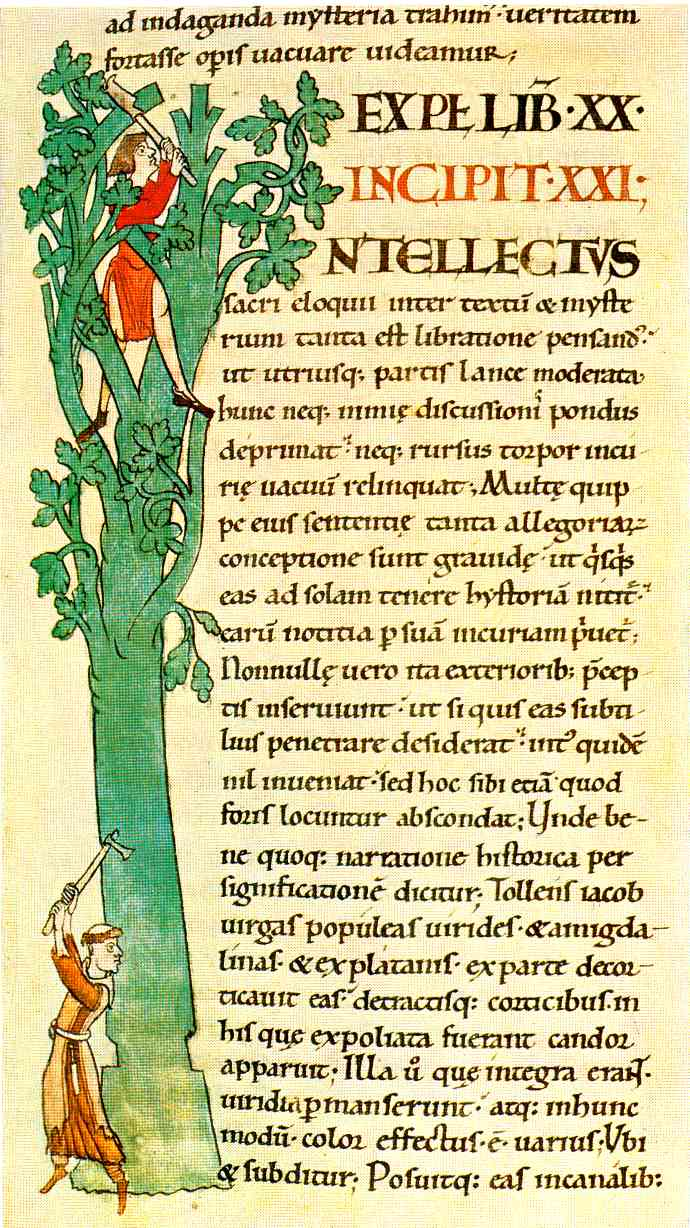
Initial to Book 21, Moralia in Job; Dijon, Bibliothèque municipale, ms 173:41.

== Literature ==
- Cîteaux manuscript summaries 168–170, 173 (in French).
- C. Oursel, Miniatures Cisterciennes (1109-1134), (Macon: 1960) pp. 11ff, pls. XXI-XXXIV.
