= Galbert of Bruges =

Flemish chronicler

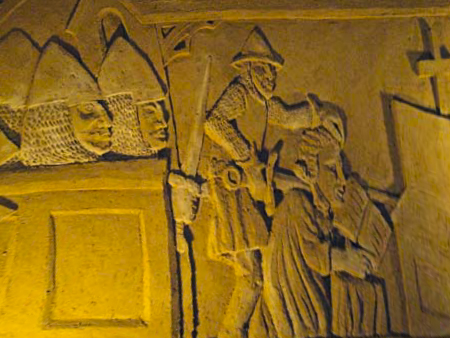
Relief of the murder of Count Charles the Good, in 1127.

Galbert of Bruges (Galbertus notarius Brugensis in Latin) was a Flemish cleric and chronicler. A resident of Bruges and a functionary in the administration of the count of Flanders, he is known for his day-by-day Latin account De multro, traditione et occisione gloriosi Karoli comitis Flandriarum of the events surrounding the murder of Count Charles the Good in 1127 and the ensuing civil war in Flanders up to the accession of Thierry of Alsace as count in the summer of 1128.
