= Hugh III of Saint-Pol =

French count

Hugh III (French: Hugues) was count of Saint-Pol from 1130 until his death in 1141. He was responsible for massacres and therefore excommunicated.

== Biography ==
Hugh was the son of Hugh II and Elissende of Ponthieu. He waged a vigorous war against the Collet family, whom he forced to take refuge in the abbey of Saint-Riquier. After besieging the fortress, he stormed it on 28 August 1131 and put it to fire and the sword, killing men, women, and children, including the clergy. The survivors, including the abbot, took refuge in Abbeville. The abbot raised a complaint at the Council of Reims (1131), which excommunicated Hugh in 1132. The ban was confirmed by Pope Innocent II.

His further atrocities against the clergy brought the intervention of King Louis VI, at which point he submitted to penance. He obtained the absolution of Pope Innocent II in 1137 by financing the foundation of three abbeys: Cercamp, Klaarkamp, and Ourscamp.

In 1140, he joined with the Count of Hainaut against Thierry, Count of Flanders, but was defeated.

Hugh and Beatrix had:

- Enguerrand
- Hugh, died without issue in 1150
- Anselm

Beatrix, the mother of these children, is buried at Cercamp. Hugh remarried to Marguerite of Clermont. They had:

- Ralph, died 4 April 1142, buried in Cercamp
- Guy, married Matilda of Doullens
- Angélique or Angéline, wife of Anselm of Housdain
- Elise, wife of Robert V, Lord of Béthune,
- Beatrix, wife of Robert, son of Ralph I, Lord of Coucy

== Sources ==
- Galbert de Bruges (2005). Ross, James Bruce (ed.). The Murder of Charles the Good. Columbia University Press.
- Tanner, Heather (2004). Families, Friends and Allies, Boulogne and Politics in Northern France and England, c.879-1160. Brill.
- Maurus Dantine, Charles Clémencet, Nicolas Viton de Saint-Allais, Ursin Durand, François Clément, L'art de vérifier les dates des faits historiques, des chartes, des chroniques [etc].... 1750 and subsequent editions
- G Er Sauvage, Histoire de Saint-Pol
- François César Louandre, Histoire ancienne et moderne d'Abbeville et de son arrondissement A. Boulanger, 1834 (online version)
- Ernest Warlop: Campus Avenae: het wapen van de graven van Saint-Pol. In: Carlos Wyffels u. a. (eds.): Gedenkboek Michiel Mispelon. Familia et Patria, Kortemark-Handzame 1982, pp. 587–599
- Jean-François Nieus: Un pouvoir comtal entre Flandre et France. Saint-Pol, 1000–1300. De Boeck, Brussels 2005 (Bibliothèque du Moyen Âge 23) ISBN 280414772X (also: Louvain-la-Neuve, university dissertation, 2001: Le comté de Saint-Pol des origines à la fin du XIIIe siècle)
