= Harding Bible =

12th century illuminated manuscript

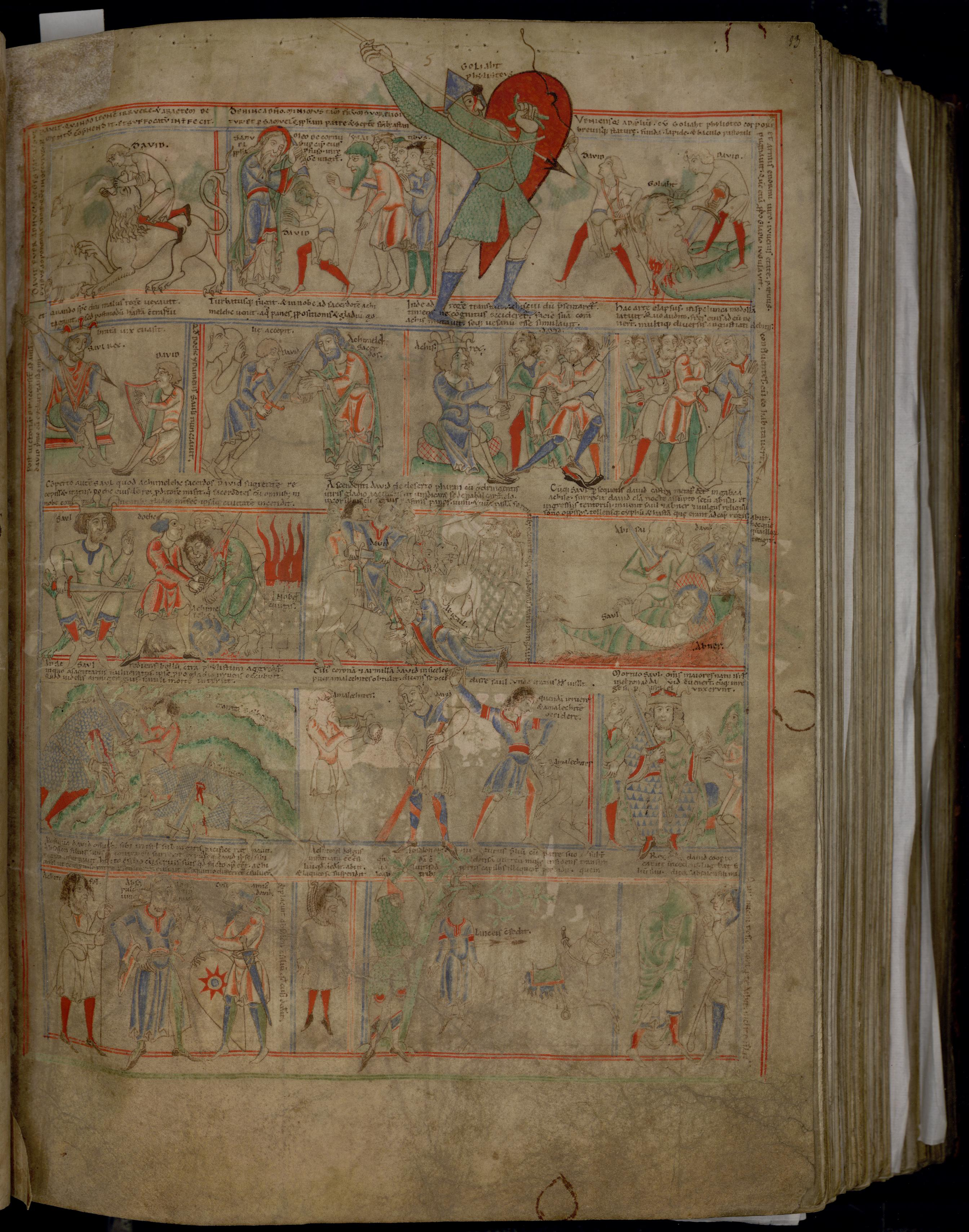
- Artist: Cîteaux Scriptorium
- Year: 1109
- Dimensions: 47.4 cm × 32.6 cm (18.7 in × 12.8 in)
- Location: Bibliothèque municipale de Dijon
- Accession: Ms. 12-15

The Harding Bible is a 12th-century illuminated Latin Bible created in Cîteaux Abbey during the abbacy of Stephen Harding, dated 1109. It belongs to a corpus of manuscripts illuminated in the Cîteaux scriptorium in the 12th century, most of which is now held in the public library of the city of Dijon (ms.12-15). It is considered a masterpiece of Cistercian book illumination.

== History ==
The Harding Bible was created at the behest of Stephen Harding, one of the founders of the Cistercian order and abbot of the Cîteaux Abbey from 1109 to 1112. The monitum, inserted at the end of the first tome (ms.13, fol.170v), records the date 1109 and relates the context of its creation. It stipulates that Harding had the scriptures copied from several manuscripts in order to remain as close to Jerome's Vulgate as possible. For the Old Testament, he also states he reached out to rabbis who supplied the Chaldean and Hebraic versions to resolve problematic passages. The second tome (ms.14-15) was completed two years later by the same scribe that worked on the Cîteaux Moralia in Job dated 1111. The Harding Bible is one of the first manuscripts illuminated in the abbey scriptorium. The Bible was used for liturgical worship, especially for readings during meals, as noted in a marginalia (ms.15, fol.166).

The abbey was closed after the French Revolution, and the manuscripts from the abbey library were transferred to the city of Dijon and its public library.

== Description ==
The Bible originally consisted of two tomes, which were later rebound in four volumes:

- Volume 1 (ms.12): 115 folios with the Prologus Galaetus by Jerome and the Octateuch
- Volume 2 (ms.13): 150 folios with the Books of Kings, Prophets, and ending with the encyclical by Stephen Harding (f.150v)
- Volume 3 (ms.14): 204 folios with the Books of Job, Psalms, Proverbs, Ecclesiastes, Song of Songs, Daniel, Chronicles, Ezra, Esther, Wisdom, Sirach, Judith, Tobit, Maccabees
- Volume 4 (ms.15): 132 folios with the New Testament

Three copyists and two illuminators have been identified. The first illuminator painted the ornaments of the first tome, consisting only of initials, rinceaux (scrolls), animal figures, and a single human head (ms. 13, fol. 132v). The second tome contains two full-page illustrations, 6 miniatures and 29 historiated initials showing a powerful Anglo-Saxon influence. According to specialists, it could be the work of Stephen Harding himself.

=== See also ===
- Stephen Harding
- Cîteaux Abbey
- Cistercian Order
- Cîteaux Moralia in Job
