= Renaud II of Clermont-en-Beauvaisis =

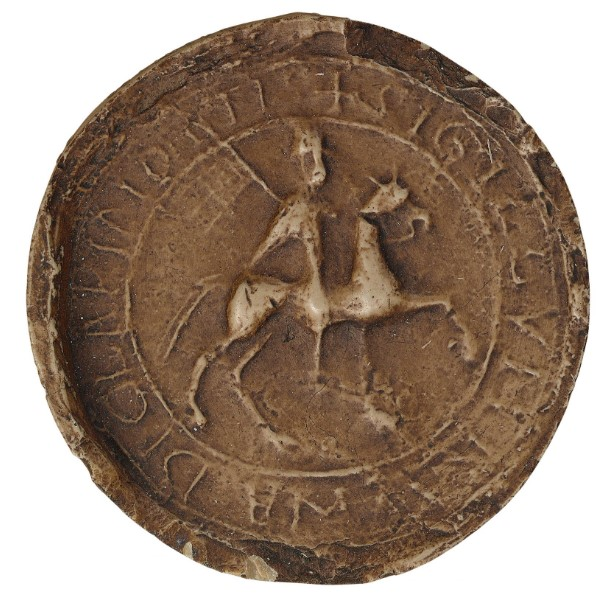
Seal of Renaud of Clermont, c. 1105-1120

Renaud II of Clermont (Renaud/Rainald II de Clermont; 1075–1152) was son of Hugh I, Count of Clermont-en-Beauvaisis and Marguerite de Roucy (daughter of Hilduin IV, Count of Montdidier). Renaud became Count of Clermont-en-Beauvaisis upon his father's death in 1101.

== First Crusade ==
Renaud took the Cross and joined the First Crusade in the army of Hugh the Great, Count of Vermandois, brother of Philip I of France. Hugh led a small army that travelled by ship, in an armada commanded by Arnout II, Count of Aarschot, to the Holy Land. In addition to Ranaud, some of the prominent members of Hugh's army included Stephen of Aumale, Walter of Domart-en-Ponthieu (St.-Valery), Alan IV Fregant, Duke of Brittany, Walo II of Chaumont-en-Vexin, Girard I of Roussillon, and William V, Lord of Montpellier.

Among the first battles this contingent fought was the Siege of Nicaea. Rainaud also joined Hugh in the Battle of Dorylaeum whose forces were at the rear of the main attack.

Sweetenham reports that during the siege, a Turk armed himself and rode towards the Crusaders at a high speed. Rainaud mounted with his shield and lance, and killed the Turk outright, keeping his horse, much to the delight of the Franks. The Turk was carrying a letter allegedly from Mecca stating that the Turks were bringing their forces to joust with the Franks in battle. It has been suggested that Rainaud's actions infringed on the rules of war extant at the time.

It is not clear whether Rainaud returned to France with Hugh in 1098. There are not records of his serving in any other armies.

== Marriages ==
In 1103, Renaud married Adelaide, Countess of Vermandois, daughter of Herbert IV, Count of Vermandois, and his wife Adele of Valois. Renaud and Adelaide had at least one child:

- Margaret of Clermont, married first to Charles I, Count of Flanders, second to Hugh II, Count of Saint-Pol, third to Baldwin of Encre.

Widowed, Renaud married for the second time, in 1129, to Clemence de Bar, daughter of Reginald I, Count of Bar, and his wife Giselle de Vaudémont. Renaud and Clemence had 10 children:

- Renaud
- Hugh (d. 1200), abbot of Creil, canon in Toul, archdeacon of Ligny
- Guy
- Gautier
- Margaret, married to Guy III de Senlis, Grand Butler of France
- Constance, married to Roger de La Tournelle.
- Matilda (d. 1200), married to Alberic III, Count of Dammartin.
- Raoul I the Red, Count of Clermont-Beauvaisis
- Simon I (d. after 1189), Seigneur of Nesle and Ailly-sur-Noye
- Etienne

Upon his death, Renaud was succeeded as Count of Clermont-en-Beauvaisis by his son Raoul.

== Sources ==
- Guenée, Bernard (1978). "Les généalogies entre l'histoire et la politique: la fierté d'être Capétien, en France, au Moyen Age". Annales. Histoire, Sciences Sociales (in French). 33e Année, No. 3 (May - Jun.): 450–477.
- Galbert (de Bruges), The Murder, Betrayal, and Slaughter of the Glorious Charles, Count of Flanders, translated by John Jeffrey Rider, Yale University Press, 2013.
- Prime, Temple, Note on the County of Clermont, Notes Relative to Certain Matters Connected with French History, De Vinne Press, New York, 1903 (available on Google Books)
- Riley-Smith, Jonathan, The First Crusaders, 1095-1131, Cambridge University Press, London, 1997, pg. 218 (available on Google Books).
- Edgington, Susan, Albert of Aachen: Historia Ierosolimitana, History of the Journey to Jerusalem, Clarendon Press, Gloucestershire, 2007 (available on Google Books)
- A Database of Crusaders to the Holy Land, 1095-1149
- Sweetenham, Carol, The Chanson D'Antioche: An Old French Account of the First Crusade, Routledge, Florence, Kentucky, 2016 (available on Google Books)
- Albert of Aix, Historia Hierosolymitanae Expeditions (archive).
