= Margaret of Clermont =

Countess of Amiens (Regnant)
- Reign: 1118-1132
- Predecessor: Renaud II, Count of Clermont-en-Beauvaisis

Countess of Flanders
- Reign: 1115-1127

Countess of Flanders
- Reign: -1132

Countess of Saint-Pol
- Reign: 1128-
- Born: 1104/05
- Died: 1132
- Spouse: Charles I, Count of Flanders; Hugh II, Count of Saint-Pol; Baldwin of Encre; Thierry, Count of Flanders
- Issue: Raoul of Saint-Pol; Guy of Saint-Pol; Elisabeth of Encre; Laurette of Flanders
- House: House of Clermont
- Father: Renaud II, Count of Clermont-en-Beauvaisis
- Mother: Adelaide, Countess of Vermandois

Margaret of Clermont (French: Marguerite; 1104/05 – 1132) was a countess consort of Flanders twice by marriage to Charles I, Count of Flanders and Thierry, Count of Flanders. She was ruling suo jure countess regnant of Amiens 1118–1132.

== Life ==
Her parents were Renaud II, Count of Clermont-en-Beauvaisis and his first wife, Adelaide, Countess of Vermandois (daughter of Herbert IV, Count of Vermandois).

Margaret was first married to Charles I, Count of Flanders in 1115. As a dowry, she received the county of Amiens. The marriage was brief and childless.

Later, c. 1128, Margaret married Hugh II, Count of Saint-Pol, they had two sons, Raoul, and Guy.

Her third husband was Baldwin of Encre. They had one daughter, Elisabeth (died after 1189) who later married Gautier III, Lord of Heilly.

Her fourth and final husband was Thierry, Count of Flanders. They had one daughter, Laurette of Flanders who, like her mother, had four husbands (Iwain, Count of Aalst, Henry II, Duke of Limburg; Raoul I of Vermandois, and Henry IV of Luxembourg. Laurette later retired to a nunnery where she died in 1170.

== Sources ==
- Galbert de Bruges (2013). The Murder, Betrayal, and Slaughter of the Glorious Charles, Count of Flanders. Translated by Rider, John Jeffrey. Yale University Press. ISBN 978-0-300-15230-2.
