= Stephen Harding =

English Catholic saint (c. 1060–1134)

Saint Stephen Harding O.Cist
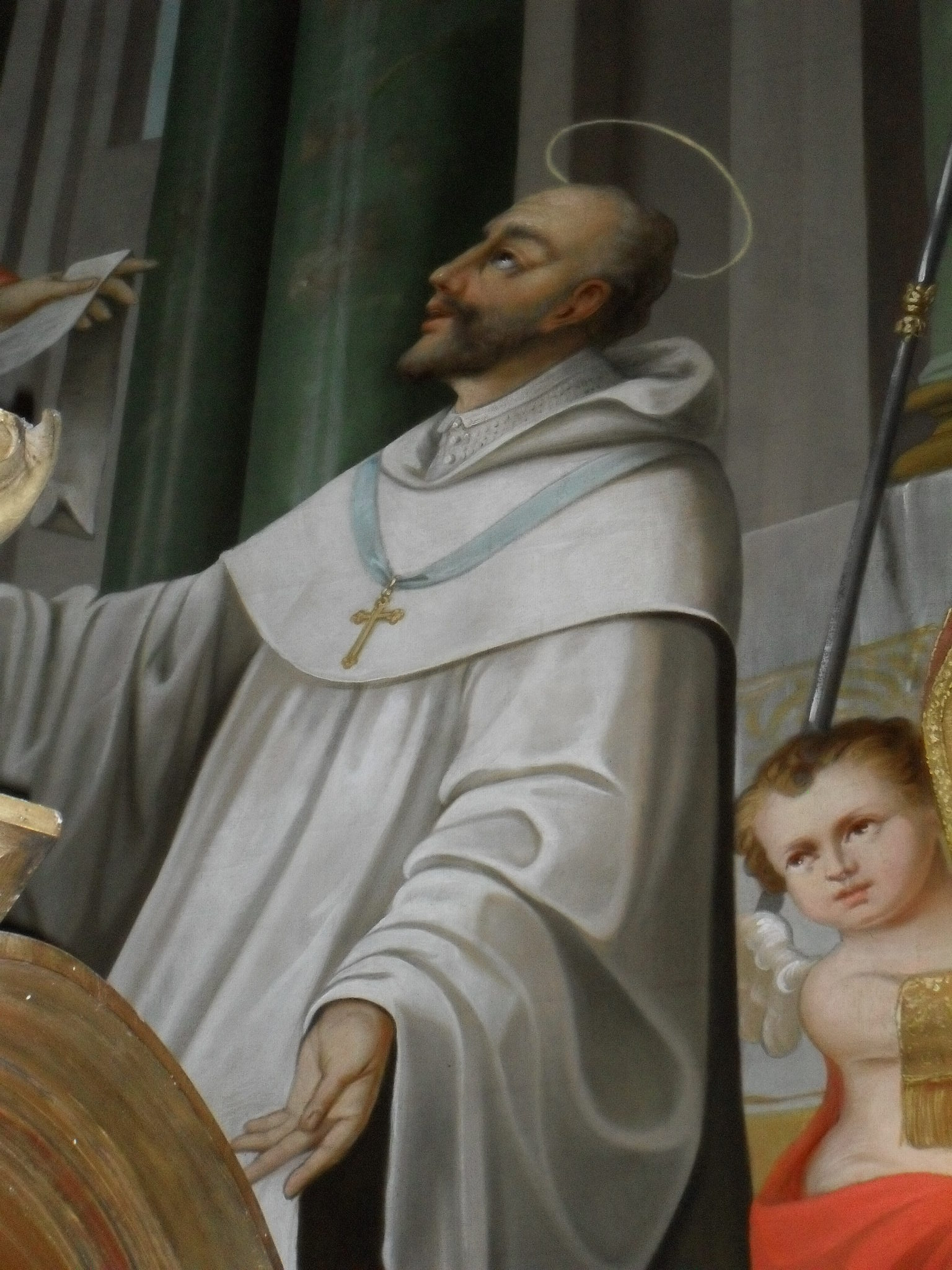
- Picture of Saint Stephen Harding in Apátistvánfalva, Hungary
- Born: c. 1050; Sherborne, Dorset, Kingdom of England
- Died: 28 March 1134 (aged 83–84); Cîteaux Abbey, Duchy of Burgundy
- Venerated in: Roman Catholic Church (Cistercian Order)
- Feast: 26 January (Solemnity of the Founders of Cîteaux)
- Attributes: Dressed in the Cistercian cowl, with miniature church model, holding abbot's crozier, holding the Carta Caritatis ("Charter of Charity"), a founding document for the Cistercian Order

Stephen Harding (French: Étienne Harding) (c. 1060 – 28 March 1134) was an English-born monk and abbot, who was one of the founders of the Cistercian Order. He is honoured as a saint in the Roman Catholic Church.

== Early life ==
Stephen was born in south-west England and, as a youth, spent time at the Sherborne Abbey in Dorset. He then travelled to Scotland and France. Afterward, Stephen went on a pilgrimage to Rome. Back in France, Stephen joined a monastery at Molesme, Burgundy region.

== Founding the Cistercian Order ==
In 1098, Stephen, along with Robert and Alberic, left Molesme and founded a new monastery in Cîteaux, France. Robert became the first abbot. After Robert was ordered back to Molesme by Pope Urban II, Alberic became abbot and served for nine years until his death.

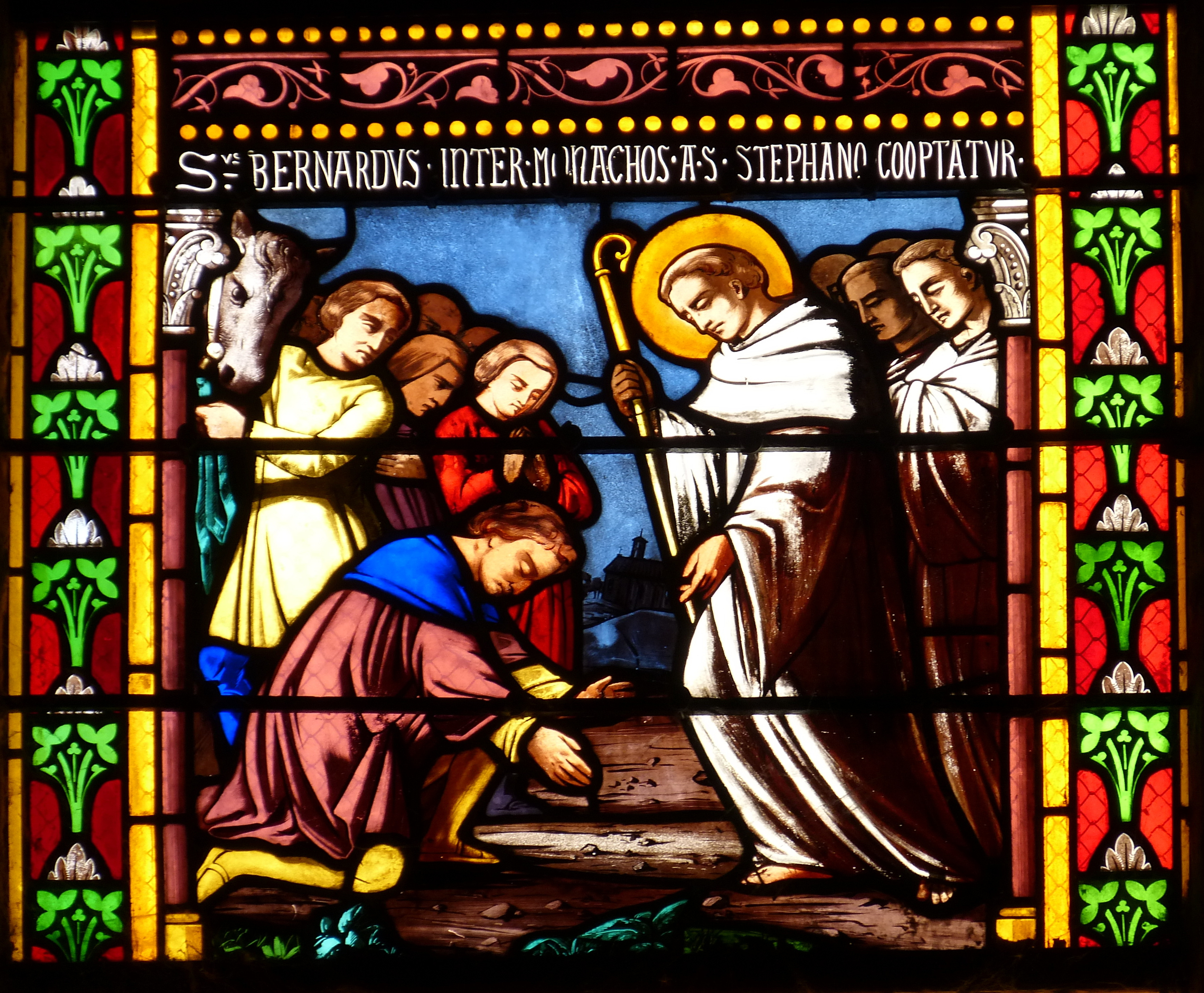
Bernard and Stephen

Stephen was the third abbot of Cîteaux. At first, under his administration, there was hardship, especially regarding the attainment of new members. Eventually, Bernard of Clairvaux entered the community, bringing with him thirty companions.

With Stephen and Bernard spearheading the order, many new Cistercian monasteries were founded. In 1119, Stephen received official approbation for the Carta Caritatis (Charter of Charity), an important document for the Cistercian Order, establishing its unifying principles. Many of his policies and decisions were influenced from his time with the Vallombrosians.

Stephen Harding served as abbot of Cîteaux for twenty-three years. While no single person is considered the founder of the Cistercian Order, the shape of Cistercian thought and its rapid growth in the 12th century were certainly due in some part to Harding's leadership. Insisting on simplicity in all aspects of monastic life, Stephen encouraged the severity of Cistercian architecture and the simple beauty of the Order's liturgy and music. He was an accomplished scribe; one of his greatest achievements is considered to be the Harding Bible. In 1133, he resigned as abbot because of poor eyesight. He died on 28 March 1134.

== Legacy ==
Veneration for Stephen began in the modern era. His feast was celebrated on 28 March until 1683 and then moved to 17 April, where it remained until the liturgical reforms following the Second Vatican Council, when it was moved back to 28 March. In a joint commemoration with Robert of Molesme and Alberic, the first two abbots of Cîteaux, the Cistercians and Benedictines today celebrate Stephen Harding's feast day on 26 January.

== Bibliography ==
- Claudio Stercal, Stephen Harding: A Biographical Sketch and Texts (Trappist, Kentucky: Cistercian Publications, 2008) (Cistercian Studies Series, 226).
