= Charles the Good =

Count of Flanders from 1119 to 1127

Blessed Charles the Good
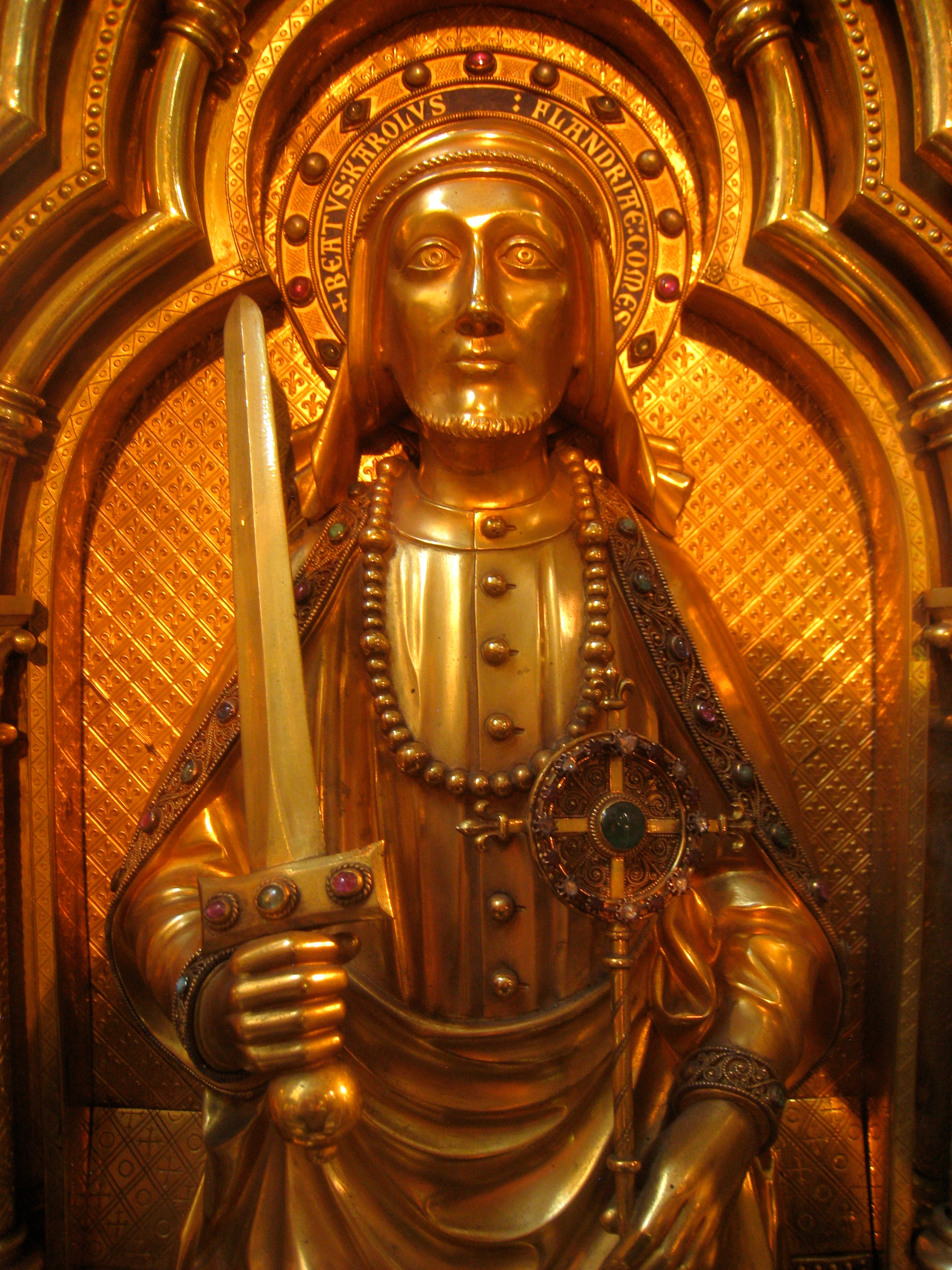
- Image of Charles I on his reliquary in the Sint-Salvatorskathedraal, Bruges, Belgium

Count and Martyr
- Born: c. 1084; Odense, Denmark
- Died: 2 March 1127; Bruges, County of Flanders (now Belgium)
- Venerated in: Roman Catholic Church
- Beatified: 9 February 1882 (confirmation of cultus) by Pope Leo XIII
- Feast: 2 March
- Attributes: sword

Charles the Good (1084 – 2 March 1127) was Count of Flanders from 1119 to 1127. His murder and its aftermath were chronicled by Galbert of Bruges. He was beatified by Pope Leo XIII in 1882 through cultus confirmation.

== Early life ==
Charles was born in Denmark, only son of the three children of King Canute IV (Saint Canute) and Adela of Flanders. His father was assassinated in Odense Cathedral in 1086, and Adela fled back to Flanders, taking the very young Charles with her but leaving her twin daughters Ingeborg and Cecilia in Denmark. Charles grew up at the comital court of his grandfather Robert I of Flanders and uncle Robert II of Flanders. In 1092 Adela went to southern Italy to marry Roger Borsa, duke of Apulia, leaving Charles in Flanders.

Charles travelled to the Holy Land in 1107 or 1108 with a fleet of English, Danish and Flemish crusaders. In 1124 he was offered the crown of the Kingdom of Jerusalem by a faction of the nobility opposed to King Baldwin II but refused, according to Galbert of Bruges, at the urging of his advisors, who feared that his departure would leave Flanders completely at the mercy of the Erembald clan.

== Countship of Flanders ==
In 1111 Robert II died, and Charles's cousin Baldwin VII of Flanders became count. Charles was a close adviser to the new count, who was several years younger than him. Around 1118, the count arranged Charles's marriage to Margaret of Clermont, the heiress of the count of Amiens, and daughter of Renaud II, Count of Clermont. The childless count Baldwin VII was wounded fighting at the Battle of Bures-en-Brai in September 1118, and he designated Charles as his successor before he died on 17 July 1119.

In 1125, he was also considered a candidate for the election of King of the Romans after the death of Henry V, but rejected the offer. During the famine that struck Flanders in that same year, Charles ordered legumes to be planted on his own estates and given away to the starving. He often stated, according to Galbert of Bruges, that it was better for the rich of Flanders to drink only water than for a single poor person to die of starvation. He distributed bread to the poor en masse and also launched a draconian crackdown against the very common business practice of buying up and hoarding grain and other food supplies during famine to drastically drive up the price and only much later selling it off at an enormous profit. For example, Charles expelled all the Jews from Flanders, attributing allegedly similar activities by Jewish merchants as a cause of additional suffering. Meanwhile, at the urging of his advisers, the count launched legal proceedings to reduce the extremely wealthy, politically connected, and demonstrably non-Jewish Erembald family, who were heavily engaged in these same disreputable business activities and many others like them, to the status of serfs. As a result, Bertulf, the head of the Erembald family, a Roman Catholic priest and provost of the Church of St. Donatian, masterminded a regime change conspiracy to assassinate Charles, replace him with his more pliable kinsman William of Ypres, and execute all of the Erembald family's opponents among the Count's advisors.

== Death ==
On the morning of 2 March 1127 Charles was kneeling in prayer with his outstretched hand filled with coins in order to give alms to passing poor people inside the church of St. Donatian. During Mass, a group of knights answering to the Erembald family entered the church and hacked Charles to death with broadswords. The murder of the popular count was deemed brutal and sacrilegious, provoking widespread public outrage, and he was almost immediately regarded popularly as a martyr and saint, although not formally beatified until 1882. (Note: At the Petit Palais Museum in Paris there is a remarkable painting of his funeral by the Belgian artist Jan van Beers (1852–1927).) The Erembalds, who had planned and carried out the murder of Charles, were besieged inside the comital castle of Bruges by the enraged nobles and commoners of Bruges and Ghent. All the conspirators were defeated, captured, and tortured to death. King Louis VI of France, who had supported the uprising against the Erembalds, then used his influence to select William Clito of the House of Normandy as the next count of Flanders.

== Sources ==
- Aird, William M. (2008). Robert Curthose, Duke of Normandy: C. 1050–1134. The Boydell Press.
- Davies, Ralph Henry Carless (1997). King Stephen. Routledge.
- Deutsch, Gotthard; Bloch, Armand (1906). "Ghent". Jewish Encyclopedia.
- Galbert of Bruges (2013). The Murder, Betrayal, and Slaughter of the Glorious Charles, Count of Flanders. Translated by Rider, Jeff. Yale University Press.
- Hundahl, Kerstin; Kjær, Lars; Lund, Niels, eds. (2016). Denmark and Europe in the Middle Ages, C.1000–1525: Essays in Honour of Professor Michael H. Gelting. Routledge.
- Nicholas, David (1992). Medieval Flanders. Longman.
- Paul, Nicholas L. (2012). To Follow in Their Footsteps: The Crusades and Family Memory in the High Middle Ages. Cornell University Press. ISBN 9780801450976.
- Riley-Smith, Jonathan (1997). The First Crusaders, 1095–1131. Cambridge University Press.
- van Ryckeghem, Willy (2019). The Many Enemies of Charles the Good, PDF on academia.edu.org

Preceded by Baldwin VII	Count of Flanders; 1119–1127	Succeeded by William
