= Auberives-sur-Varèze =

- Commune
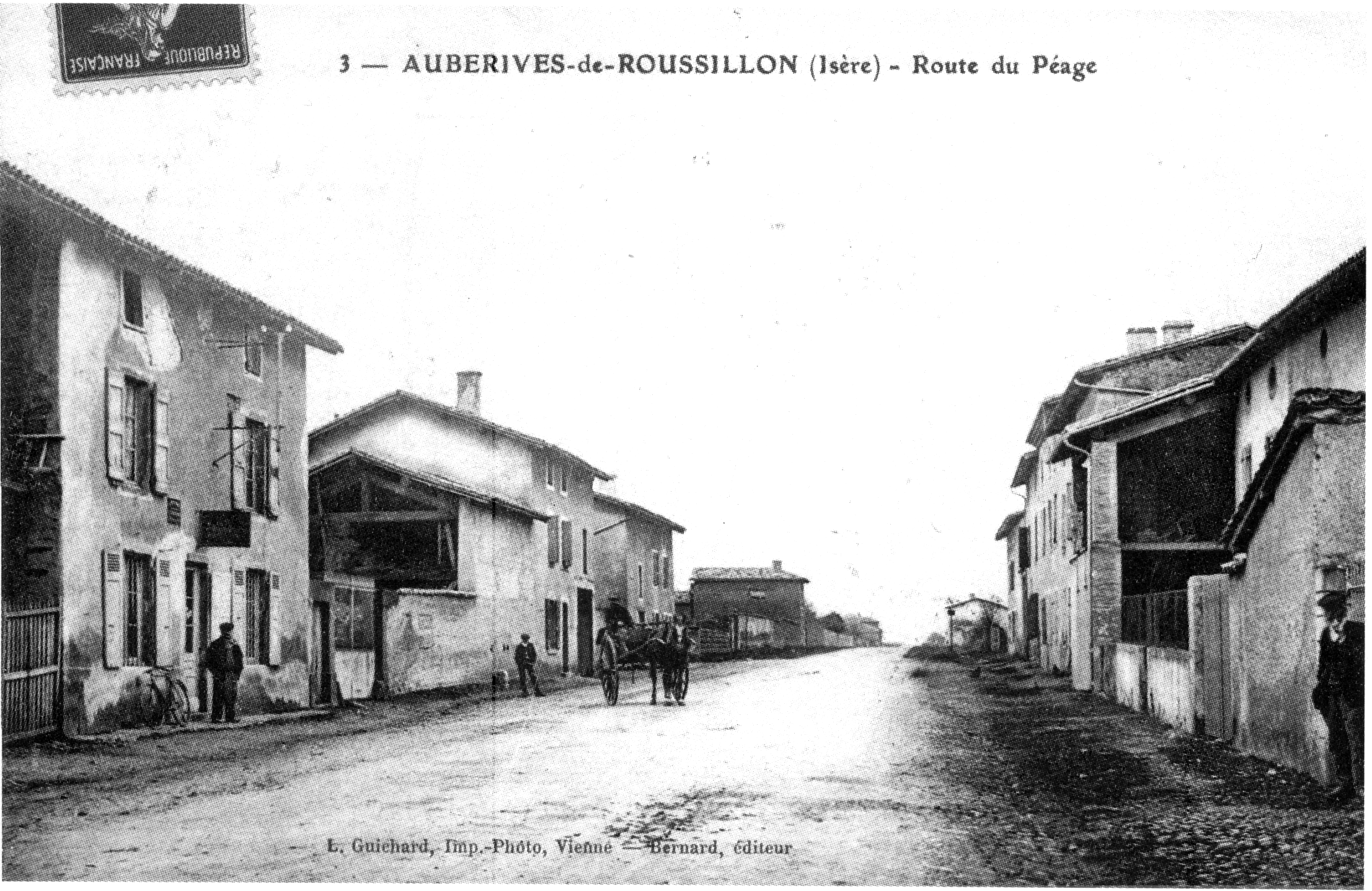
- A toll road in 1910
- Location of Auberives-sur-Varèze
- Location within France Location within Auvergne-Rhône-Alpes
- Coordinates: 45°25′31″N 4°49′08″E
- Country: France
- Region: Auvergne-Rhône-Alpes
- Department: Isère
- Arrondissement: Vienne
- Canton: Vienne-2
- Intercommunality: Entre Bièvre et Rhône

Government
  - Mayor (2022–2026): Nelly Claret
- Area^{1}: 7.05 km^{2} (2.72 sq mi)
- Highest elevation: 256 m (840 ft)
- Lowest elevation: 169 m (554 ft)
- Population (2023): 1,501
  - Density: 213/km^{2} (551/sq mi)
- Time zone: UTC+01:00 (CET)
  - Summer (DST): UTC+02:00 (CEST)
- INSEE/Postal code: 38019 /38550
- ^{1} French Land Register data, which excludes lakes, ponds, glaciers > 1 km^{2} (0.386 sq mi or 247 acres) and river estuaries.

Auberives-sur-Varèze (French pronunciation: [obʁiv syʁ vaʁɛz]) is a commune in the Isère department in the Auvergne-Rhône-Alpes region of south-eastern France.

== Geography ==
Auberives-sur-Varèze is located some 14 km south by south-west of Vienne and 6 km north-east of Saint-Maurice-l'Exil. Access to the commune is by Route nationale 7 from Vienne in the north which passes through the length of the commune and the town before continuing south to Le Péage-de-Roussillon. The D37 road comes from Cheyssieu in the east passing through the commune north of the village and continuing to Saint-Prim in the north-west. The A7 autoroute (E15) also passes through the east of the commune but there is no exit in or near the commune. There is a belt of forest through the centre of the commune just north of the town while the rest of the commune is farmland apart from the large residential area of the town.

The Varèze river flows through the centre of the commune from east to west to join the Rhône at Saint-Alban-du-Rhône. The Canal du Moulin branches from the Varèze in the east of the commune and continues west south of and parallel to it. The Suzon river flows from the west north of the Varèze and joins it in the east of the commune.

== History ==
The history of Auberives is very old as for the neighbouring communes in the north of the canton. The name Auberives comes from the Latin Ripa Alba meaning "White Shore" due to the presence in the soil of kaolin which was formerly used by potters.

The oldest vestige is the "Great Borne": a boulder rolled by glaciers to the crossroads of the communes of Roussillon at Assieu, and Auberives at Ville on Anjou.

In the 11th century the area was covered with a vast forest populated mostly by deer and wild boar. In the 12th century there was wolf hunting which activity would have given its name to the forest of Louze. At the end of the 11th century the Lord of Auberives was a knight, vassal of Roussillon, called Angérius. At the beginning of the 15th century the Lord of Auberives was Louis II of Chalon-Arlay, Prince of Orange, and an ally of the Duke of Burgundy. At the time of the Battle of Anthon on 11 June 1430, the castle was besieged and dismantled by Raoul de Gaucourt, governor of Dauphiné. Since then the castle has been a ruin. A remaining section of wall partially encloses the current cemetery.

Auberives has carried many names: Auberives de Vienne, Auberives de Roussillon, and finally Auberives-sur-Varèze from the name of the river.

Louis Mandrin, the smuggler, passed through while moving around the region. He had a hideout at Reventin (4 km away).

With a surface of 704 hectares and despite the strong decrease in the number of farmers, Auberives has always been a predominantly agricultural commune with the meadows and woods of the Varèze, significant areas of fruit trees, and with a few fields preserving traditional cultures.

== Administration ==
List of Successive Mayors

From	To	Name
2001	2020	Nicole Bernard
2020	2022	Dorothée Zaborowski
2022	incumbent	Nelly Claret

== Demography ==
The inhabitants of the commune are known as Auberivois or Auberivoises in French.

Historical population

Year	Pop.	±% p.a.
1800	357	—
1806	499	+5.74%
1821	610	+1.35%
1831	694	+1.30%
1836	753	+1.65%
1841	712	−1.11%
1846	750	+1.05%
1851	776	+0.68%
1856	670	−2.89%
1861	650	−0.60%
1866	664	+0.43%
1872	616	−1.24%
1876	619	+0.12%
1881	557	−2.09%
1886	569	+0.43%
1891	535	−1.22%
1896	532	−0.11%
1901	530	−0.08%

Year	Pop.	±% p.a.
1906	514	−0.61%
1911	482	−1.28%
1921	466	−0.34%
1926	432	−1.50%
1931	450	+0.82%
1936	460	+0.44%
1946	493	+0.70%
1954	506	+0.33%
1962	498	−0.20%
1968	548	+1.61%
1975	651	+2.49%
1982	710	+1.25%
1990	896	+2.95%
1999	1,159	+2.90%
2007	1,418	+2.55%
2012	1,504	+1.18%
2017	1,484	−0.27%
2023	1,501	+0.19%

Source: EHESS and INSEE

== Sites and monuments ==
- A Church from the 19th century

== See also ==
- Communes of the Isère department
