= Assieu =

- Commune
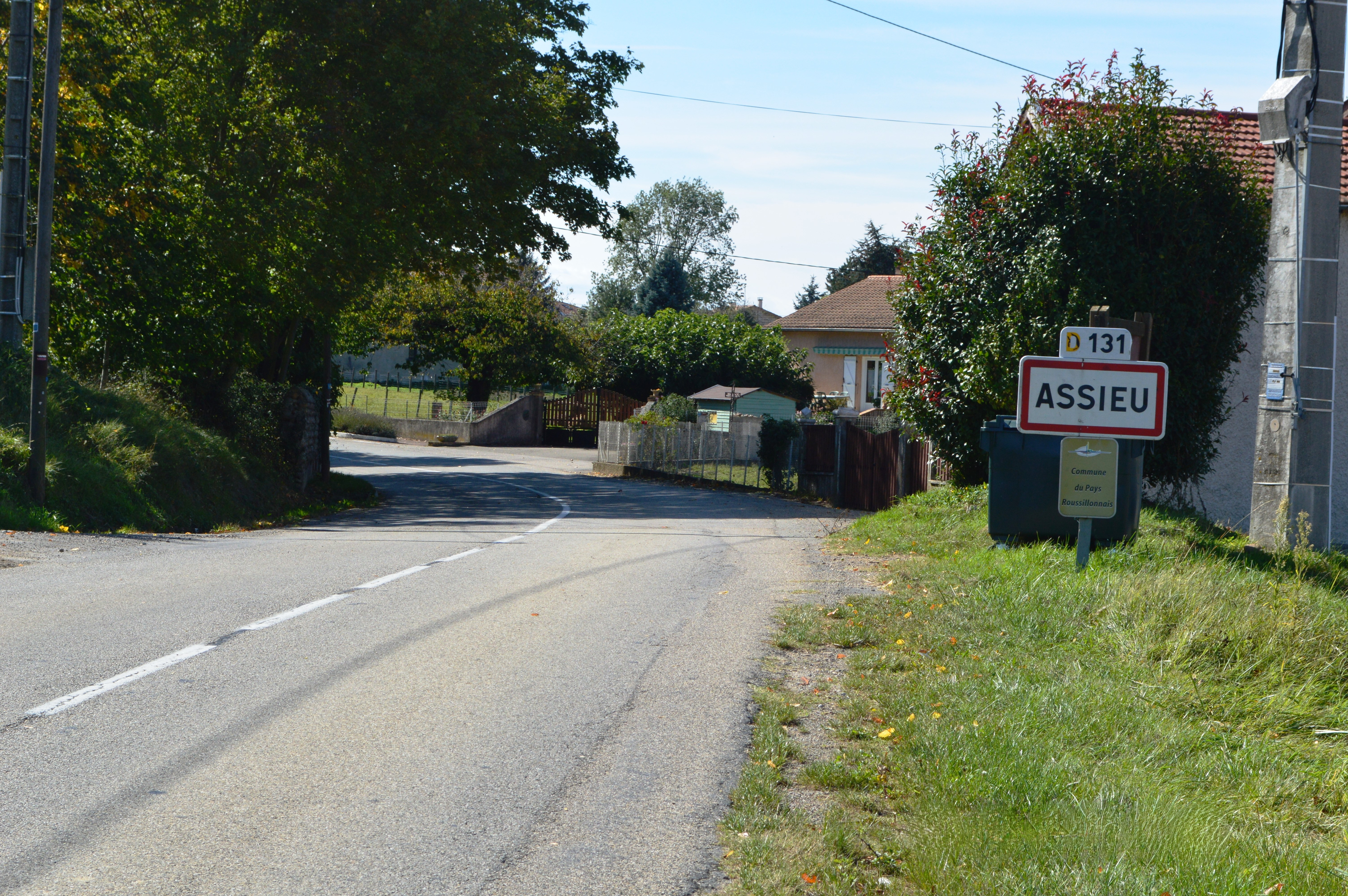
- The road into Assieu

- Coat of arms
- Location of Assieu
- Location within France Location within Auvergne-Rhône-Alpes
- Coordinates: 45°24′29″N 4°52′07″E
- Country: France
- Region: Auvergne-Rhône-Alpes
- Department: Isère
- Arrondissement: Vienne
- Canton: Vienne-2
- Intercommunality: Entre Bièvre et Rhône

Government
  - Mayor (2020–2026): Jean-Michel Ségui
- Area^{1}: 12.34 km^{2} (4.76 sq mi)
- Highest elevation: 407 m (1,335 ft)
- Lowest elevation: 220 m (720 ft)
- Population (2023): 1,726
  - Density: 139.9/km^{2} (362.3/sq mi)
- Time zone: UTC+01:00 (CET)
  - Summer (DST): UTC+02:00 (CEST)
- INSEE/Postal code: 38017 /38150
- ^{1} French Land Register data, which excludes lakes, ponds, glaciers > 1 km^{2} (0.386 sq mi or 247 acres) and river estuaries.

Assieu (French pronunciation: [asjø]) is a commune in the Isère department in the Auvergne-Rhône-Alpes region of south-eastern France.

== Geography ==
Assieu is located some 30 km south by south-east of Givors and 8 km east by north-east of Saint-Maurice-l'Exil. Access to the commune is by the D131 road from the D134 in the south passing north then east in the commune to the town then north and continuing north-west to Route nationale 7. Apart from the town there is the village of La Charinaz in the east and Les Bruyeres in the west. The commune has large forests in the east as well as one in the west with significant residential areas and the rest of the land farmland.

The Vareze river forms the northern border and gathers many tributaries rising in the commune as it flows west to join the Rhône at Saint-Alban-du-Rhône.

=== Heraldry ===
Arms of Assieu	Blazon: Azure, a fox rampant of Or, in chief the same charged with three dolphins of Azure, crested, finned, and eyebrowed in Gules.

== Administration ==
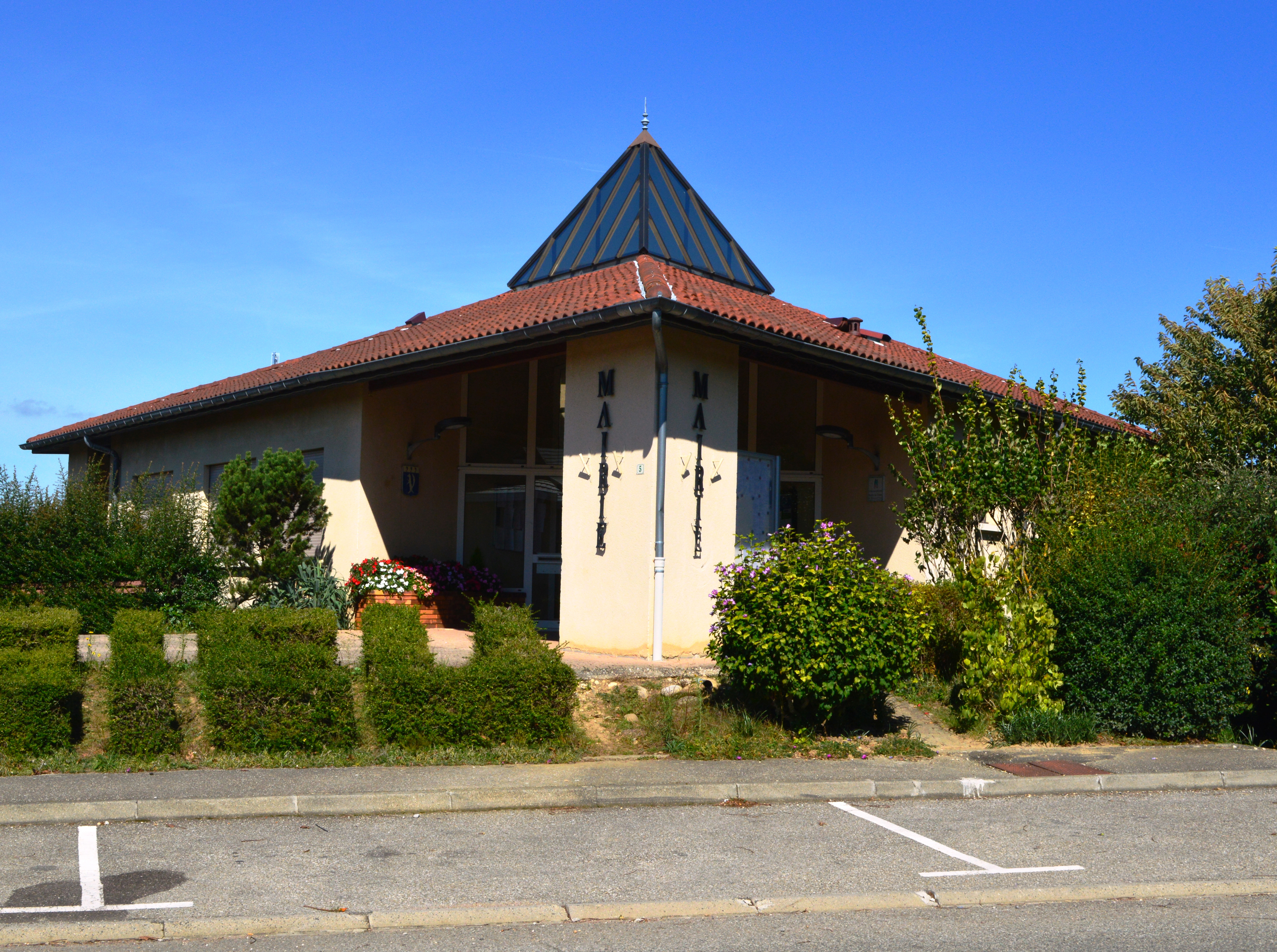
The Town Hall

List of Successive Mayors

From	To	Name
2001	2014	Luc Monin
2014	2026	Jean-Michel Ségui

== Demography ==
The inhabitants of the commune are known as Assieutois or Assieutoises in French.

Historical population

Year	Pop.	±% p.a.
1793	621	—
1821	423	−1.36%
1846	731	+2.21%
1872	700	−0.17%
1901	559	−0.77%
1926	507	−0.39%
1946	455	−0.54%
1962	521	+0.85%
1968	514	−0.23%

Year	Pop.	±% p.a.
1975	567	+1.41%
1982	612	+1.10%
1990	768	+2.88%
1999	889	+1.64%
2007	1,257	+4.42%
2012	1,368	+1.71%
2017	1,472	+1.48%
2023	1,726	+2.69%

Source: EHESS and INSEE

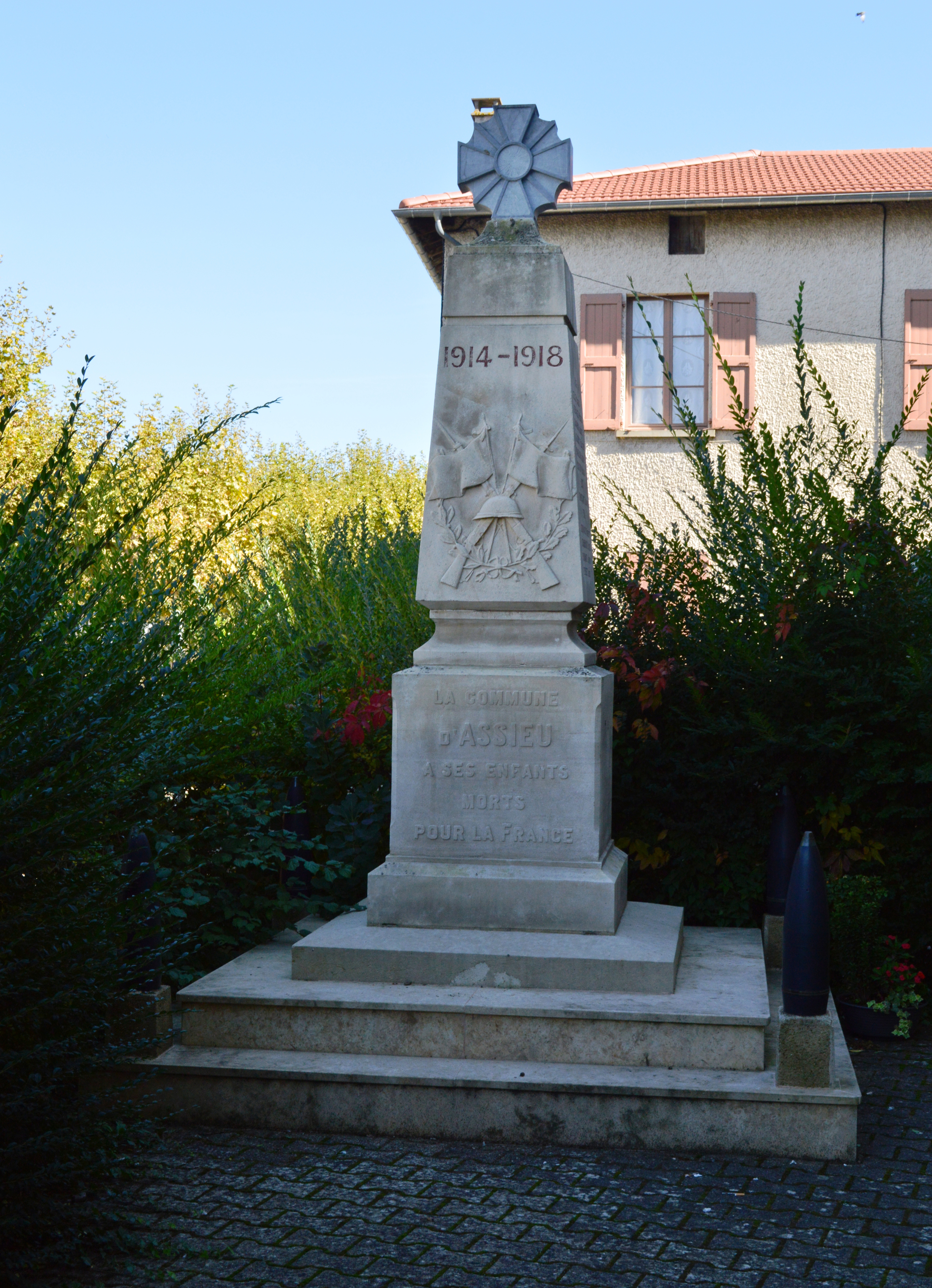
Assieu War Memorial

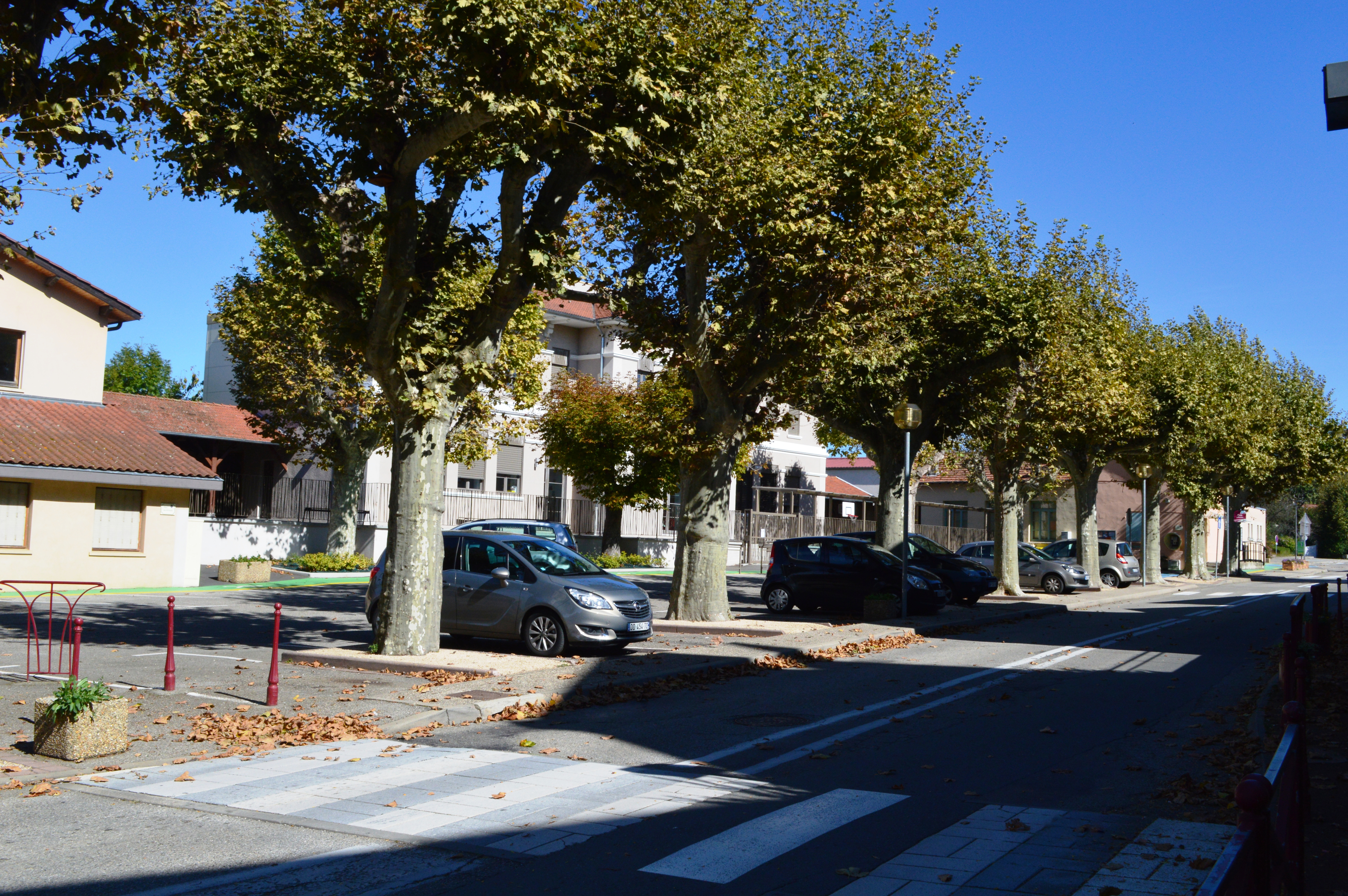
A street in Assieu

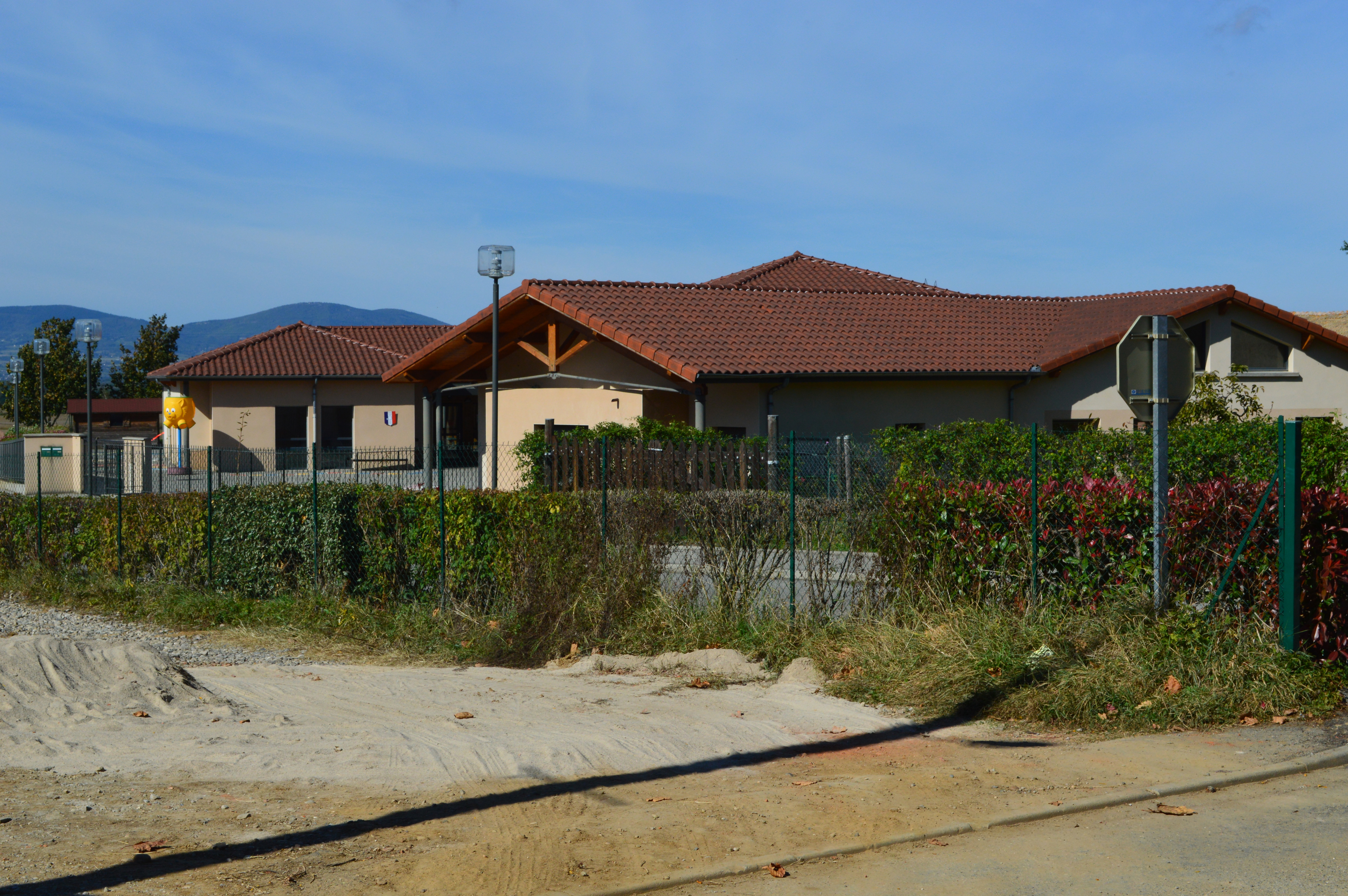
Assieu School

== Sites and monuments ==
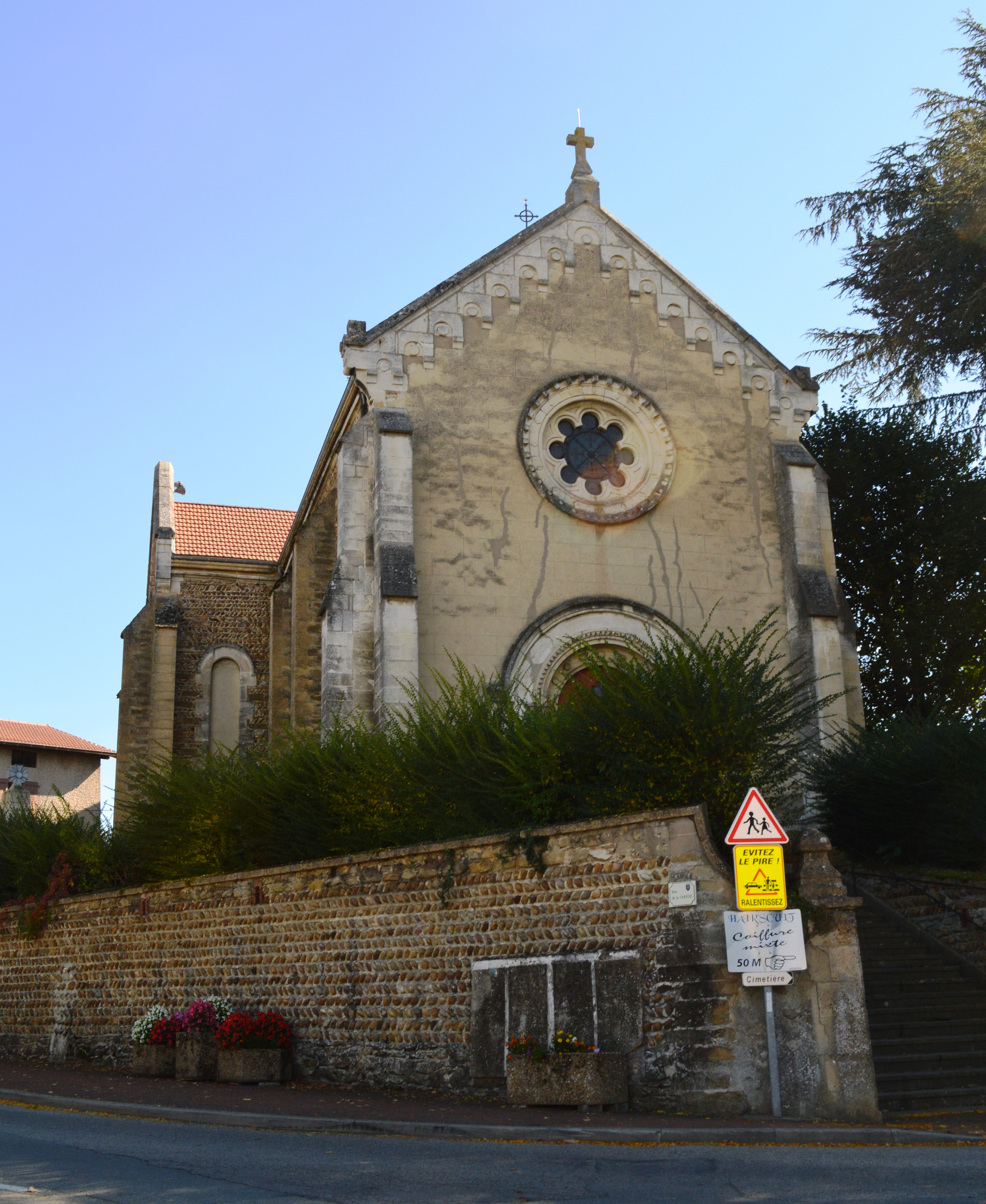
Assieu Church

- Chateau Juveneton
- Chateau Richoux
- Church from the 19th century

== See also ==
- Communes of the Isère department
