= Saint-Alban Nuclear Power Plant =

Nuclear power plant in France

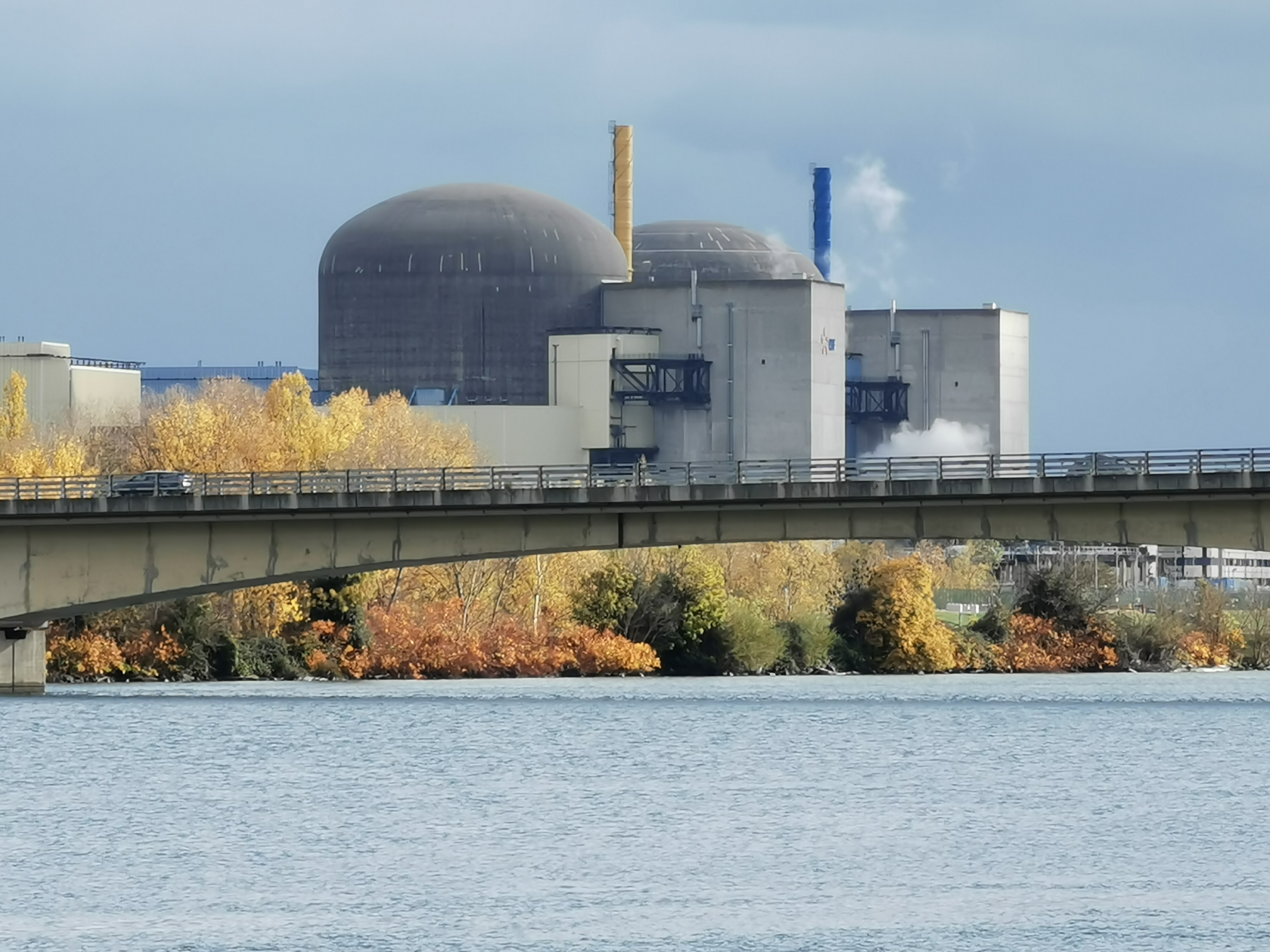
- Saint-Alban nuclear power plant from across the Rhône
- Official name: Centrale nucléaire de Saint-Alban
- Country: France
- Location: Saint-Alban-du-Rhône, Isère, Auvergne-Rhône-Alpes
- Coordinates: 45°24′16″N 4°45′19″E
- Status: Operational
- Construction began: Unit 1: 29 January 1979; Unit 2: 31 July 1979
- Commission date: Unit 1: 1 May 1986; 38 years ago Unit 2: 1 March 1987; 38 years ago
- Owner: EDF
- Operator: EDF
- Employees: 1,242 (2017)

Nuclear power station
- Reactor type: PWR
- Reactor supplier: Framatome
- Cooling source: Rhône River
- Thermal capacity: 2 × 3817 MW_{th}

Power generation
- Units operational: 2 × 1335 MW
- Make and model: P4 REP 1300
- Nameplate capacity: 2670 MW
- Capacity factor: 61.54% (2017); 67.90% (lifetime)
- Annual net output: 14,394 GWh (2017)

External links
- Website: Centrale nucléaire de Saint-Alban
- Commons: Related media on Commons

The Saint-Alban nuclear power plant is located on the Rhone river, in the Isère department 50 km downstream from Lyon in the communes of Saint-Alban-du-Rhône and Saint-Maurice-l'Exil.

== Description ==
The power station uses water from the Rhone river to cool its two 1,300 MW reactors and employs 670 people.

== Type of reactors ==
The following types of reactors are installed:

=== Reactor units ===
Reactor Unit	Type	Average Output	Rated Power	Began construction	Finish construction	Commercial operation
St.Alban-1	PWR	1381 MW	1335 MW	Jan 1979	Aug 1985	May 1986
St.Alban-2	PWR	1381 MW	1335 MW	July 1979	July 1986	March 1987

== Seismological risk ==
According to WENRA, EDF has prepared a plan in case of an earthquake, however other ASN documents from 2002 there may be some anomalies regarding the remote control and which may put into question the correct functioning of certain elements following an earthquake.

== 2003 heatwave ==
Following extremely high temperatures in July 2003 average water temperature rose above the limit authorised by the nuclear safety authorities for a period of 4 hours.

== Fire risk ==
According to the 2007 ASN annual report recommendations were made to the operator to improve the security of the control room.

== See also ==
- List of nuclear reactors - France

== Aerial view ==
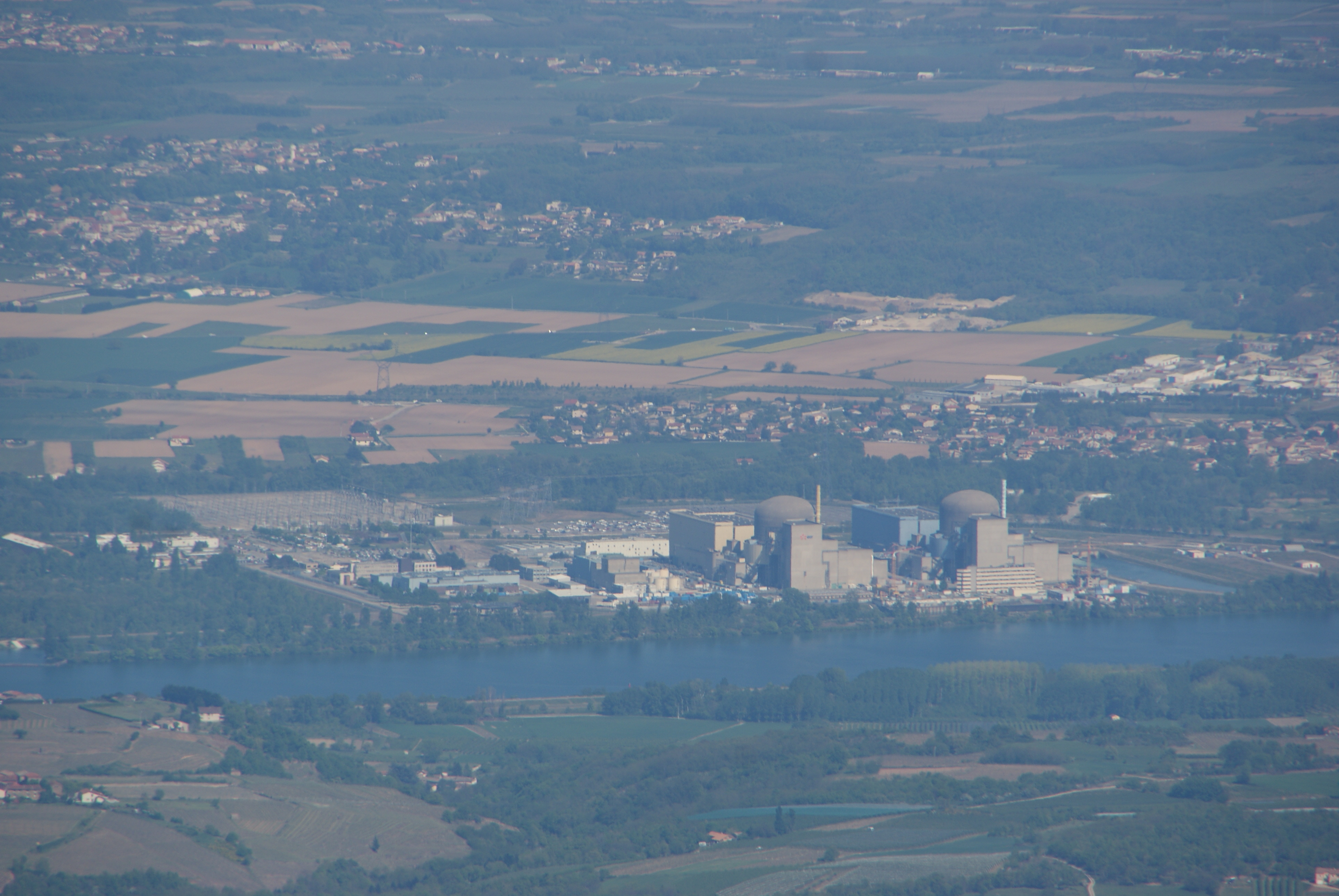
Aerial view
