= Estrablin =

- Commune
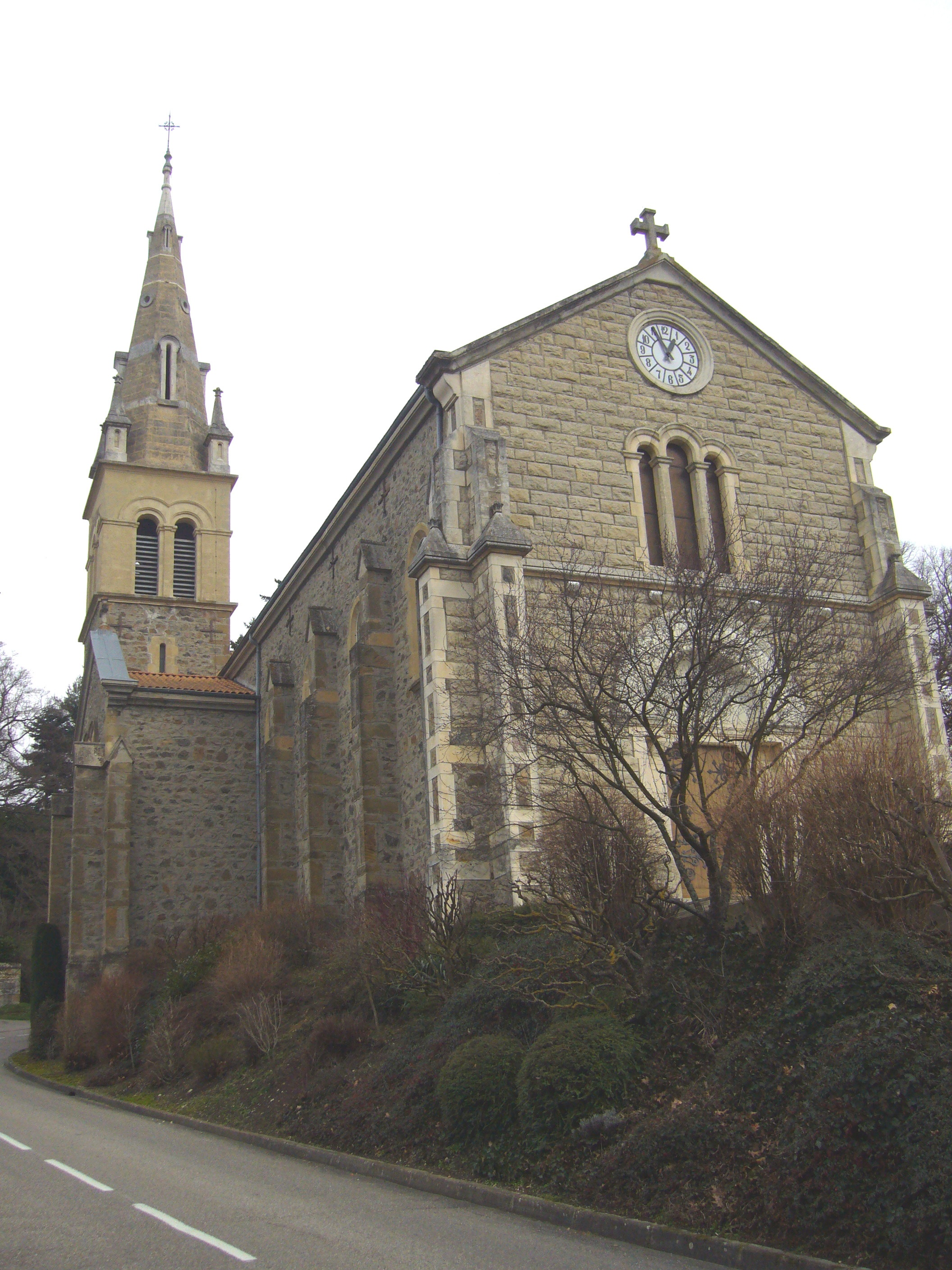
- The church of Estrablin
- Location of Estrablin
- Location within France Location within Auvergne-Rhône-Alpes
- Coordinates: 45°31′03″N 4°57′54″E
- Country: France
- Region: Auvergne-Rhône-Alpes
- Department: Isère
- Arrondissement: Vienne
- Canton: Vienne-2
- Intercommunality: CA Vienne Condrieu

Government
  - Mayor (2020–2026): Denis Peillot
- Area^{1}: 20.69 km^{2} (7.99 sq mi)
- Highest elevation: 352 m (1,155 ft)
- Lowest elevation: 186 m (610 ft)
- Population (2023): 3,677
  - Density: 177.7/km^{2} (460.3/sq mi)
- Time zone: UTC+01:00 (CET)
  - Summer (DST): UTC+02:00 (CEST)
- INSEE/Postal code: 38157 /38780
- ^{1} French Land Register data, which excludes lakes, ponds, glaciers > 1 km^{2} (0.386 sq mi or 247 acres) and river estuaries.

Estrablin (French pronunciation: [ɛstʁablɛ̃]) is a commune in the Isère department in southeastern France. Located near Vienne (7 km) and Lyon (30 km), Estrablin is attractive for its calm and its rural atmosphere. The name of the town is believed to be derived from the French word defining aspens (tremble), a species of poplar trees locally present in large quantities, especially along the rivers.

== History ==
=== Antiquity ===
Located near the Gallo-Roman city of Vienne, Estrablin was long occupied and exploited by men. Thus, the Roman times have left many traces. First, in Roman times, Estrablin, together with Eyzin-Pinet, was the main source of water supply for the city of Vienne. Indeed, four of the eleven aqueducts bringing water in Vienne came from the territory of the current commune of Estrablin. Three of these aqueducts took their water from the aquifer of the Gère river (two in the hamlet of Gemens, one in the hamlet of Gabetière). The last aqueducts took its water directly in the Suze stream thanks to a reservoir dam that the Romans had built between the hamlet of Malissol upstream, and the Gère river, downstream.

The discovery of ancient objects on the territory of Estrablin also attests of a former occupation. Thus, during the development of the D41 Department Road in 1837 was discovered, in the hamlet of La Coupe, an earthenware vase containing more than 1,000 Roman coins dating from the third and fourth centuries. Unfortunately, all of these coins disappeared, probably shared between the workers behind the discovery.

=== Medieval times and Renaissance ===
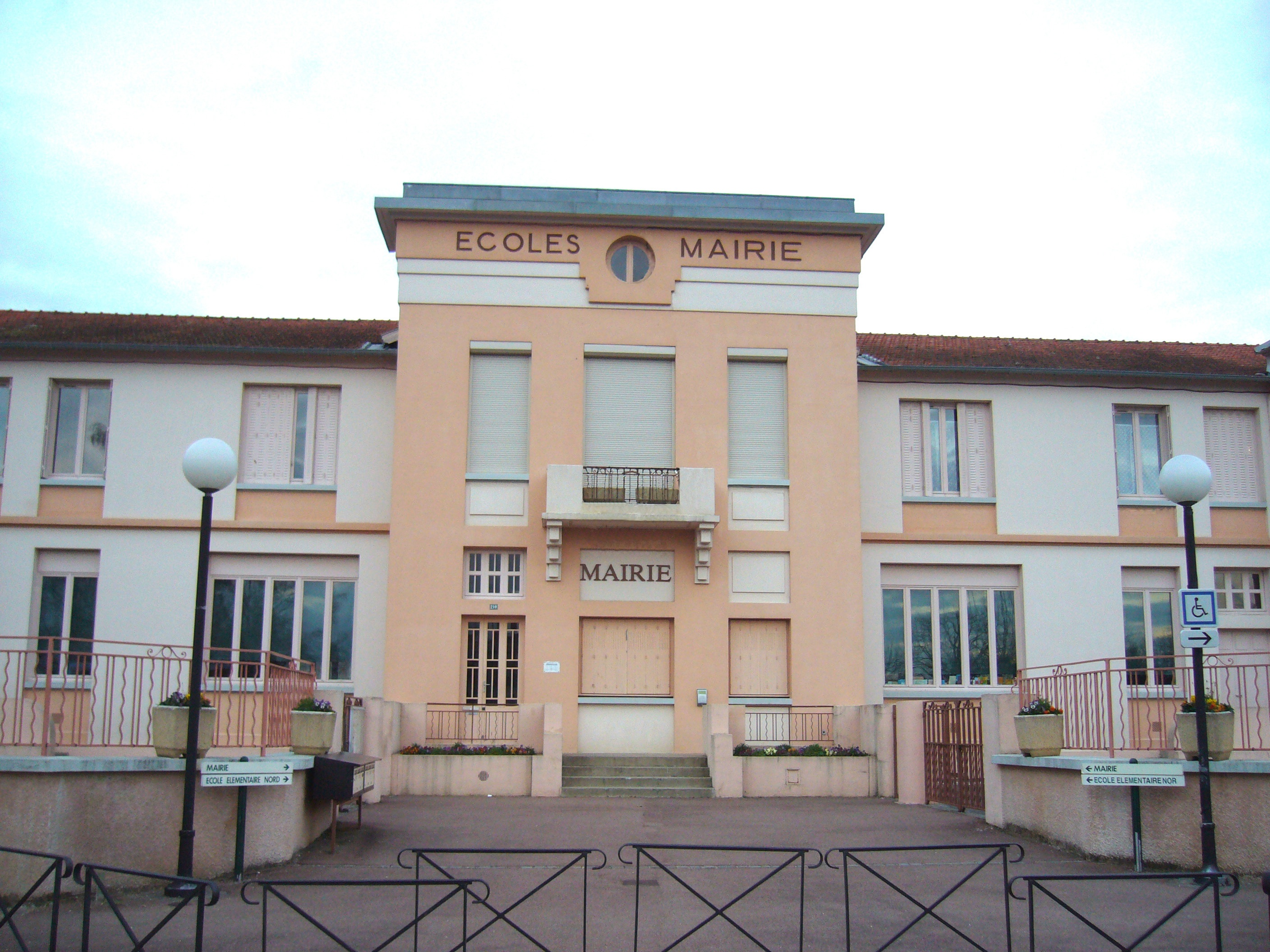
The town hall and public school of Estrablin, built in 1935

The current commune of Estrablin was born from the union of two catholic parishes: Estrablin and Gemens. The hamlet of Gemens, thanks to its proximity with Vienne, experienced great development in the fourteenth and fifteenth centuries. Indeed, various industries settled on the banks of the Gère river: grain mills, beaters hemp, paper factories... We know that in 1452, Louis the Dauphin, future Louis XI of France, bequeathed the territory of Gemens (then called Gemma in medieval French) to one of his valets, a man named Montaigu.

Other archives tell us that in 1575, a major paper factory belonging to Jean-Jacques Gabet was operating in Gemens, supplying many printing houses of Vienne and even Lyon. From the eighteenth century, the industries of Gemens gradually disappeared and, in 1721, the parish was removed and attached to that of Estrablin. The priest of Estrablin then also became priest of Gemens.

Jean-Jacques Gabet, of whom we mentioned the name earlier, was an important figure of the Renaissance in Estrablin. Born in Châtonnay and Judge in the Court of Vienne, Gabet lived in a large fortified mansion called Gabetière and located in the parish of Estrablin. Committed support of the Protestant Reformation, Gabet was a locally prominent Huguenot involved in the religious wars of the sixteenth century. Having taken an active part in the Amboise conspiracy, Gabet participated, along with the Baron des Adrets, in the siege of Vienne which led to the first Protestant sermon in the Diocese of Vienne (January 1562).

=== Modern times ===
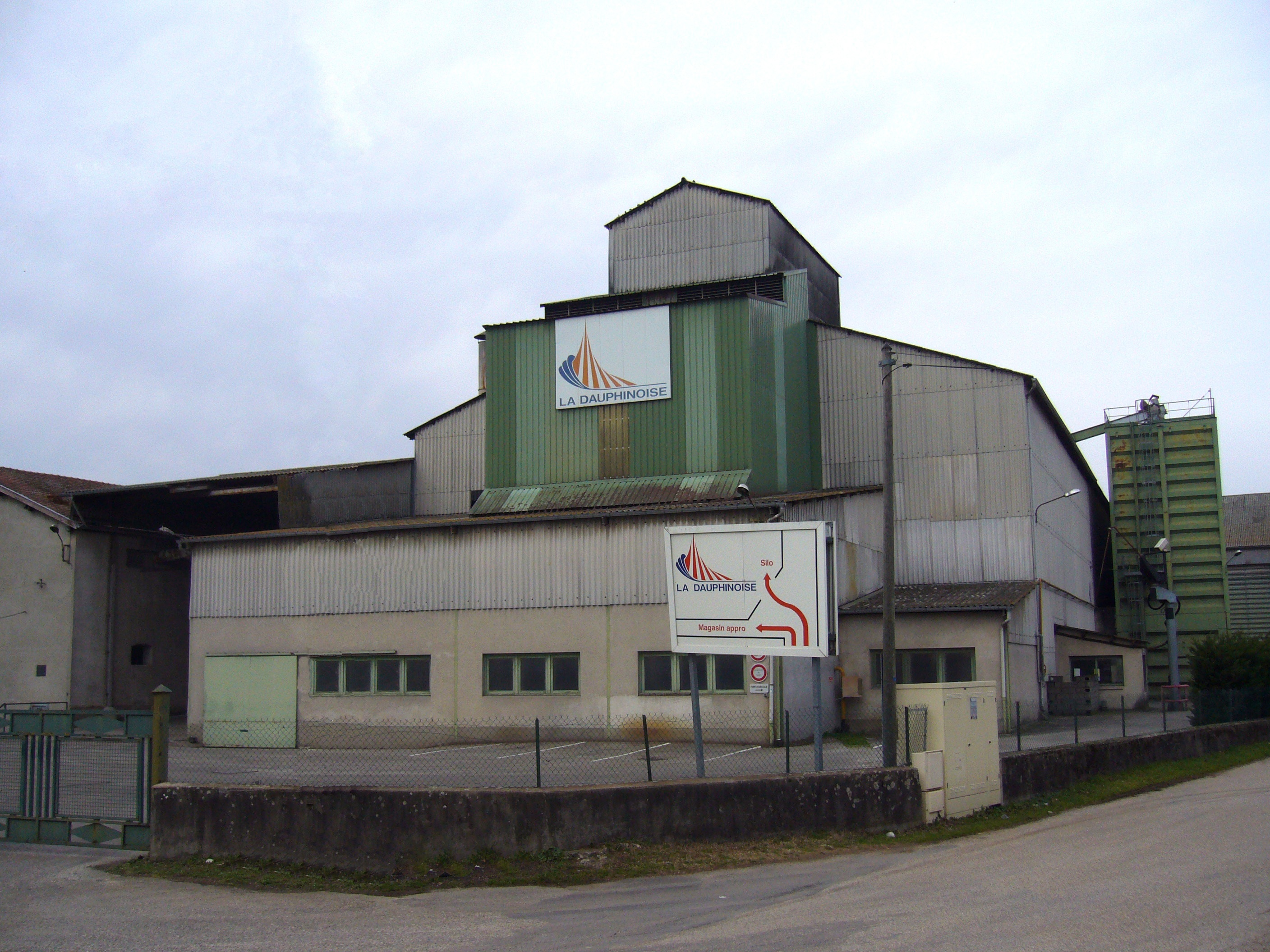
Grain storage facility in the hamlet of La Craz

In 1853, Jean Mayoud was appointed mayor of Estrablin and launched a major campaign to improve the few roads and many pathways of the commune. Some bridges were constructed and several pathways enlarged, gradually turning into roads.

1867 was a milestone for the commune of Estrablin as it lost a significant part of its territory to the newly established commune of Pont-Évêque, whose creation was decided by the law of 20 July 1867. The area of Estrablin shifted from 2215 to 2069 hectares. In 1877, the new church was built to replace the old medieval church of which some ruins remain in the cemetery.

Estrablin is connected to the grid in 1926 and a new town hall, which also houses the local school, was built in 1935.

The economic activity of the commune changed a lot between the nineteenth and twentieth centuries. Indeed, agriculture still occupies an important place in the 1980s when more than 66% of the territory of Estrablin dedicated to this activity. The main productions of the commune are grains (wheat, corn ...) and cattle. Wine growing used to be a major activity but declined since the 1930s and has now almost completely disappeared. The permanent grasslands are still very widespread (16% of the territory).

Cereal production has been expanding dramatically with the setup, in 1962, of a large grain storage facility in the hamlet of La Craz. Acquired in 1961 by a regional agricultural cooperative (known as La Dauphinoise), this particular land was formerly occupied by a candle factory. The previous manufacturing plant, which employed for decades large numbers of workers from the village, was destroyed in 1960 by fire. The current grain storage facilities can contain up to 23,000 tonnes of cereals. Therefore, they are supplied by farmers from various villages of the region and not only by farmers of Estrablin.

The population of the commune varied significantly over the last two centuries. While there were 1,308 inhabitants in 1881, there were only 967 left in 1962, which means 26% less. This desertification was mainly due to the industrialization of the towns of Vienne and Pont-Eveque which required abundant labor.

However, since 1962, the population is increasing and the change observed between 1962 and 1982, from 967 to 2,738 inhabitants, demonstrates a considerable increase in such a short period of time. Recent demographic developments comes largely from the fact that Estrablin tends to become a residential suburb of Vienne. The rural atmosphere of Estrablin attracts new inhabitants and numerous individual houses were built all over the commune's territory, mainly in the 1970s and 1980s.

== Administration ==
=== Mayors ===
Mayor	Term start	Term end	Party
Auguste Ronjat	1901	1925	Independent
Louis Moussier	1925	1934	Independent
Pierre Mondon	1934	1944	Centre-right
Albert Badin	1944	1945	Centre-left
Louis Perroud	1945	1946	Independent
Alexandre Déroux Dauphin	1946	1953	Centre-right
Edmond de Martène	1953	1959	Independent
Alexandre Déroux Dauphin	1959	1963	Centre-right
Pierre Lacroix	1963	1977	Centre-right
Roger Porcheron	1977	2014	Socialist Party
Sylvain Laignel	2014	incumbent	Socialist Party

== Population ==
The inhabitants of Estrablin are called Estrablinois in French.

Historical population

Year	Pop.	±% p.a.
1793	557	—
1800	327	−7.33%
1806	699	+13.50%
1821	869	+1.46%
1831	972	+1.13%
1836	1,099	+2.49%
1841	1,228	+2.24%
1846	1,281	+0.85%
1851	1,390	+1.65%
1856	1,605	+2.92%
1861	1,751	+1.76%
1866	1,906	+1.71%
1872	1,316	−5.99%
1876	1,264	−1.00%
1881	1,308	+0.69%
1886	1,289	−0.29%
1891	1,277	−0.19%
1896	1,250	−0.43%
1901	1,243	−0.11%

Year	Pop.	±% p.a.
1906	1,169	−1.22%
1911	1,140	−0.50%
1921	1,064	−0.69%
1926	1,048	−0.30%
1931	1,013	−0.68%
1936	1,028	+0.29%
1946	975	−0.53%
1954	1,080	+1.29%
1962	967	−1.37%
1968	1,112	+2.36%
1975	1,350	+2.81%
1982	2,738	+10.63%
1990	2,931	+0.86%
1999	3,214	+1.03%
2007	3,311	+0.37%
2012	3,242	−0.42%
2017	3,365	+0.75%
2023	3,677	+1.49%

Source: EHESS and INSEE (1968-2023)

== Gallery ==
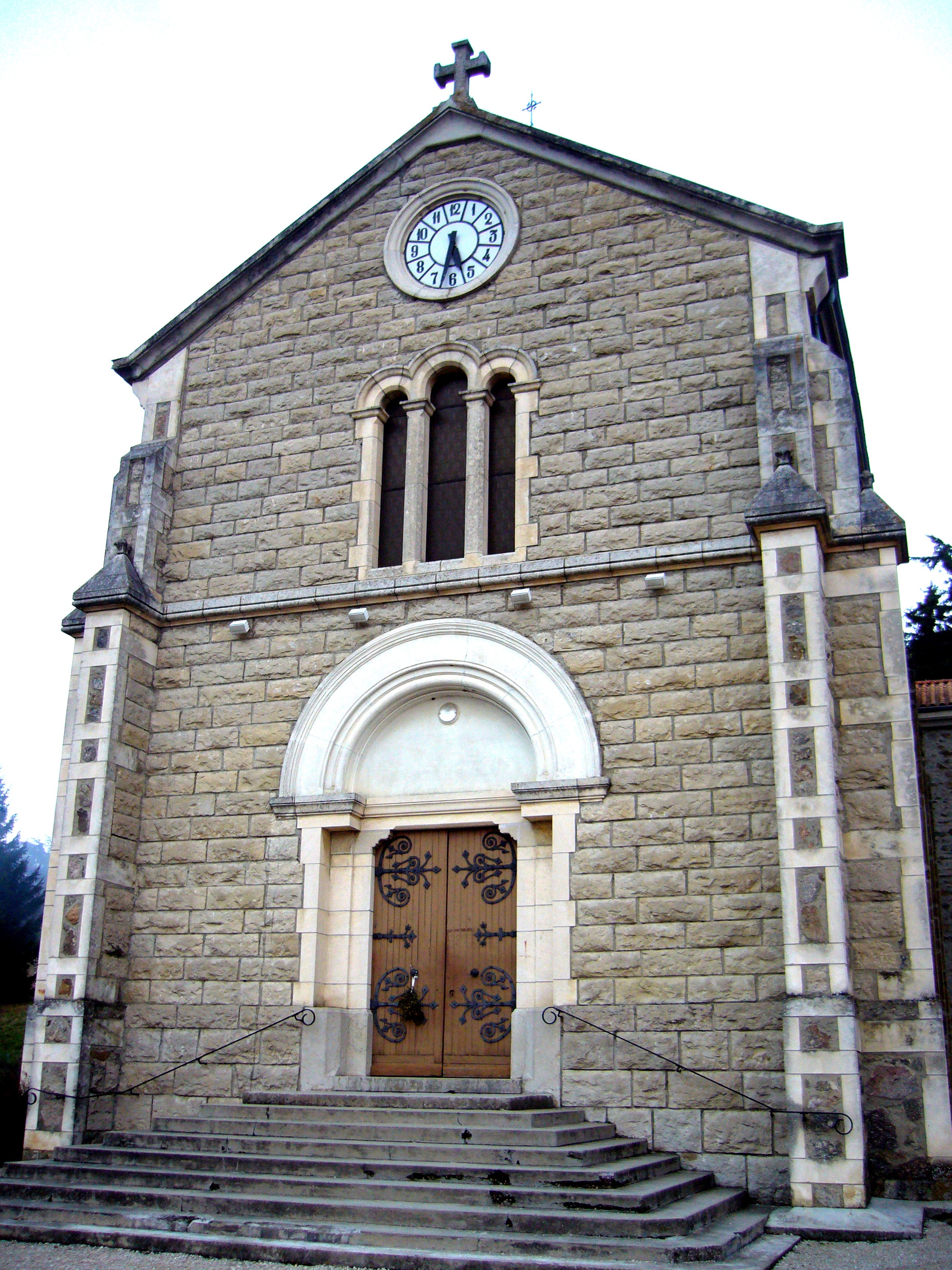
The Church

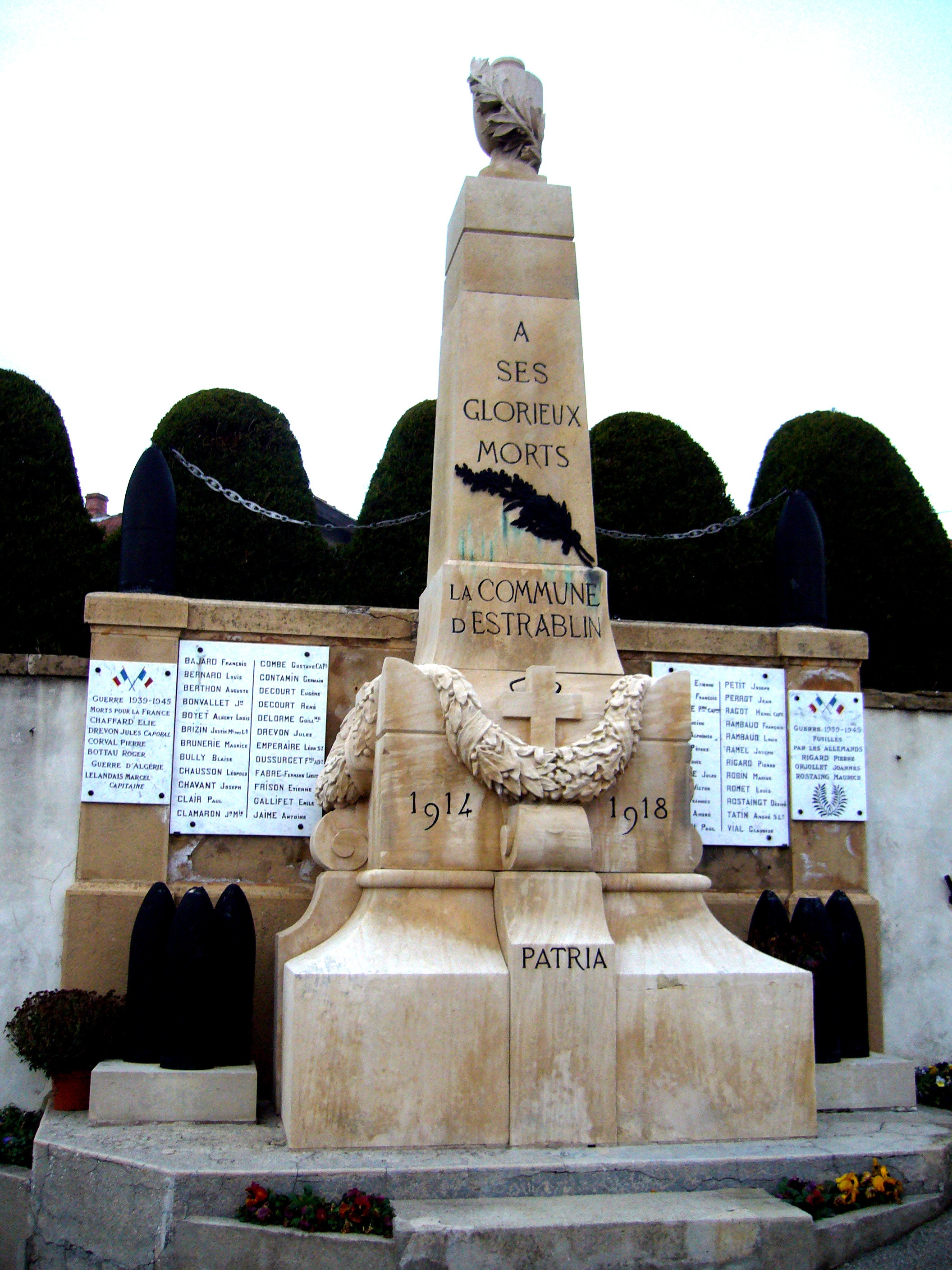
Monument commemorating the death of Estrablin inhabitants during the World Wars

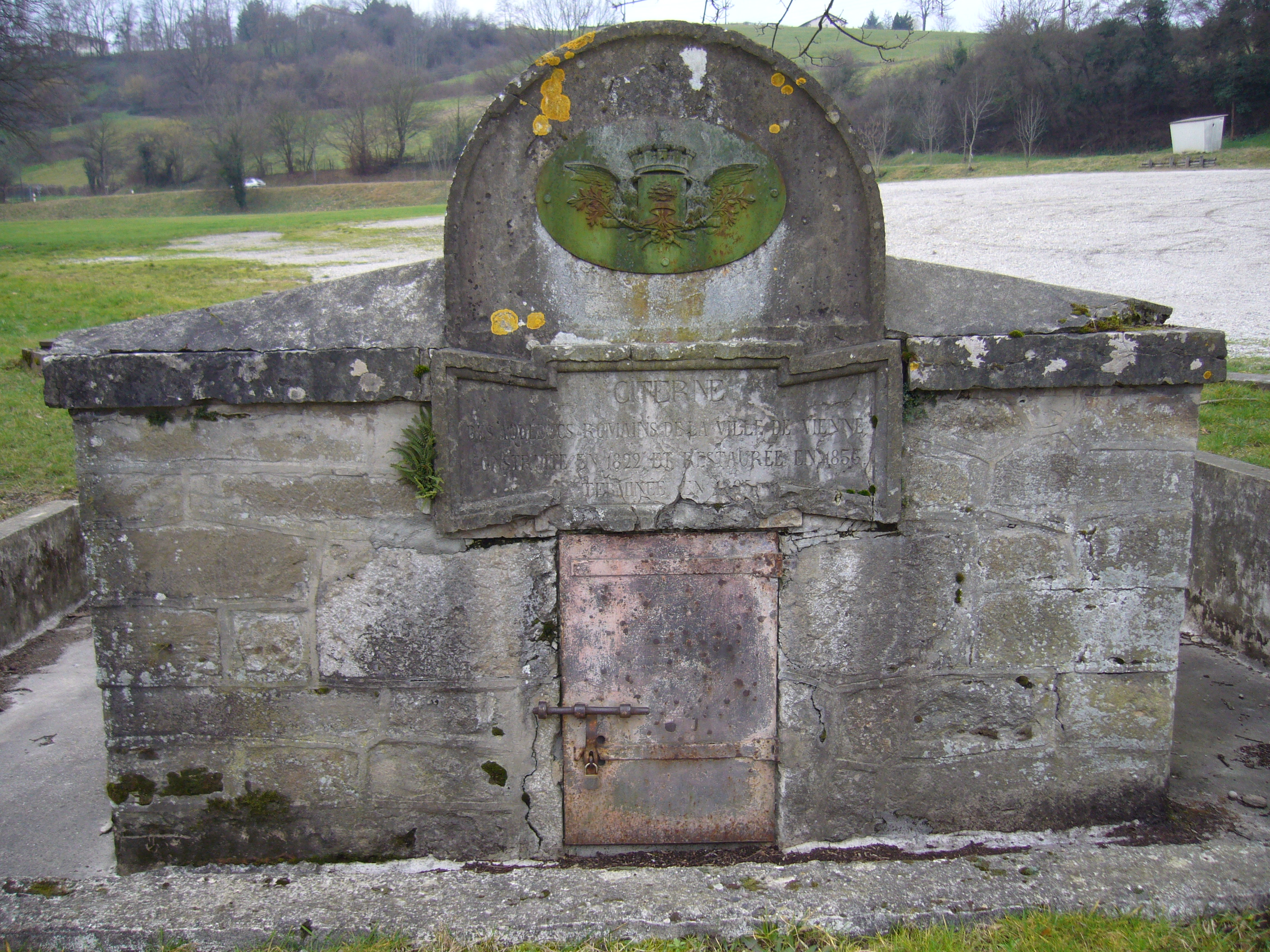
1822 Water supply reservoir in the hamlet of Gemens

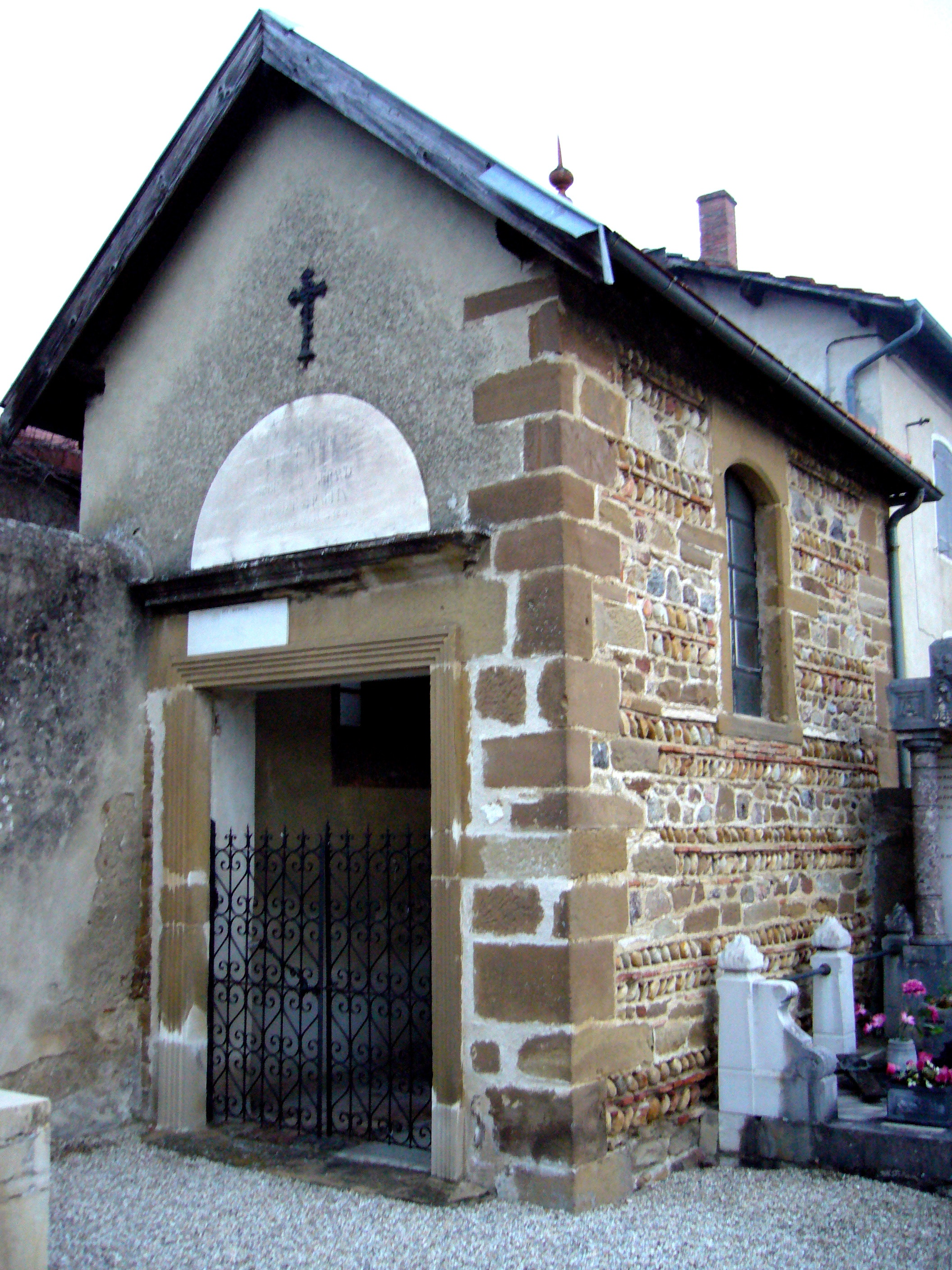
Chapel in the cemetery

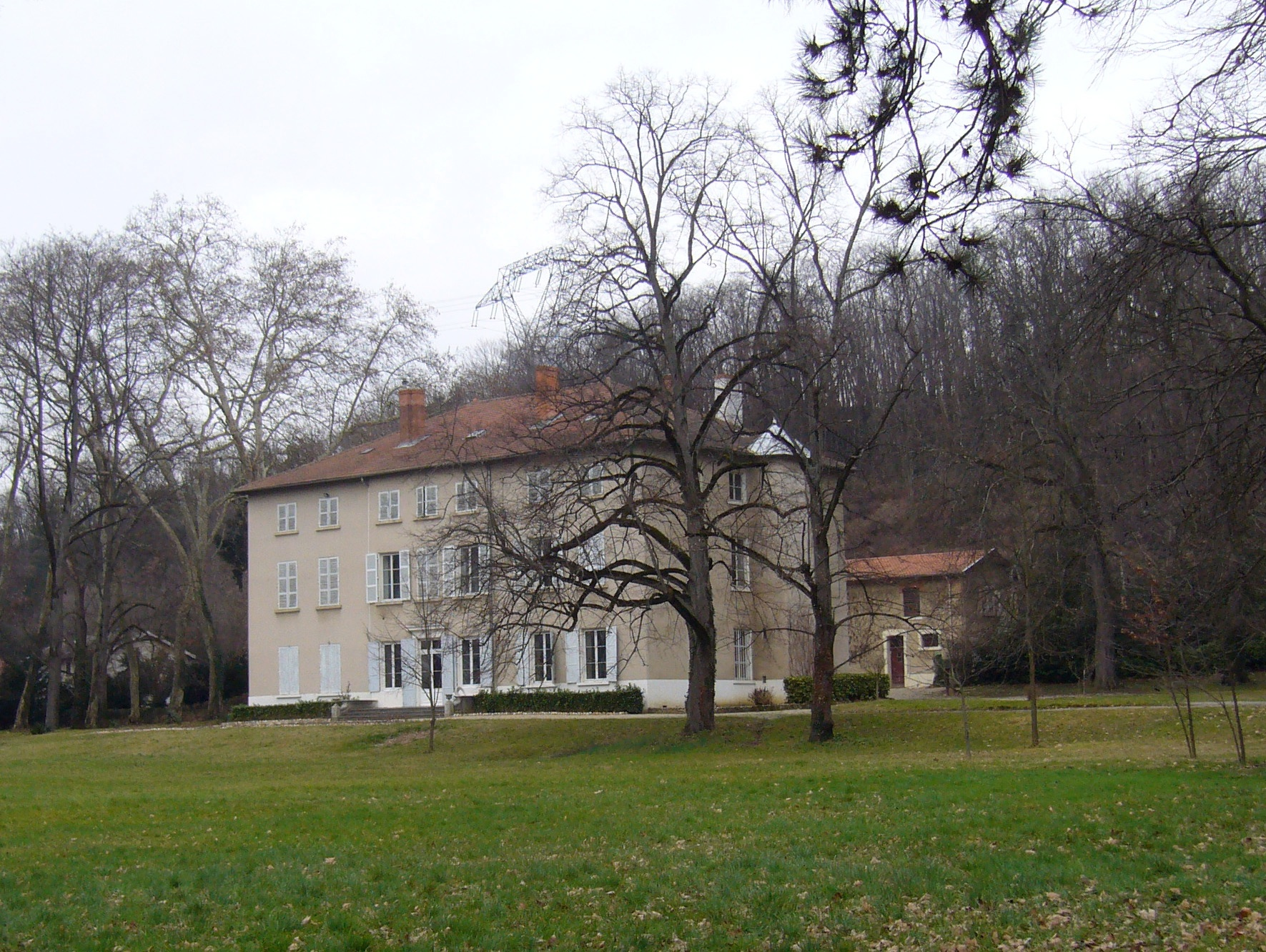
Château Guerre

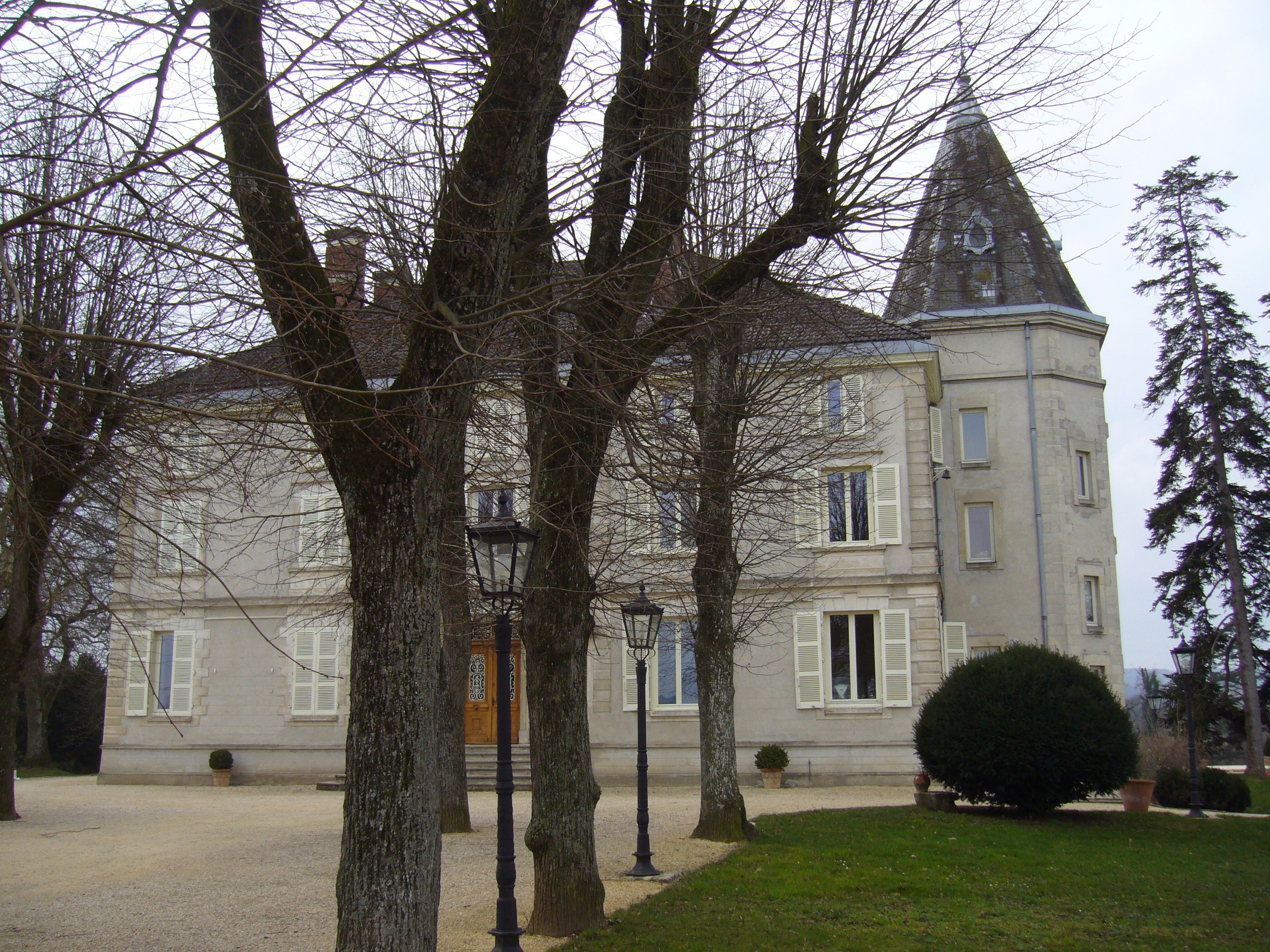
Château Doyon, in the hamlet of La Craz

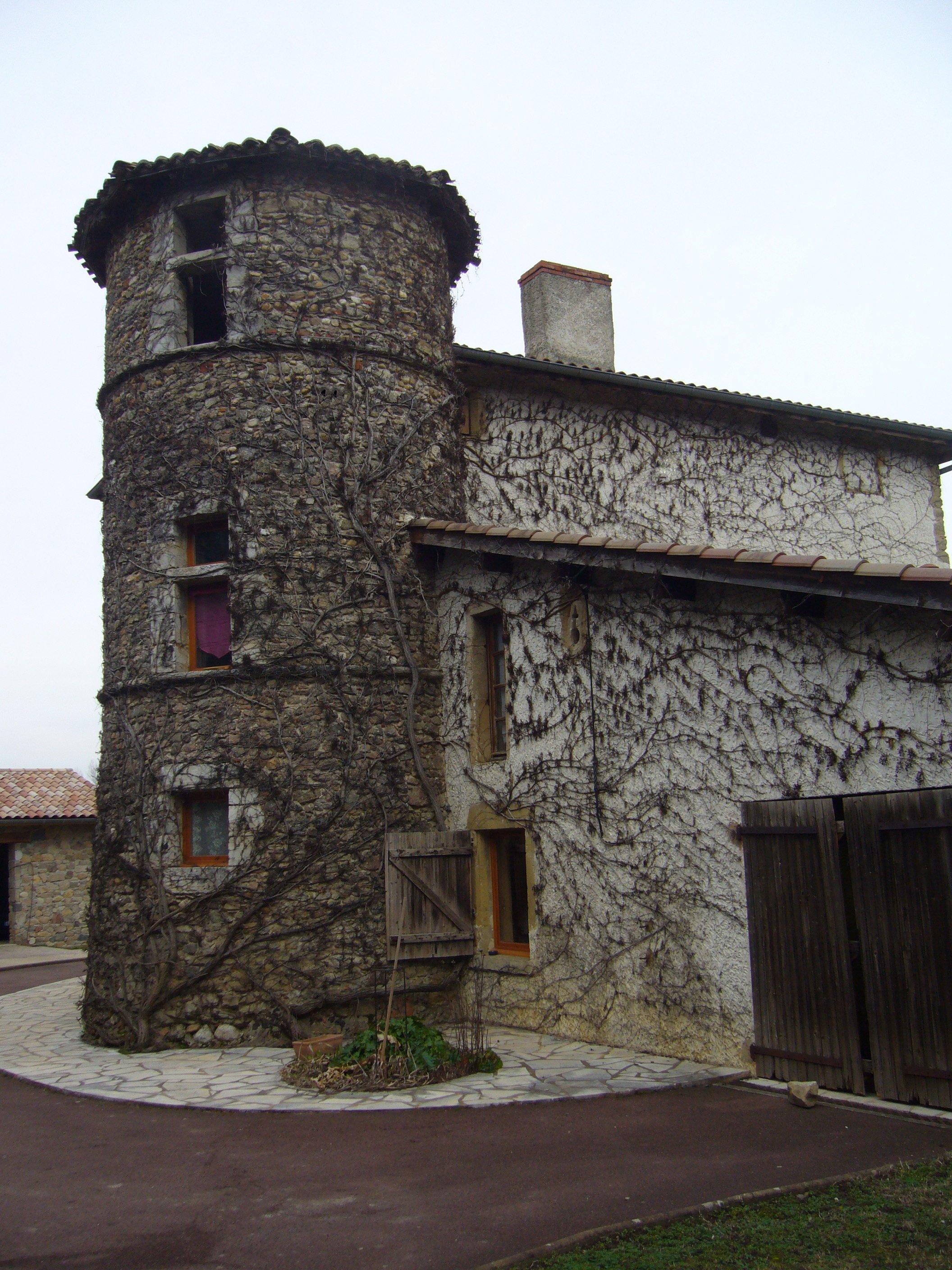
Medieval fortified house in the hamlet of Aiguebelle

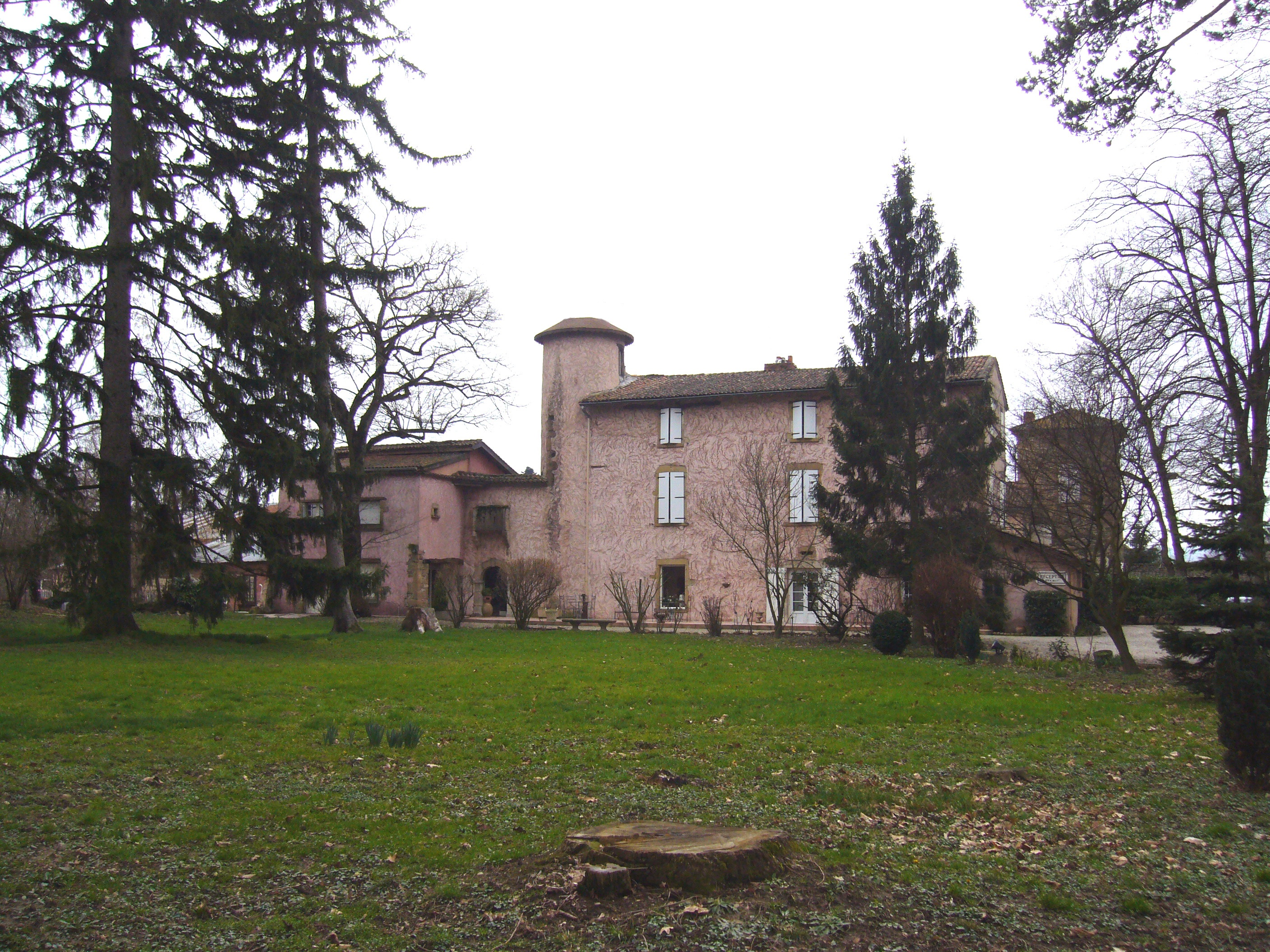
La Gabetière, home of Jean-Jacques Gabet

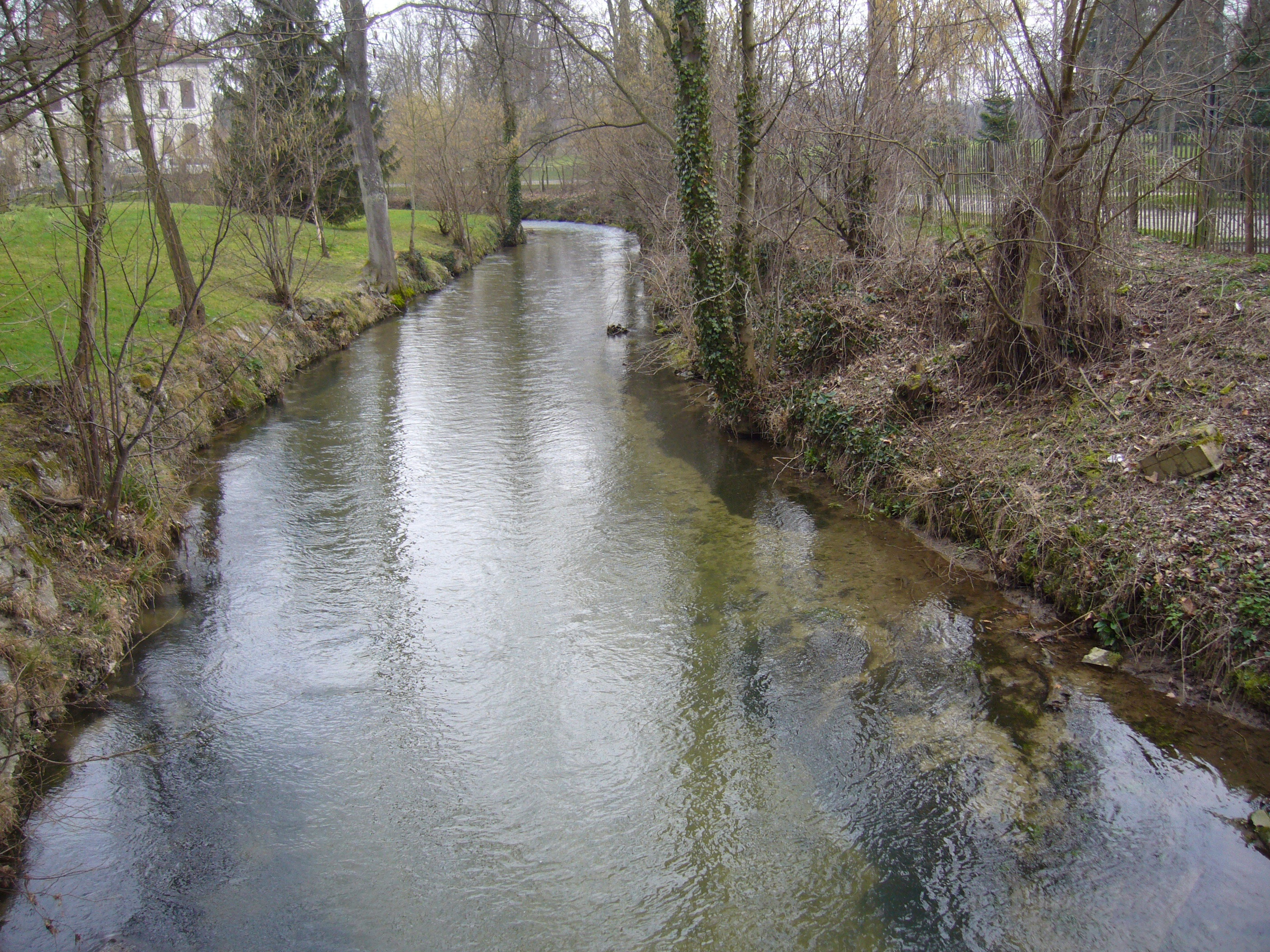
The Gere river, near the hamlet of La Craz

== See also ==
- Communes of the Isère department
