= Canton of Vienne-2 =

Coordinates: 45.52°N 4.87°E

The canton of Vienne-2 is an administrative division of the Isère department, eastern France. It was created at the French canton reorganisation which came into effect in March 2015. Its seat is in Vienne.

It consists of the following communes:

- Assieu
- Auberives-sur-Varèze
- Cheyssieu
- Chonas-l'Amballan
- Clonas-sur-Varèze
- Les Côtes-d'Arey
- Estrablin
- Eyzin-Pinet
- Jardin
- Reventin-Vaugris
- Les Roches-de-Condrieu
- Saint-Alban-du-Rhône
- Saint-Clair-du-Rhône
- Saint-Maurice-l'Exil
- Saint-Prim
- Saint-Sorlin-de-Vienne
- Vernioz
- Vienne (partly)
