= Arrondissement of Vienne =

Coordinates: 45°31′22″N 4°52′25″E

Vienne
- Arrondissement
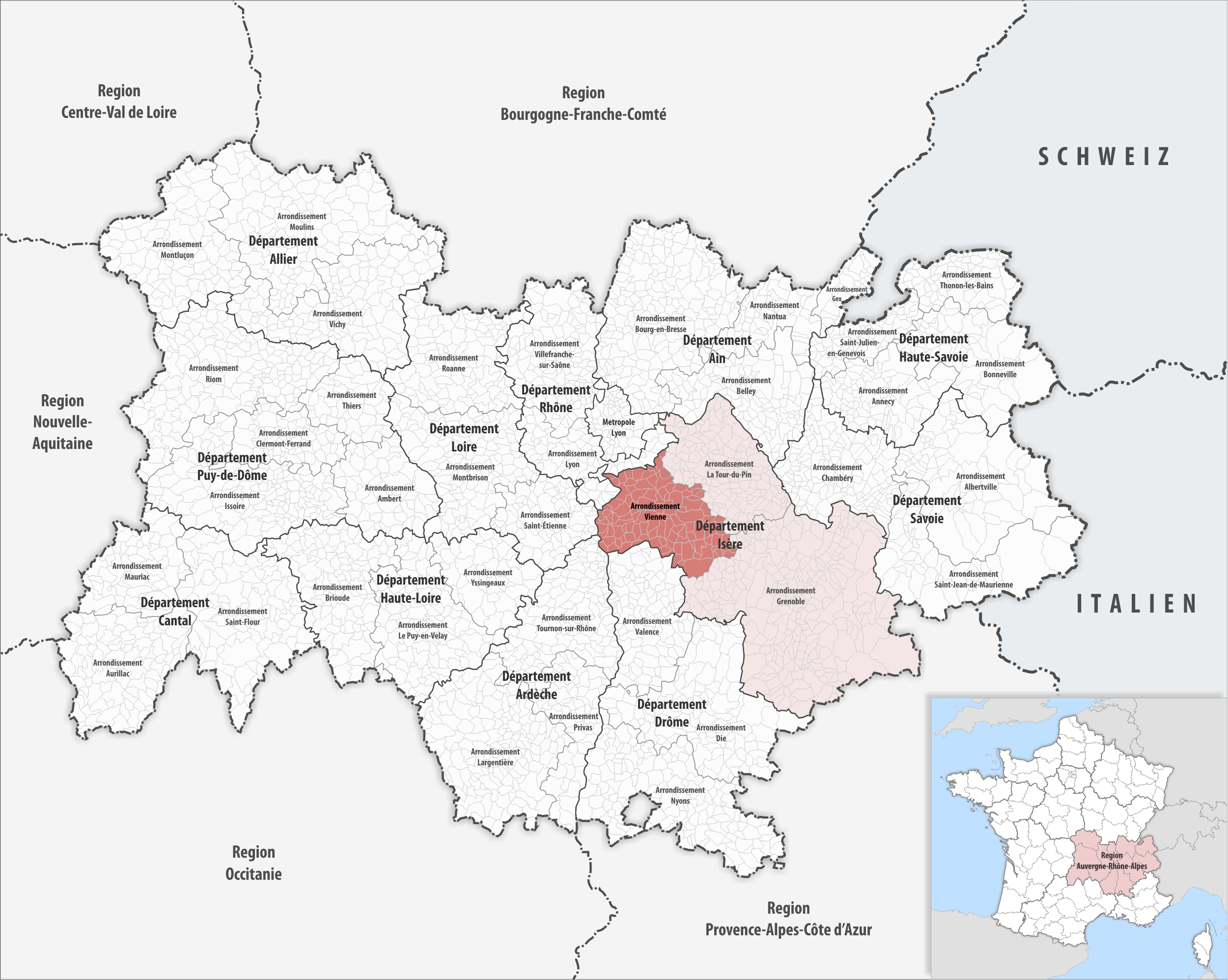
- Location within the region Auvergne-Rhône-Alpes
- Country: France
- Region: Auvergne-Rhône-Alpes
- Department: Isère
- No. of communes: {{{nbcomm}}}
- Area: 1,489.7 km^{2} (575.2 sq mi)
- Population (2023): 224,940
  - Density: 151.00/km^{2} (391.08/sq mi)
- INSEE code: 383

The arrondissement of Vienne is an arrondissement of France in the Isère department in the Auvergne-Rhône-Alpes region. It has 113 communes. Its population is 220,438 (2021), and its area is 1,489.7 km^{2} (575.2 sq mi).

== Composition ==
The communes of the arrondissement of Vienne, and their INSEE codes, are:

1. Agnin (38003)
2. Anjou (38009)
3. Artas (38015)
4. Assieu (38017)
5. Auberives-sur-Varèze (38019)
6. Beaufort (38032)
7. Beaurepaire (38034)
8. Beauvoir-de-Marc (38035)
9. Bellegarde-Poussieu (38037)
10. Bossieu (38049)
11. Bougé-Chambalud (38051)
12. Bressieux (38056)
13. Brézins (38058)
14. Brion (38060)
15. Champier (38069)
16. Chanas (38072)
17. La Chapelle-de-Surieu (38077)
18. Charantonnay (38081)
19. Chasse-sur-Rhône (38087)
20. Châtenay (38093)
21. Cheyssieu (38101)
22. Chonas-l'Amballan (38107)
23. Chuzelles (38110)
24. Chalon (38066)
25. Châtonnay (38094)
26. Clonas-sur-Varèze (38114)
27. La Côte-Saint-André (38130)
28. Les Côtes-d'Arey (38131)
29. Cour-et-Buis (38134)
30. Culin (38141)
31. Diémoz (38144)
32. Estrablin (38157)
33. Eyzin-Pinet (38160)
34. Faramans (38161)
35. La Forteresse (38171)
36. La Frette (38174)
37. Gillonnay (38180)
38. Grenay (38184)
39. Heyrieux (38189)
40. Jarcieu (38198)
41. Jardin (38199)
42. Lentiol (38209)
43. Lieudieu (38211)
44. Longechenal (38213)
45. Luzinay (38215)
46. Marcilloles (38218)
47. Marcollin (38219)
48. Marnans (38221)
49. Meyrieu-les-Étangs (38231)
50. Meyssiez (38232)
51. Moidieu-Détourbe (38238)
52. Moissieu-sur-Dolon (38240)
53. Monsteroux-Milieu (38244)
54. Montfalcon (38255)
55. Montseveroux (38259)
56. Mottier (38267)
57. Ornacieux-Balbins (38284)
58. Oytier-Saint-Oblas (38288)
59. Pact (38290)
60. Pajay (38291)
61. Le Péage-de-Roussillon (38298)
62. Penol (38300)
63. Pisieu (38307)
64. Plan (38308)
65. Pommier-de-Beaurepaire (38311)
66. Pont-Évêque (38318)
67. Porte-des-Bonnevaux (38479)
68. Primarette (38324)
69. Revel-Tourdan (38335)
70. Reventin-Vaugris (38336)
71. Les Roches-de-Condrieu (38340)
72. Roussillon (38344)
73. Royas (38346)
74. Roybon (38347)
75. Sablons (38349)
76. Saint-Agnin-sur-Bion (38351)
77. Saint-Alban-du-Rhône (38353)
78. Saint-Barthélemy (38363)
79. Saint-Clair-du-Rhône (38378)
80. Saint-Clair-sur-Galaure (38379)
81. Sainte-Anne-sur-Gervonde (38358)
82. Saint-Étienne-de-Saint-Geoirs (38384)
83. Saint-Geoirs (38387)
84. Saint-Georges-d'Espéranche (38389)
85. Saint-Hilaire-de-la-Côte (38393)
86. Saint-Jean-de-Bournay (38399)
87. Saint-Julien-de-l'Herms (38406)
88. Saint-Just-Chaleyssin (38408)
89. Saint-Maurice-l'Exil (38425)
90. Saint-Michel-de-Saint-Geoirs (38427)
91. Saint-Paul-d'Izeaux (38437)
92. Saint-Pierre-de-Bressieux (38440)
93. Saint-Prim (38448)
94. Saint-Romain-de-Surieu (38452)
95. Saint-Siméon-de-Bressieux (38457)
96. Saint-Sorlin-de-Vienne (38459)
97. Salaise-sur-Sanne (38468)
98. Sardieu (38473)
99. Savas-Mépin (38476)
100. Septème (38480)
101. Serpaize (38484)
102. Seyssuel (38487)
103. Sillans (38490)
104. Sonnay (38496)
105. Thodure (38505)
106. Tramolé (38512)
107. Valencin (38519)
108. Vernioz (38536)
109. Vienne (38544)
110. Villeneuve-de-Marc (38555)
111. Ville-sous-Anjou (38556)
112. Villette-de-Vienne (38558)
113. Viriville (38561)

== History ==
The arrondissement of Vienne was created in 1800. At the January 2017 reorganisation of the arrondissements of Isère, it gained 24 communes from the arrondissement of Grenoble and one commune from the arrondissement of La Tour-du-Pin, and it lost six communes to the arrondissement of La Tour-du-Pin.

As a result of the reorganisation of the cantons of France which came into effect in 2015, the borders of the cantons are no longer related to the borders of the arrondissements. The cantons of the arrondissement of Vienne were, as of January 2015:

1. Beaurepaire
2. La Côte-Saint-André
3. Heyrieux
4. Pont-de-Chéruy
5. Roussillon
6. Saint-Jean-de-Bournay
7. Vienne-Nord
8. Vienne-Sud

== Sub-prefects ==
- Richard Samuel: on 24 March 1993
