= Vernioz =

- Commune
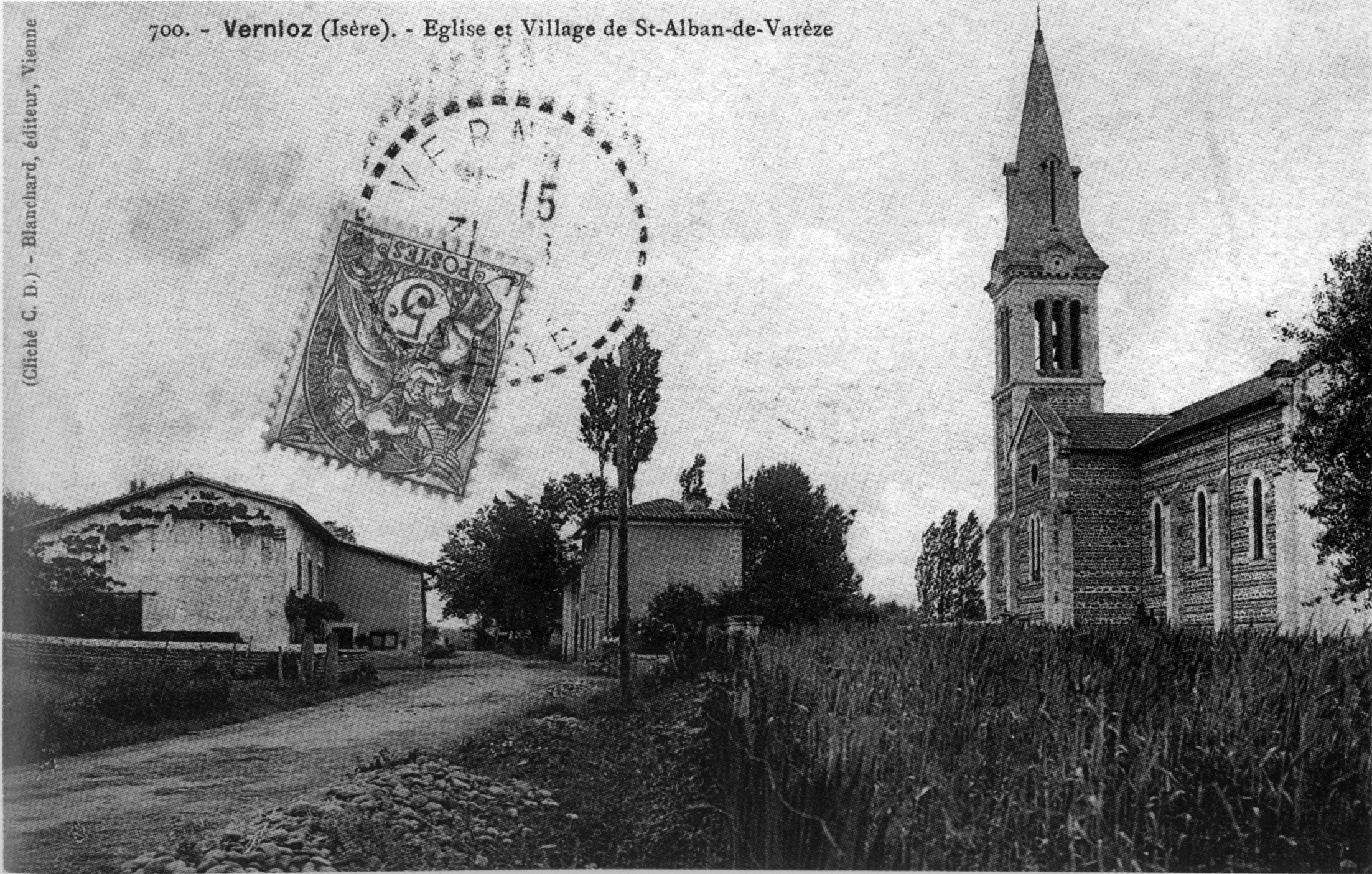
- The church and village of Saint-Alban-de-Varèze in 1907
- Location of Vernioz
- Location within France Location within Auvergne-Rhône-Alpes
- Coordinates: 45°25′22″N 4°54′20″E
- Country: France
- Region: Auvergne-Rhône-Alpes
- Department: Isère
- Arrondissement: Vienne
- Canton: Vienne-2
- Intercommunality: Entre Bièvre et Rhône

Government
  - Mayor (2020–2026): Jean-Marc Rey
- Area^{1}: 11.32 km^{2} (4.37 sq mi)
- Elevation: 230 m (750 ft)
- Highest elevation: 408 m (1,339 ft)
- Lowest elevation: 218 m (715 ft)
- Population (2023): 1,521
  - Density: 134.4/km^{2} (348.0/sq mi)
- Time zone: UTC+01:00 (CET)
  - Summer (DST): UTC+02:00 (CEST)
- INSEE/Postal code: 38536 /38150
- ^{1} French Land Register data, which excludes lakes, ponds, glaciers > 1 km^{2} (0.386 sq mi or 247 acres) and river estuaries.

Vernioz (French pronunciation: [vɛʁnjo]) is a commune in the Isère department in southeastern France. As of January 2020, the population of the commune spread over 11.32 km^{2} (4.37 sq ml) was 1,439, with a density ratio of 130 persons per km^{2}.

== Population ==
Historical population
Year	Pop.	±% p.a.
1968	531	—
1975	475	−1.58%
1982	689	+5.46%
1990	798	+1.85%
1999	888	+1.19%
2007	1,097	+2.68%
2012	1,205	+1.90%
2017	1,294	+1.44%
2023	1,521	+2.73%
Source: INSEE

== See also ==
- Communes of the Isère department
