= Saint-Sorlin-de-Vienne =

- Commune
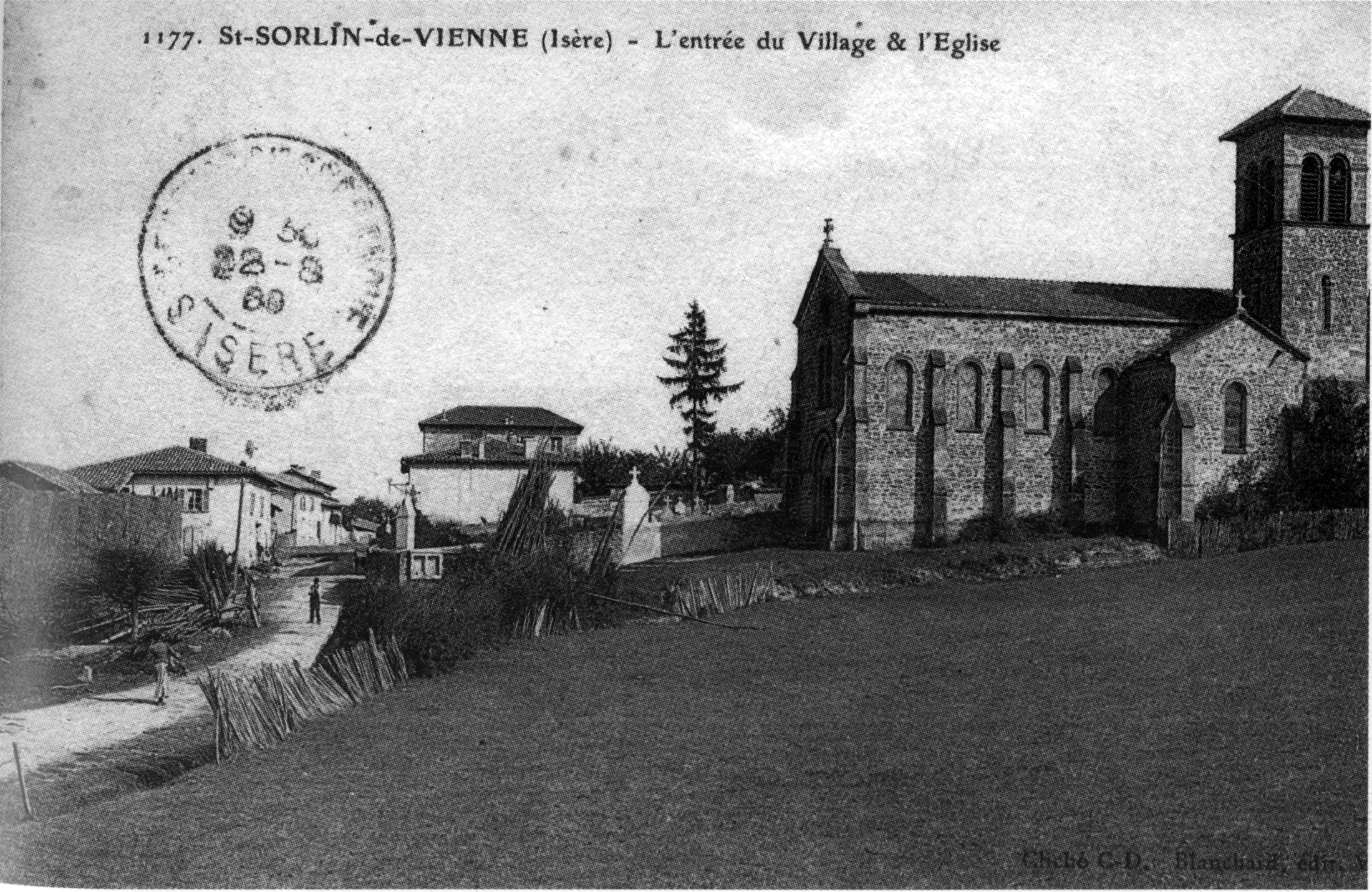
- Saint-Sorlin-de-Vienne in 1909
- Location of Saint-Sorlin-de-Vienne
- Location within France Location within Auvergne-Rhône-Alpes
- Coordinates: 45°28′07″N 4°56′36″E
- Country: France
- Region: Auvergne-Rhône-Alpes
- Department: Isère
- Arrondissement: Vienne
- Canton: Vienne-2
- Intercommunality: CA Vienne Condrieu

Government
  - Mayor (2020–2026): Isidore Polo
- Area^{1}: 9.94 km^{2} (3.84 sq mi)
- Elevation: 362 m (1,188 ft)
- Highest elevation: 428 m (1,404 ft)
- Lowest elevation: 219 m (719 ft)
- Population (2023): 964
  - Density: 97.0/km^{2} (251/sq mi)
- Time zone: UTC+01:00 (CET)
  - Summer (DST): UTC+02:00 (CEST)
- INSEE/Postal code: 38459 /38200
- ^{1} French Land Register data, which excludes lakes, ponds, glaciers > 1 km^{2} (0.386 sq mi or 247 acres) and river estuaries.

Saint-Sorlin-de-Vienne (French pronunciation: [sɛ̃ sɔʁlɛ̃ də vjɛn], literally Saint-Sorlin of Vienne) is a commune in the Isère department in southeastern France.

== Population ==
Historical population
Year	Pop.	±% p.a.
1968	312	—
1975	338	+1.15%
1982	612	+8.85%
1990	695	+1.60%
1999	700	+0.08%
2007	799	+1.67%
2012	829	+0.74%
2017	878	+1.16%
2023	964	+1.57%
Source: INSEE

== See also ==
- Communes of the Isère department
