= Les Roches-de-Condrieu =

- Commune
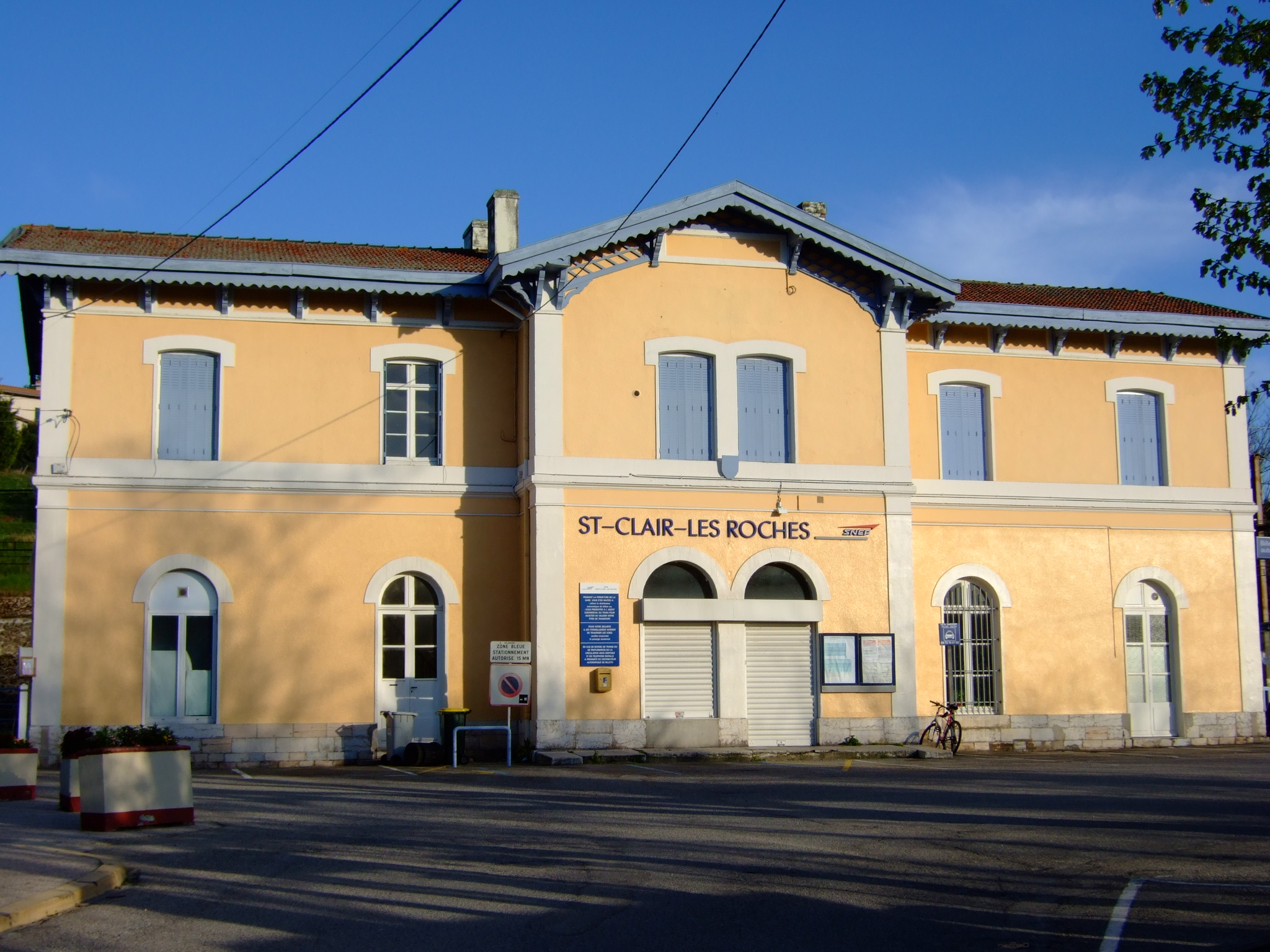
- Train station

- Coat of arms
- Location of Les Roches-de-Condrieu
- Location within France Location within Auvergne-Rhône-Alpes
- Coordinates: 45°27′14″N 4°46′07″E
- Country: France
- Region: Auvergne-Rhône-Alpes
- Department: Isère
- Arrondissement: Vienne
- Canton: Vienne-2

Government
  - Mayor (2020–2026): Isabelle Dugua
- Area^{1}: 1.03 km^{2} (0.40 sq mi)
- Elevation: 157 m (515 ft)
- Highest elevation: 200 m (660 ft)
- Lowest elevation: 155 m (509 ft)
- Population (2023): 2,055
  - Density: 2,000/km^{2} (5,170/sq mi)
- Time zone: UTC+01:00 (CET)
  - Summer (DST): UTC+02:00 (CEST)
- INSEE/Postal code: 38340 /38370
- ^{1} French Land Register data, which excludes lakes, ponds, glaciers > 1 km^{2} (0.386 sq mi or 247 acres) and river estuaries.

Les Roches-de-Condrieu (French pronunciation: [le ʁɔʃ də kɔ̃dʁijø]) is a commune in the Isère department in southeastern France.

== Population ==
Historical population
Year	Pop.	±% p.a.
1968	1,534	—
1975	1,576	+0.39%
1982	1,728	+1.32%
1990	1,836	+0.76%
1999	1,819	−0.10%
2007	1,924	+0.70%
2012	1,994	+0.72%
2017	1,925	−0.70%
2023	2,055	+1.10%
Source: INSEE

== Twin towns ==
Les Roches-de-Condrieu is twinned with:

- Cerisano, Italy, since 2009

== See also ==
- Communes of the Isère department
