= Clonas-sur-Varèze =

- Commune
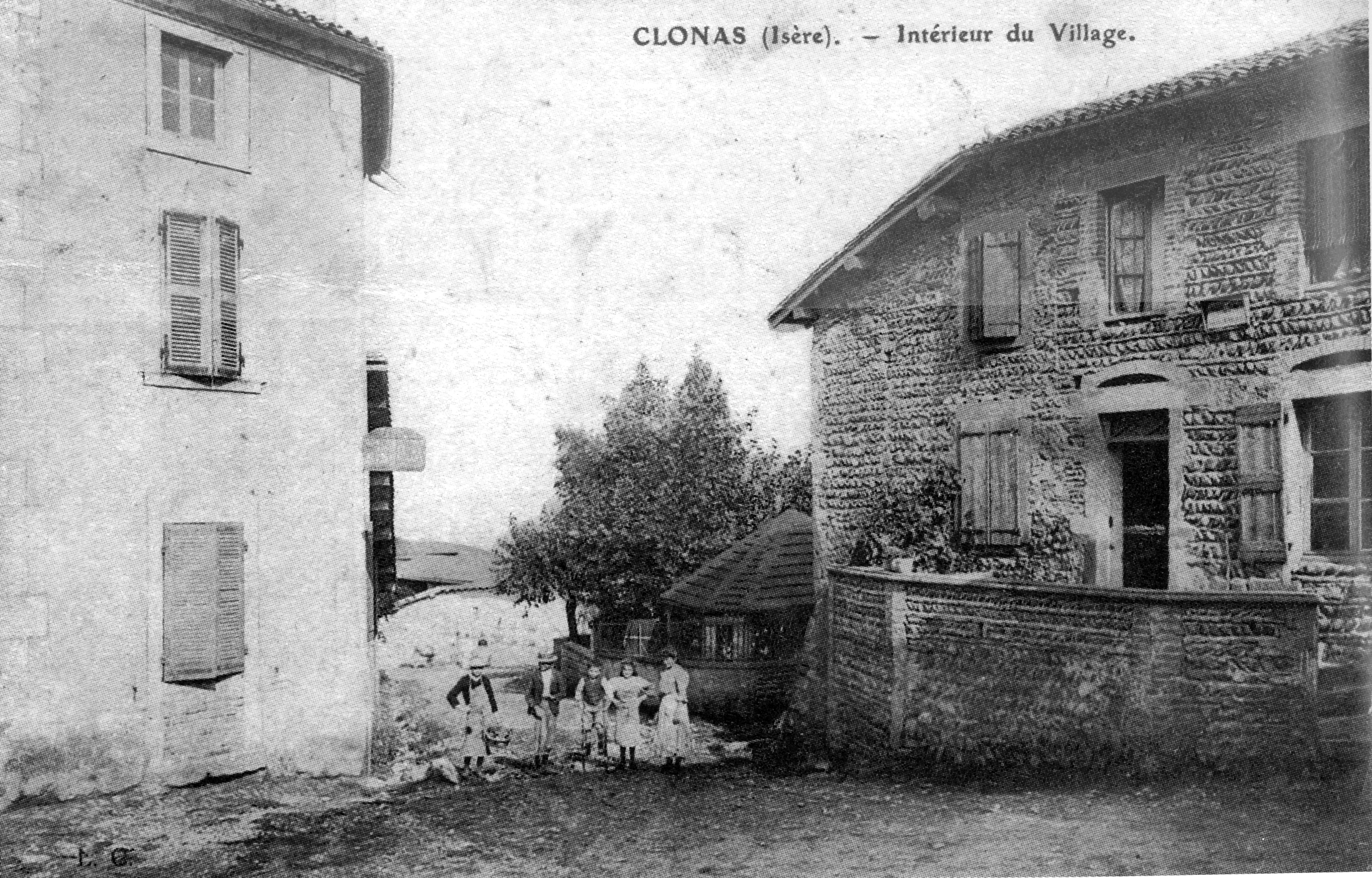
- Clonas-sur-Varèze in 1907
- Location of Clonas-sur-Varèze
- Location within France Location within Auvergne-Rhône-Alpes
- Coordinates: 45°24′53″N 4°47′30″E
- Country: France
- Region: Auvergne-Rhône-Alpes
- Department: Isère
- Arrondissement: Vienne
- Canton: Vienne-2

Government
  - Mayor (2020–2026): Régis Viallatte
- Area^{1}: 6.83 km^{2} (2.64 sq mi)
- Elevation: 155 m (509 ft)
- Highest elevation: 256 m (840 ft)
- Lowest elevation: 157 m (515 ft)
- Population (2023): 1,535
  - Density: 225/km^{2} (582/sq mi)
- Time zone: UTC+01:00 (CET)
  - Summer (DST): UTC+02:00 (CEST)
- INSEE/Postal code: 38114 /38550
- ^{1} French Land Register data, which excludes lakes, ponds, glaciers > 1 km^{2} (0.386 sq mi or 247 acres) and river estuaries.

Clonas-sur-Varèze (French pronunciation: [klɔna syʁ vaʁɛz]) is a commune in the Isère department in southeastern France.

== Population ==
Historical population
Year	Pop.	±% p.a.
1968	517	—
1975	554	+0.99%
1982	703	+3.46%
1990	1,056	+5.22%
1999	1,281	+2.17%
2007	1,445	+1.52%
2012	1,528	+1.12%
2017	1,458	−0.93%
2023	1,535	+0.86%
Source: INSEE

== See also ==
- Communes of the Isère department
