= Chonas-l'Amballan =

- Commune
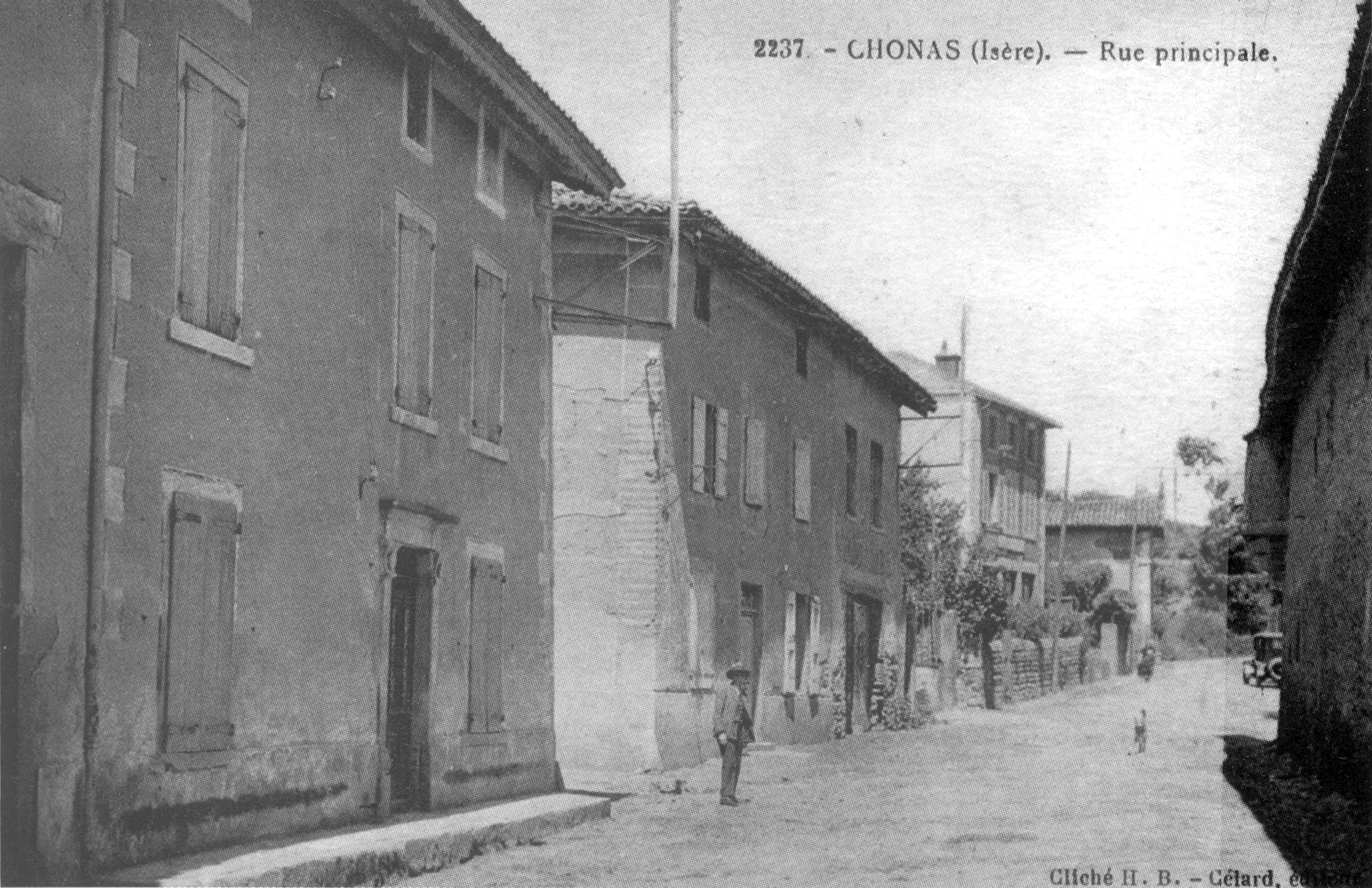
- The main road of Chonas-l'Amballan in 1912
- Location of Chonas-l'Amballan
- Location within France Location within Auvergne-Rhône-Alpes
- Coordinates: 45°27′42″N 4°48′45″E
- Country: France
- Region: Auvergne-Rhône-Alpes
- Department: Isère
- Arrondissement: Vienne
- Canton: Vienne-2
- Intercommunality: CA Vienne Condrieu

Government
  - Mayor (2020–2026): Jean Proenca
- Area^{1}: 7.41 km^{2} (2.86 sq mi)
- Highest elevation: 323 m (1,060 ft)
- Lowest elevation: 146 m (479 ft)
- Population (2019): 1,680
  - Density: 227/km^{2} (587/sq mi)
- Time zone: UTC+01:00 (CET)
  - Summer (DST): UTC+02:00 (CEST)
- INSEE/Postal code: 38107 /38121
- ^{1} French Land Register data, which excludes lakes, ponds, glaciers > 1 km^{2} (0.386 sq mi or 247 acres) and river estuaries.

Chonas-l'Amballan (French pronunciation: [ʃɔna lɑ̃balɑ̃]) is a commune in the Isère department in southeastern France.

== Population ==
Historical population
Year	Pop.	±% p.a.
1968	517	—
1975	702	+4.47%
1982	863	+2.99%
1990	1,005	+1.92%
1999	1,219	+2.17%
2007	1,508	+2.70%
2012	1,551	+0.56%
2017	1,668	+1.47%
2023	1,729	+0.60%
Source: INSEE

== See also ==
- Communes of the Isère department
