= Cheyssieu =

- Commune
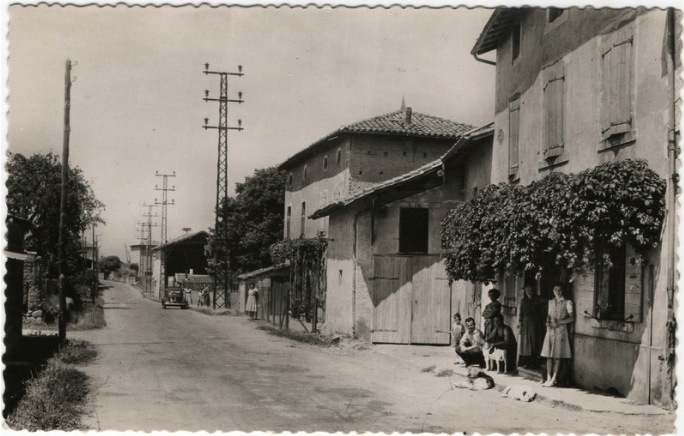
- The village in the early 20th century
- Location of Cheyssieu
- Location within France Location within Auvergne-Rhône-Alpes
- Coordinates: 45°25′47″N 4°50′25″E
- Country: France
- Region: Auvergne-Rhône-Alpes
- Department: Isère
- Arrondissement: Vienne
- Canton: Vienne-2
- Intercommunality: Entre Bièvre et Rhône

Government
  - Mayor (2020–2026): Gilles Bonneton
- Area^{1}: 8.55 km^{2} (3.30 sq mi)
- Elevation: 160 m (520 ft)
- Highest elevation: 254 m (833 ft)
- Lowest elevation: 180 m (590 ft)
- Population (2023): 1,074
  - Density: 126/km^{2} (325/sq mi)
- Time zone: UTC+01:00 (CET)
  - Summer (DST): UTC+02:00 (CEST)
- INSEE/Postal code: 38101 /38550
- ^{1} French Land Register data, which excludes lakes, ponds, glaciers > 1 km^{2} (0.386 sq mi or 247 acres) and river estuaries.

Cheyssieu (French pronunciation: [ʃesjø]) is a commune in the Isère department in southeastern France.

== Population ==
Historical population
Year	Pop.	±% p.a.
1968	403	—
1975	423	+0.69%
1982	566	+4.25%
1990	648	+1.71%
1999	731	+1.35%
2007	967	+3.56%
2012	1,052	+1.70%
2017	1,024	−0.54%
2023	1,074	+0.80%
Source: INSEE

== See also ==
- Communes of the Isère department
