= Saint-Prim =

- Commune
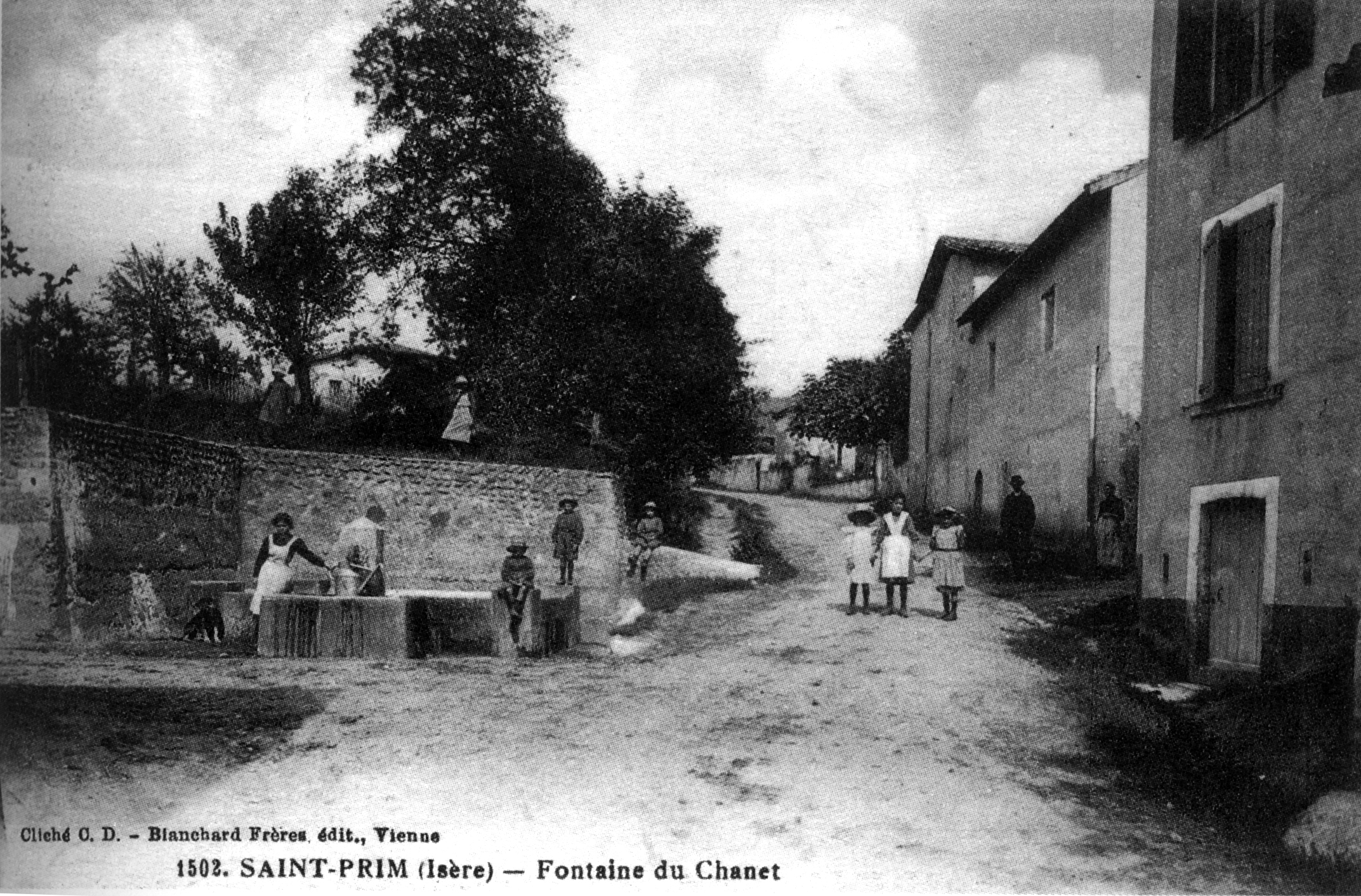
- Saint-Prim in 1906
- Location of Saint-Prim
- Location within France Location within Auvergne-Rhône-Alpes
- Coordinates: 45°26′40″N 4°47′39″E
- Country: France
- Region: Auvergne-Rhône-Alpes
- Department: Isère
- Arrondissement: Vienne
- Canton: Vienne-2

Government
  - Mayor (2020–2026): Michel Cros
- Area^{1}: 7.3 km^{2} (2.8 sq mi)
- Elevation: 233 m (764 ft)
- Highest elevation: 309 m (1,014 ft)
- Lowest elevation: 155 m (509 ft)
- Population (2023): 1,478
  - Density: 200/km^{2} (520/sq mi)
- Time zone: UTC+01:00 (CET)
  - Summer (DST): UTC+02:00 (CEST)
- INSEE/Postal code: 38448 /38370
- ^{1} French Land Register data, which excludes lakes, ponds, glaciers > 1 km^{2} (0.386 sq mi or 247 acres) and river estuaries.

Saint-Prim is a commune in the Isère department in southeastern France.

== Population ==
Historical population
Year	Pop.	±% p.a.
1968	409	—
1975	507	+3.12%
1982	599	+2.41%
1990	733	+2.56%
1999	892	+2.21%
2007	1,057	+2.14%
2012	1,239	+3.23%
2017	1,372	+2.06%
2023	1,478	+1.25%
Source: INSEE

== See also ==
- Communes of the Isère department
