= Eyzin-Pinet =

- Commune
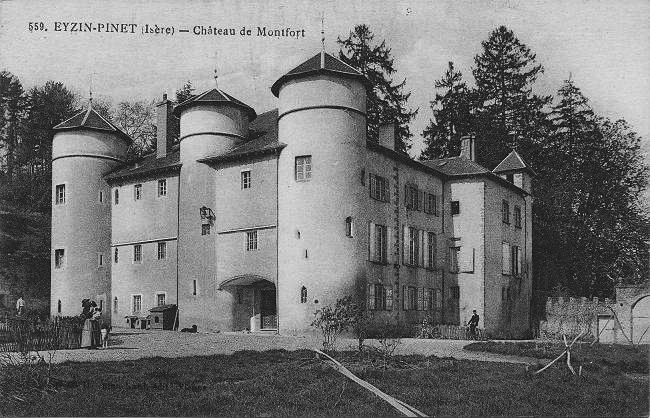
- The Chateau of Montfort in the early 20th century

- Coat of arms
- Location of Eyzin-Pinet
- Location within France Location within Auvergne-Rhône-Alpes
- Coordinates: 45°28′25″N 5°00′03″E
- Country: France
- Region: Auvergne-Rhône-Alpes
- Department: Isère
- Arrondissement: Vienne
- Canton: Vienne-2
- Intercommunality: CA Vienne Condrieu

Government
  - Mayor (2020–2026): Christian Janin
- Area^{1}: 28.44 km^{2} (10.98 sq mi)
- Elevation: 312 m (1,024 ft)
- Highest elevation: 450 m (1,480 ft)
- Lowest elevation: 218 m (715 ft)
- Population (2023): 2,285
  - Density: 80.34/km^{2} (208.1/sq mi)
- Time zone: UTC+01:00 (CET)
  - Summer (DST): UTC+02:00 (CEST)
- INSEE/Postal code: 38160 /38780
- ^{1} French Land Register data, which excludes lakes, ponds, glaciers > 1 km^{2} (0.386 sq mi or 247 acres) and river estuaries.

Eyzin-Pinet (French pronunciation: [ezɛ̃ pinɛ]) is a commune in the Isère department in southeastern France.

== Population ==
Historical population

Year	Pop.	±% p.a.
1793	1,642	—
1800	1,272	−3.58%
1806	1,417	+1.82%
1821	1,444	+0.13%
1831	1,526	+0.55%
1836	1,670	+1.82%
1841	1,753	+0.97%
1846	1,840	+0.97%
1851	1,791	−0.54%
1856	1,632	−1.84%
1861	1,675	+0.52%
1866	1,593	−1.00%
1872	1,427	−1.82%
1876	1,411	−0.28%
1881	1,336	−1.09%
1886	1,353	+0.25%
1891	1,370	+0.25%
1896	1,320	−0.74%
1901	1,310	−0.15%

Year	Pop.	±% p.a.
1906	1,321	+0.17%
1911	1,206	−1.81%
1921	1,191	−0.13%
1926	1,125	−1.13%
1931	1,101	−0.43%
1936	1,042	−1.10%
1946	997	−0.44%
1954	1,003	+0.08%
1962	957	−0.59%
1968	973	+0.28%
1975	1,055	+1.16%
1982	1,258	+2.55%
1990	1,502	+2.24%
1999	1,816	+2.13%
2007	2,097	+1.81%
2012	2,155	+0.55%
2017	2,252	+0.88%
2023	2,285	+0.24%

Source: EHESS and INSEE (1968-2023)

== See also ==
- Communes of the Isère department
