= Saint-Alban-du-Rhône =

- Commune
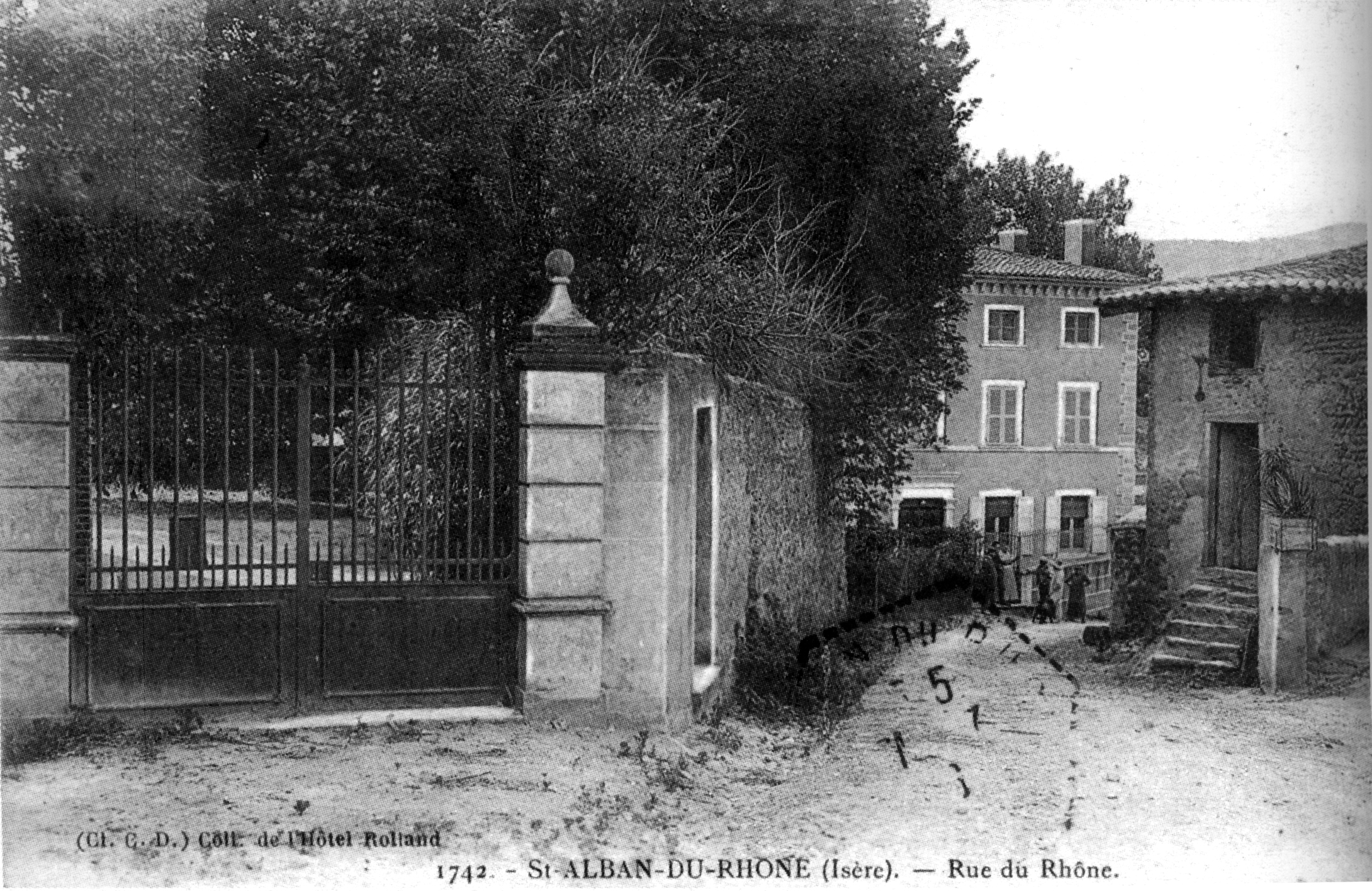
- Saint-Alban-du-Rhone in 1925
- Location of Saint-Alban-du-Rhône
- Location within France Location within Auvergne-Rhône-Alpes
- Coordinates: 45°25′39″N 4°45′22″E
- Country: France
- Region: Auvergne-Rhône-Alpes
- Department: Isère
- Arrondissement: Vienne
- Canton: Vienne-2

Government
  - Mayor (2024–2026): Jean-Pierre Chardon
- Area^{1}: 3.56 km^{2} (1.37 sq mi)
- Elevation: 200 m (660 ft)
- Highest elevation: 166 m (545 ft)
- Lowest elevation: 149 m (489 ft)
- Population (2023): 965
  - Density: 271/km^{2} (702/sq mi)
- Time zone: UTC+01:00 (CET)
  - Summer (DST): UTC+02:00 (CEST)
- INSEE/Postal code: 38353 /38370
- ^{1} French Land Register data, which excludes lakes, ponds, glaciers > 1 km^{2} (0.386 sq mi or 247 acres) and river estuaries.

Saint-Alban-du-Rhône (French pronunciation: [sɛ̃.t‿albɑ̃ dy ʁon]) is a commune in the Isère department in southeastern France.

== Population ==
Historical population
Year	Pop.	±% p.a.
1968	355	—
1975	366	+0.44%
1982	490	+4.26%
1990	672	+4.03%
1999	840	+2.51%
2007	880	+0.58%
2012	845	−0.81%
2017	842	−0.07%
2023	965	+2.30%
Source: INSEE

== See also ==
- Communes of the Isère department
