= Saint-Maurice-l'Exil =

- Commune
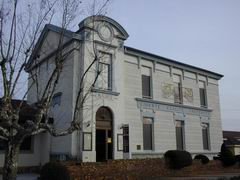
- Town hall
- Location of Saint-Maurice-l'Exil
- Location within France Location within Auvergne-Rhône-Alpes
- Coordinates: 45°24′00″N 4°46′59″E
- Country: France
- Region: Auvergne-Rhône-Alpes
- Department: Isère
- Arrondissement: Vienne
- Canton: Vienne-2

Government
  - Mayor (2020–2026): Philippe Genty
- Area^{1}: 12.82 km^{2} (4.95 sq mi)
- Elevation: 120 m (390 ft)
- Highest elevation: 265 m (869 ft)
- Lowest elevation: 139 m (456 ft)
- Population (2023): 6,889
  - Density: 537.4/km^{2} (1,392/sq mi)
- Time zone: UTC+01:00 (CET)
  - Summer (DST): UTC+02:00 (CEST)
- INSEE/Postal code: 38425 /38550
- ^{1} French Land Register data, which excludes lakes, ponds, glaciers > 1 km^{2} (0.386 sq mi or 247 acres) and river estuaries.

Saint-Maurice-l'Exil (French pronunciation: [sɛ̃ mɔʁis lɛɡzil]) is a commune in the Isère department in southeastern France.

== Population ==
Historical population

Year	Pop.	±% p.a.
1800	545	—
1806	679	+3.73%
1821	692	+0.13%
1831	922	+2.91%
1836	817	−2.39%
1841	970	+3.49%
1846	984	+0.29%
1851	1,005	+0.42%
1856	1,008	+0.06%
1861	1,077	+1.33%
1866	1,138	+1.11%
1872	1,144	+0.09%
1876	1,008	−3.11%
1881	991	−0.34%
1886	1,014	+0.46%
1891	1,026	+0.24%
1896	1,121	+1.79%
1901	1,084	−0.67%

Year	Pop.	±% p.a.
1906	844	−4.88%
1911	825	−0.45%
1921	969	+1.62%
1926	974	+0.10%
1931	976	+0.04%
1936	1,113	+2.66%
1946	1,087	−0.24%
1954	1,352	+2.76%
1962	2,568	+8.35%
1968	3,433	+4.96%
1975	3,735	+1.21%
1982	4,070	+1.23%
1990	5,218	+3.15%
1999	5,515	+0.62%
2007	5,523	+0.02%
2012	5,995	+1.65%
2017	6,141	+0.48%
2023	6,889	+1.93%

Source: EHESS and INSEE (1968-2023)

== See also ==
- Communes of the Isère department
