= Beaufort, Isère =

Beaufort
- Commune
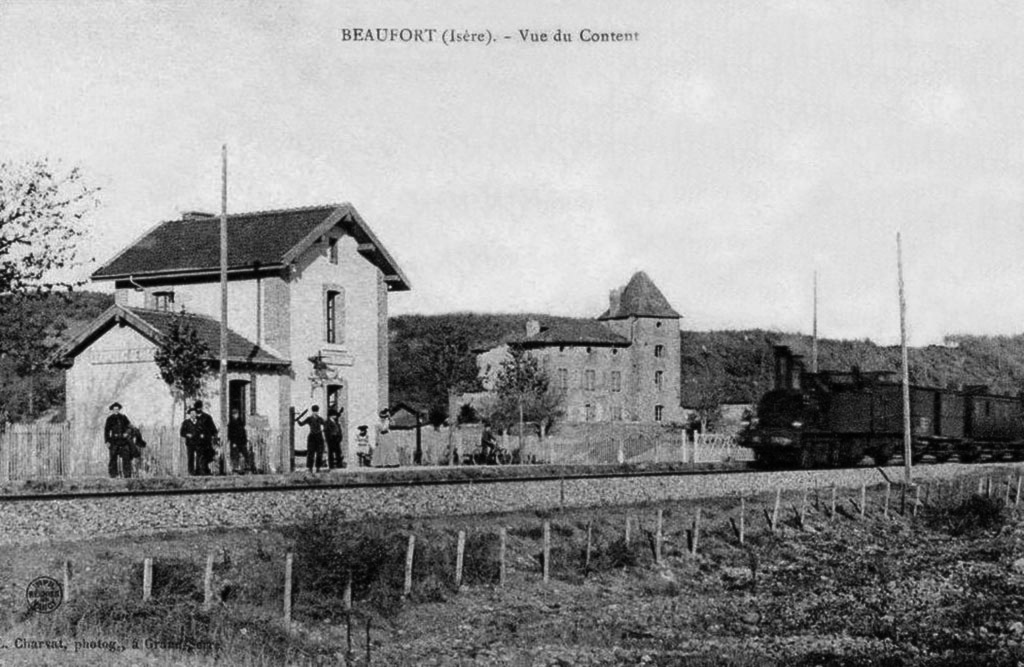
- Beaufort at the beginning of the 20th century
- Location of Beaufort
- Location within France Location within Auvergne-Rhône-Alpes
- Coordinates: 45°19′38″N 5°07′21″E
- Country: France
- Region: Auvergne-Rhône-Alpes
- Department: Isère
- Arrondissement: Vienne
- Canton: Bièvre

Government
  - Mayor (2020–2026): Christiane d'Ornano
- Area^{1}: 8.69 km^{2} (3.36 sq mi)
- Elevation: 280 m (920 ft)
- Highest elevation: 374 m (1,227 ft)
- Lowest elevation: 266 m (873 ft)
- Population (2023): 573
  - Density: 65.9/km^{2} (171/sq mi)
- Time zone: UTC+01:00 (CET)
  - Summer (DST): UTC+02:00 (CEST)
- INSEE/Postal code: 38032 /38270
- ^{1} French Land Register data, which excludes lakes, ponds, glaciers > 1 km^{2} (0.386 sq mi or 247 acres) and river estuaries.

Beaufort (French pronunciation: [bofɔʁ]) is a commune in the Isère department in the Auvergne-Rhône-Alpes region of south-eastern France.

== Geography ==
Beaufort is located some 50 km north-east of Grenoble and 8 km east of Beaurepaire. Access to the commune is by the D73 road which changes to the D519D then the D519 from Lapeyrouse-Mornay in the east which passes through the commune north of the village and continues east, changing again to the D519, to Marcilloles. Access to the village is by the D73C which branches from the D73 in the commune and continues south to join the D130 just outside the commune. the D156B branches from the D73 in the commune and goes south-east to Thodure. Apart from the village there are the hamlets of Bas Beaufort and Chantabot. The commune is entirely farmland.

La Raille stream flows through the commune from north-west to south-east where it continues to join the Torrent de la Perouse at Viriville. In the north-west of the commune are canals and ponds for a fish farm.

== Toponymy ==
Beaufort appears as Beaufort on the 1750 Cassini Map and the same on the 1790 version.

== Administration ==
List of Successive Mayors

| From | To | Name |
|---|---|---|
| 2001 | 2020 | Norbert Bouvier |
| 2020 | 2026 | Christiane d'Ornano |

== Demography ==
The inhabitants of the commune are known as Beaufortois or Beaufortoises.

Historical population

| Year | Pop. | ±% p.a. |
|---|---|---|
| 1793 | 425 | — |
| 1821 | 601 | +1.25% |
| 1846 | 704 | +0.63% |
| 1872 | 596 | −0.64% |
| 1901 | 460 | −0.89% |
| 1921 | 408 | −0.60% |
| 1931 | 376 | −0.81% |
| 1946 | 354 | −0.40% |
| 1962 | 380 | +0.44% |

| Year | Pop. | ±% p.a. |
|---|---|---|
| 1968 | 373 | −0.31% |
| 1975 | 337 | −1.44% |
| 1982 | 369 | +1.30% |
| 1990 | 406 | +1.20% |
| 1999 | 415 | +0.24% |
| 2007 | 531 | +3.13% |
| 2012 | 577 | +1.68% |
| 2017 | 548 | −1.03% |
| 2023 | 573 | +0.75% |

Source: EHESS and INSEE

== Culture and heritage ==
- The Fountains of Beaufort are classed as a Sensitive natural area.

== Notable people linked to the commune ==
- Joseph Vacher (1869–1896), a criminal, considered to be one of the first serial killers in France was born in the commune.

== See also ==
- Communes of the Isère department
