= Faramans =

Faramans is the name of two communes in France:

- Faramans, Ain
- Faramans, Isère
