= Saint-Michel-de-Saint-Geoirs =

- Commune
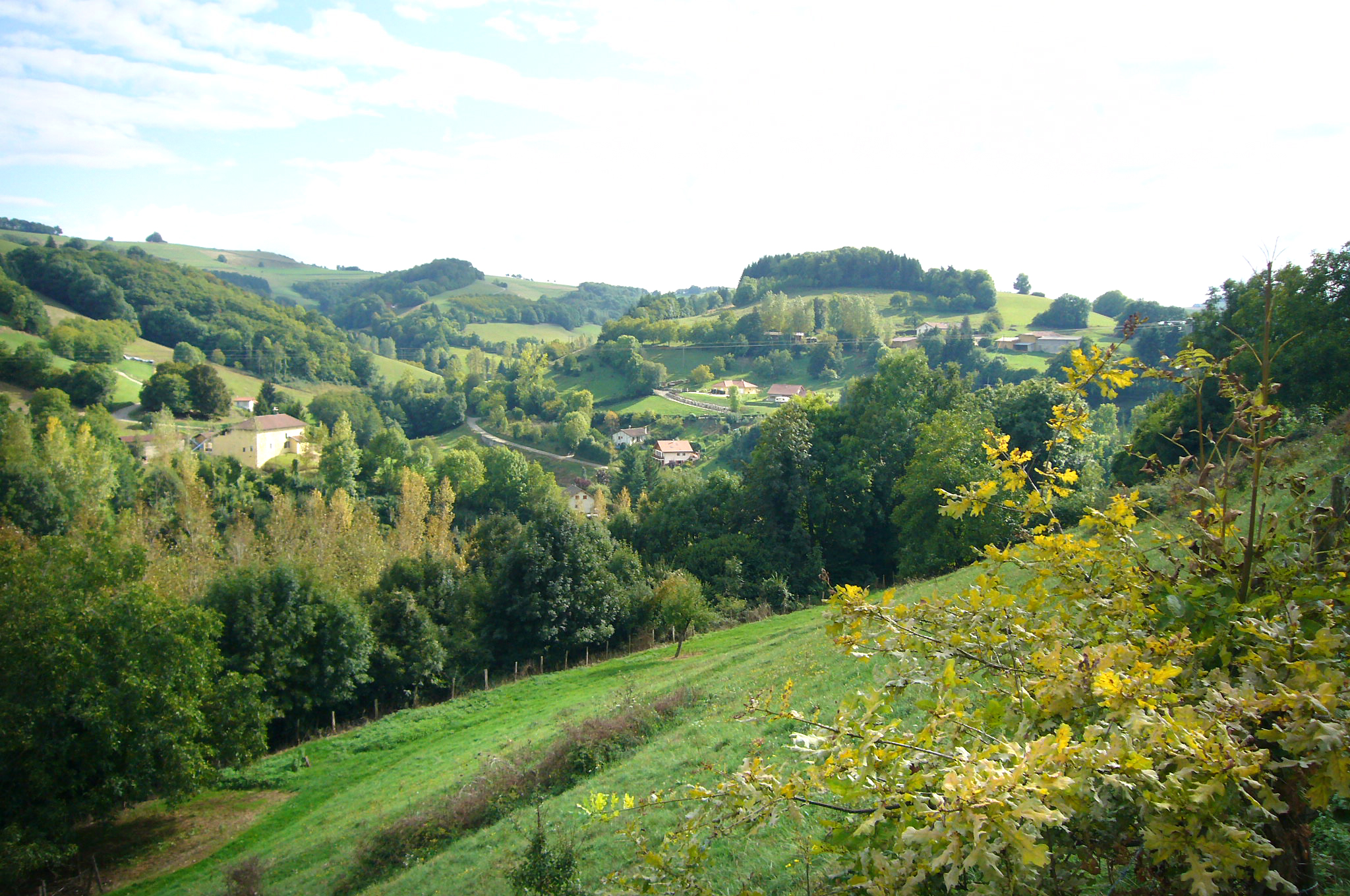
- A general view of Saint-Michel-de-Saint-Geoirs
- Location of Saint-Michel-de-Saint-Geoirs
- Location within France Location within Auvergne-Rhône-Alpes
- Coordinates: 45°18′22″N 5°21′23″E
- Country: France
- Region: Auvergne-Rhône-Alpes
- Department: Isère
- Arrondissement: Vienne
- Canton: Bièvre

Government
  - Mayor (2020–2026): Joël Mabily
- Area^{1}: 7.14 km^{2} (2.76 sq mi)
- Elevation: 560 m (1,840 ft)
- Highest elevation: 728 m (2,388 ft)
- Lowest elevation: 459 m (1,506 ft)
- Population (2023): 281
  - Density: 39.4/km^{2} (102/sq mi)
- Time zone: UTC+01:00 (CET)
  - Summer (DST): UTC+02:00 (CEST)
- INSEE/Postal code: 38427 /38590
- Website: www.st-michel-de-st-geoirs.fr
- ^{1} French Land Register data, which excludes lakes, ponds, glaciers > 1 km^{2} (0.386 sq mi or 247 acres) and river estuaries.

Saint-Michel-de-Saint-Geoirs (French pronunciation: [sɛ̃ miʃɛl də sɛ̃ ʒwaʁ], literally Saint-Michel of Saint-Geoirs) is a commune in the Isère department in southeastern France.

== Population ==
Historical population
Year	Pop.	±% p.a.
1968	224	—
1975	203	−1.40%
1982	237	+2.24%
1990	222	−0.81%
1999	247	+1.19%
2007	310	+2.88%
2012	302	−0.52%
2017	304	+0.13%
2023	281	−1.30%
Source: INSEE

== See also ==
- Communes of the Isère department
