= Saint-Hilaire-de-la-Côte =

- Commune
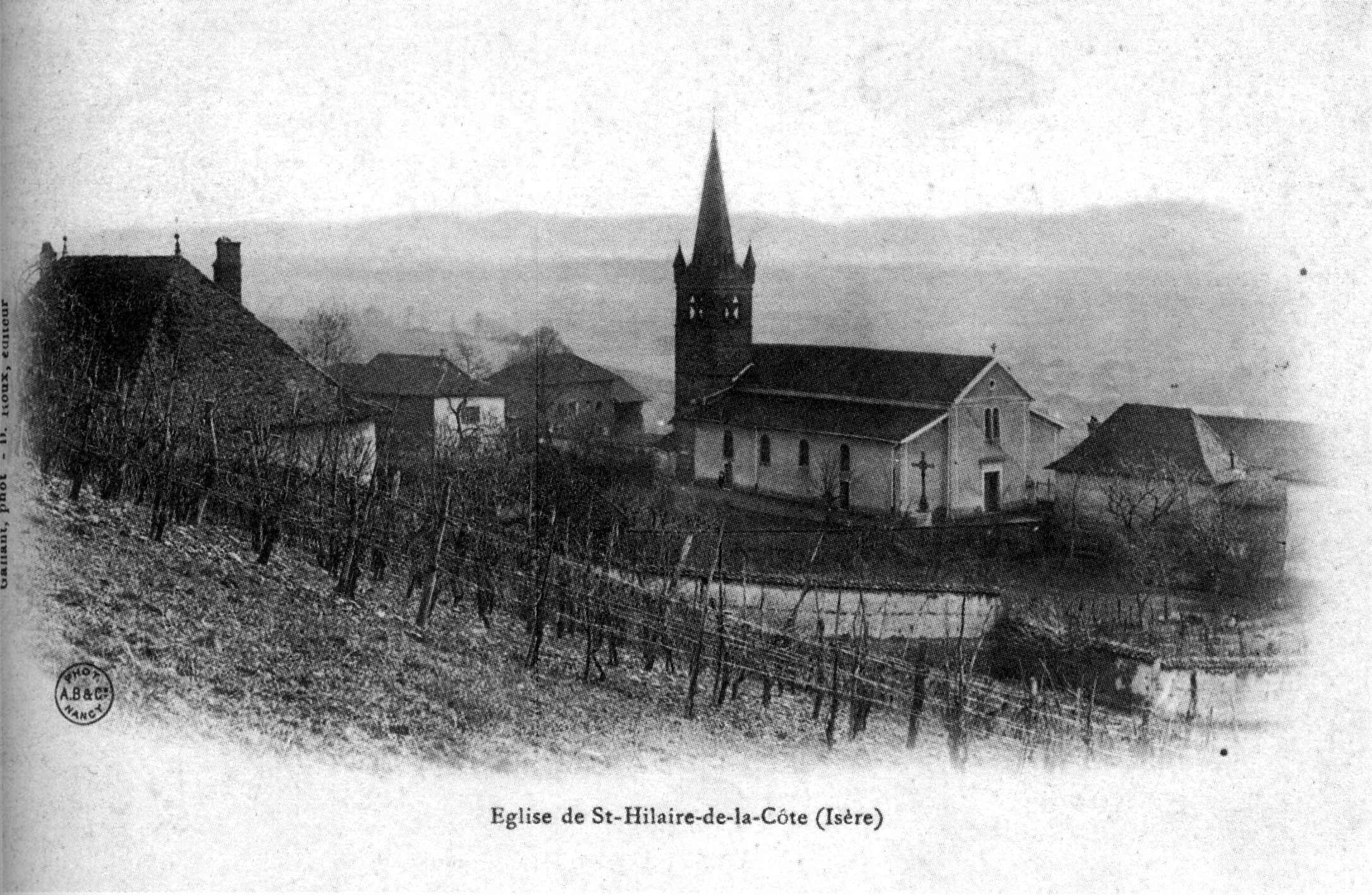
- Saint-Hilaire-de-la-Cote in 1904
- Location of Saint-Hilaire-de-la-Côte
- Location within France Location within Auvergne-Rhône-Alpes
- Coordinates: 45°23′29″N 5°19′41″E
- Country: France
- Region: Auvergne-Rhône-Alpes
- Department: Isère
- Arrondissement: Vienne
- Canton: Bièvre

Government
  - Mayor (2021–2026): Catherine Carron
- Area^{1}: 13.75 km^{2} (5.31 sq mi)
- Elevation: 400 m (1,300 ft)
- Highest elevation: 647 m (2,123 ft)
- Lowest elevation: 361 m (1,184 ft)
- Population (2023): 1,600
  - Density: 120/km^{2} (300/sq mi)
- Time zone: UTC+01:00 (CET)
  - Summer (DST): UTC+02:00 (CEST)
- INSEE/Postal code: 38393 /38260
- ^{1} French Land Register data, which excludes lakes, ponds, glaciers > 1 km^{2} (0.386 sq mi or 247 acres) and river estuaries.

Saint-Hilaire-de-la-Côte (French pronunciation: [sɛ̃.t‿ilɛʁ də lakot]) is a commune in the Isère department in southeastern France.

== Population ==
Historical population
Year	Pop.	±% p.a.
1968	564	—
1975	531	−0.86%
1982	802	+6.07%
1990	1,001	+2.81%
1999	1,106	+1.11%
2007	1,347	+2.49%
2012	1,422	+1.09%
2017	1,504	+1.13%
2023	1,600	+1.04%
Source: INSEE

== See also ==
- Communes of the Isère department
