= Brion, Isère =

Brion
- Commune
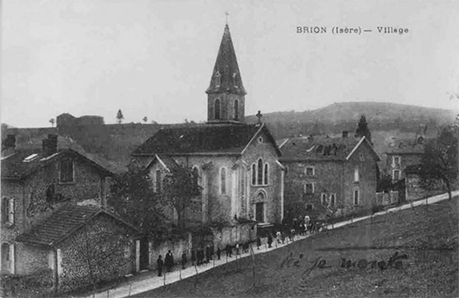
- The village of Brion at the start of the 20th century
- Location of Brion
- Location within France Location within Auvergne-Rhône-Alpes
- Coordinates: 45°17′36″N 5°20′20″E
- Country: France
- Region: Auvergne-Rhône-Alpes
- Department: Isère
- Arrondissement: Vienne
- Canton: Bièvre

Government
  - Mayor (2020–2026): Thierry Dubuc
- Area^{1}: 3.94 km^{2} (1.52 sq mi)
- Elevation: 575 m (1,886 ft)
- Highest elevation: 724 m (2,375 ft)
- Lowest elevation: 466 m (1,529 ft)
- Population (2023): 141
  - Density: 35.8/km^{2} (92.7/sq mi)
- Time zone: UTC+01:00 (CET)
  - Summer (DST): UTC+02:00 (CEST)
- INSEE/Postal code: 38060 /38590
- ^{1} French Land Register data, which excludes lakes, ponds, glaciers > 1 km^{2} (0.386 sq mi or 247 acres) and river estuaries.

Brion (French pronunciation: [bʁijɔ̃]) is a commune in the Isère department in southeastern France.

== Population ==
Historical population
| Year | Pop. | ±% p.a. |
|---|---|---|
| 1968 | 133 | — |
| 1975 | 134 | +0.11% |
| 1982 | 128 | −0.65% |
| 1990 | 132 | +0.39% |
| 1999 | 138 | +0.50% |
| 2007 | 128 | −0.94% |
| 2012 | 134 | +0.92% |
| 2017 | 144 | +1.45% |
| 2023 | 141 | −0.35% |
Source: INSEE

== See also ==
- Communes of the Isère department
