= La Forteresse =

- Commune
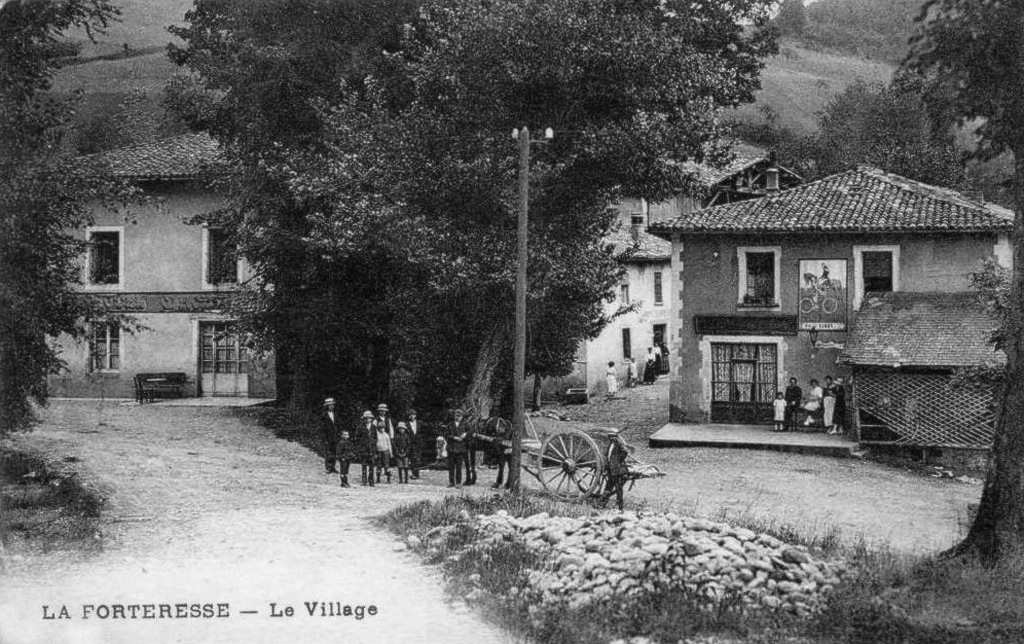
- An old view of La Forteresse
- Location of La Forteresse
- Location within France Location within Auvergne-Rhône-Alpes
- Coordinates: 45°17′44″N 5°24′15″E
- Country: France
- Region: Auvergne-Rhône-Alpes
- Department: Isère
- Arrondissement: Vienne
- Canton: Bièvre

Government
  - Mayor (2020–2026): Evelyne Collet
- Area^{1}: 9.22 km^{2} (3.56 sq mi)
- Highest elevation: 773 m (2,536 ft)
- Lowest elevation: 503 m (1,650 ft)
- Population (2023): 338
  - Density: 36.7/km^{2} (94.9/sq mi)
- Time zone: UTC+01:00 (CET)
  - Summer (DST): UTC+02:00 (CEST)
- INSEE/Postal code: 38171 /38590
- ^{1} French Land Register data, which excludes lakes, ponds, glaciers > 1 km^{2} (0.386 sq mi or 247 acres) and river estuaries.

La Forteresse (French pronunciation: [la fɔʁtəʁɛs]) is a commune in the Isère department in southeastern France.

== Geography ==
La Forteresse is located in the valley of Rival, and is about 550 meters away from Saint-Étienne-de-Saint-Geoirs.

== History ==
La Forteresse belonged until 1929 to the canton of Tullins. Then, on 17 December 1929, it was attached to the canton of Saint-Étienne-de-Saint-Geoirs. Since 2015, it is part of the canton of Bièvre.

== Population ==
Historical population
Year	Pop.	±% p.a.
1968	262	—
1975	250	−0.67%
1982	245	−0.29%
1990	251	+0.30%
1999	235	−0.73%
2007	291	+2.71%
2012	318	+1.79%
2017	322	+0.25%
2023	338	+0.81%
Source: INSEE

== See also ==
- Communes of the Isère department
