= Bossieu =

- Commune
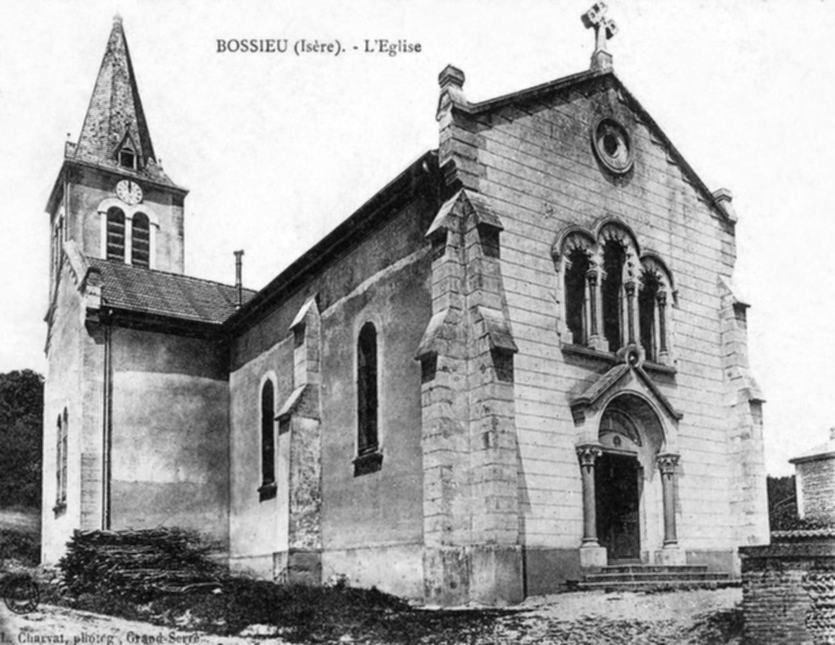
- The church of Bossieu at the start of the 20th century
- Location of Bossieu
- Location within France Location within Auvergne-Rhône-Alpes
- Coordinates: 45°25′04″N 5°08′55″E
- Country: France
- Region: Auvergne-Rhône-Alpes
- Department: Isère
- Arrondissement: Vienne
- Canton: Bièvre

Government
  - Mayor (2020–2026): Thierry Collion
- Area^{1}: 13.48 km^{2} (5.20 sq mi)
- Elevation: 450 m (1,480 ft)
- Highest elevation: 524 m (1,719 ft)
- Lowest elevation: 361 m (1,184 ft)
- Population (2023): 326
  - Density: 24.2/km^{2} (62.6/sq mi)
- Time zone: UTC+01:00 (CET)
  - Summer (DST): UTC+02:00 (CEST)
- INSEE/Postal code: 38049 /38260
- ^{1} French Land Register data, which excludes lakes, ponds, glaciers > 1 km^{2} (0.386 sq mi or 247 acres) and river estuaries.

Bossieu (French pronunciation: [bɔsjø]) is a commune in the Isère department in southeastern France.

== Population ==
Historical population
Year	Pop.	±% p.a.
1968	212	—
1975	209	−0.20%
1982	212	+0.20%
1990	241	+1.62%
1999	277	+1.56%
2007	276	−0.05%
2012	266	−0.74%
2017	294	+2.02%
2023	326	+1.74%
Source: INSEE

== See also ==
- Communes of the Isère department
