= Brézins =

- Commune
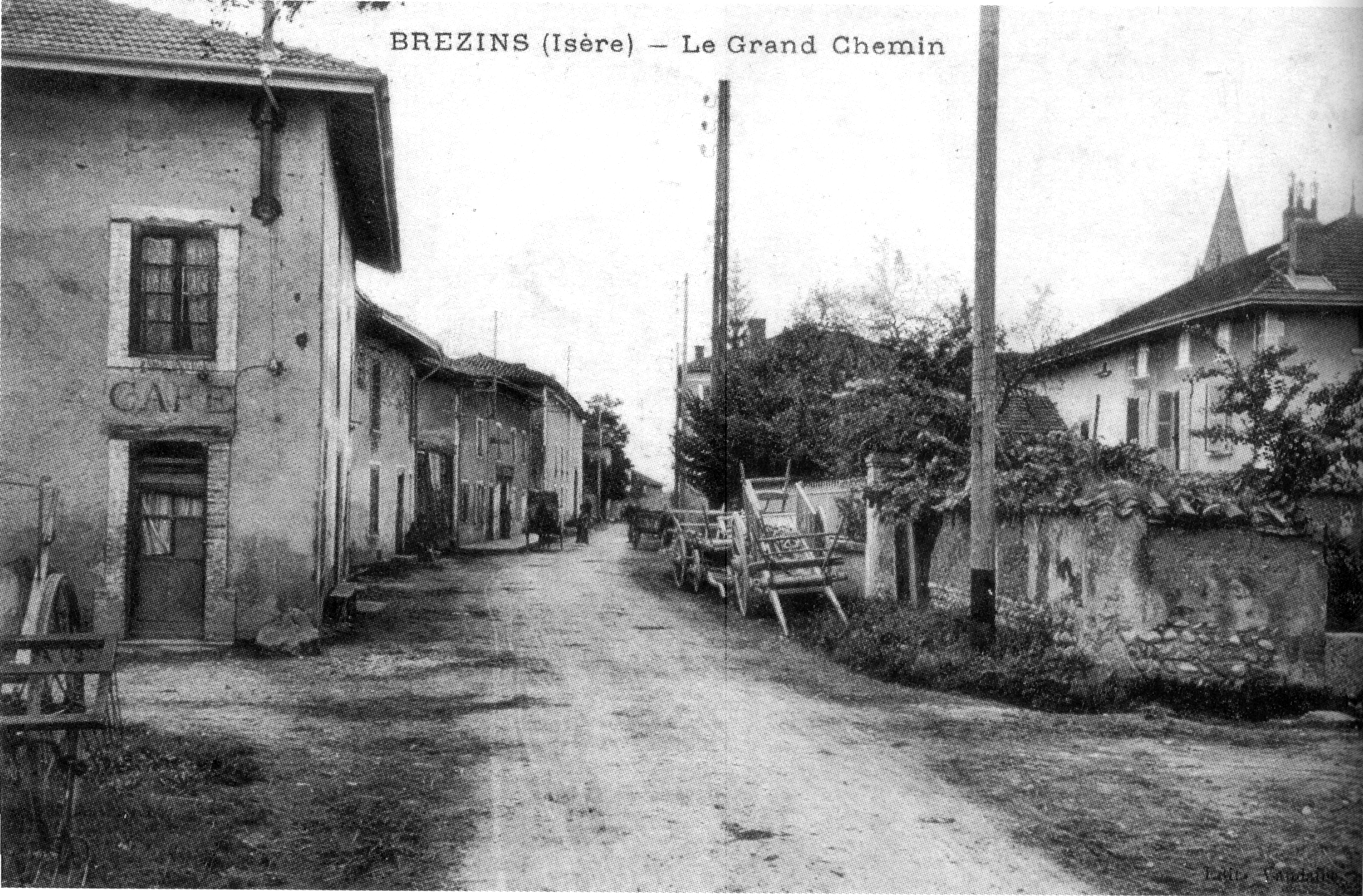
- The main road in 1912
- Location of Brézins
- Location within France Location within Auvergne-Rhône-Alpes
- Coordinates: 45°21′00″N 5°18′27″E
- Country: France
- Region: Auvergne-Rhône-Alpes
- Department: Isère
- Arrondissement: Vienne
- Canton: Bièvre

Government
  - Mayor (2020–2026): Gilles Gelas
- Area^{1}: 8.26 km^{2} (3.19 sq mi)
- Elevation: 365 m (1,198 ft)
- Highest elevation: 407 m (1,335 ft)
- Lowest elevation: 356 m (1,168 ft)
- Population (2023): 2,312
  - Density: 280/km^{2} (725/sq mi)
- Time zone: UTC+01:00 (CET)
  - Summer (DST): UTC+02:00 (CEST)
- INSEE/Postal code: 38058 /38590
- ^{1} French Land Register data, which excludes lakes, ponds, glaciers > 1 km^{2} (0.386 sq mi or 247 acres) and river estuaries.

Brézins (French pronunciation: [bʁezɛ̃]) is a commune in the Isère department in southeastern France.

== Population ==
Historical population
Year	Pop.	±% p.a.
1968	671	—
1975	836	+3.19%
1982	1,013	+2.78%
1990	1,245	+2.61%
1999	1,326	+0.70%
2007	1,567	+2.11%
2012	1,849	+3.37%
2017	2,132	+2.89%
2023	2,312	+1.36%
Source: INSEE

== See also ==
- Communes of the Isère department
