= Gillonnay =

- Commune
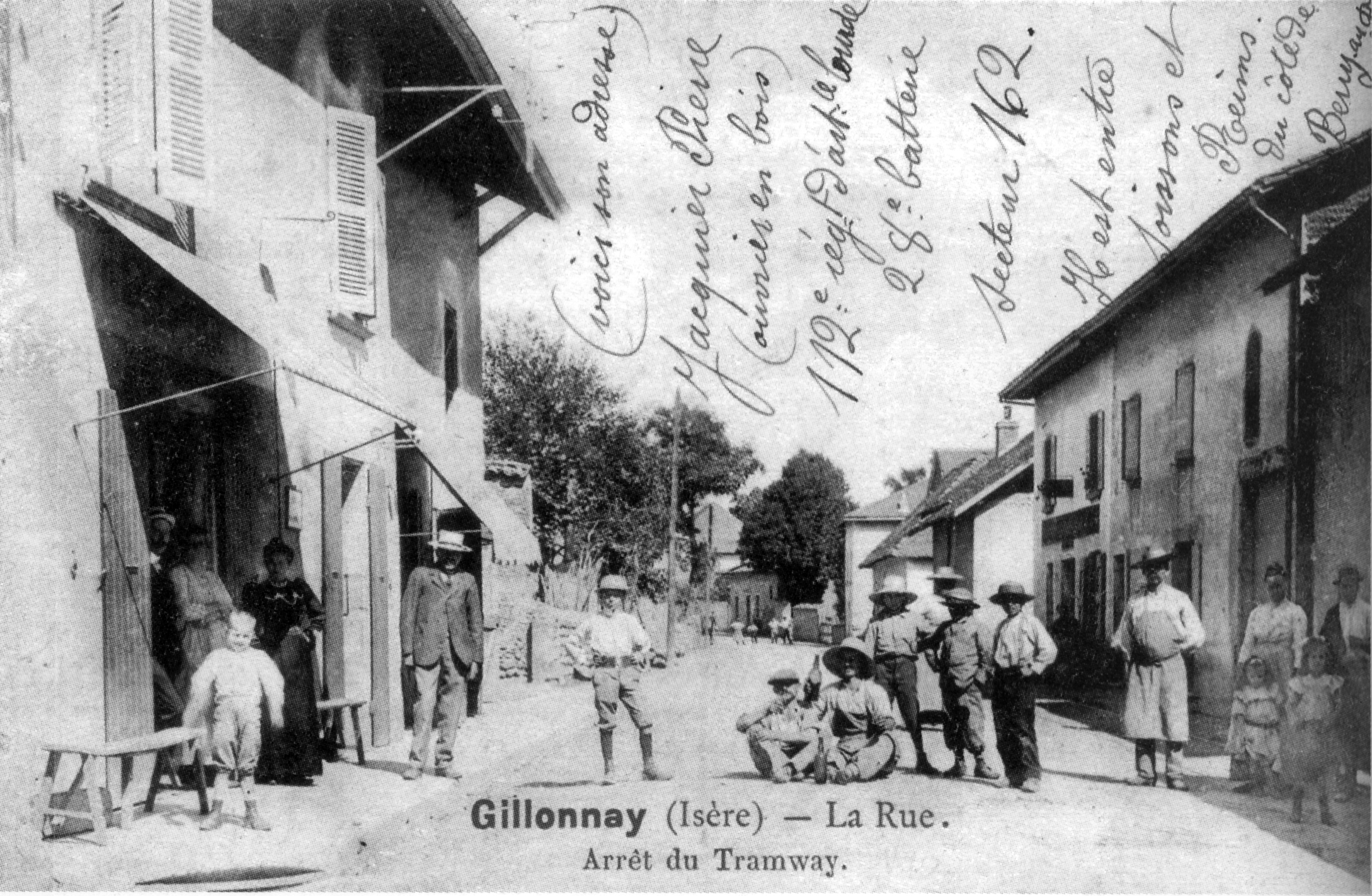
- Gillonnay in 1908
- Location of Gillonnay
- Location within France Location within Auvergne-Rhône-Alpes
- Coordinates: 45°23′37″N 5°17′52″E
- Country: France
- Region: Auvergne-Rhône-Alpes
- Department: Isère
- Arrondissement: Vienne
- Canton: Bièvre
- Intercommunality: Bièvre Isère

Government
  - Mayor (2020–2026): Jean-Paul Jullien-Vieroz
- Area^{1}: 14.29 km^{2} (5.52 sq mi)
- Elevation: 380 m (1,250 ft)
- Highest elevation: 633 m (2,077 ft)
- Lowest elevation: 346 m (1,135 ft)
- Population (2023): 1,009
  - Density: 70.61/km^{2} (182.9/sq mi)
- Time zone: UTC+01:00 (CET)
  - Summer (DST): UTC+02:00 (CEST)
- INSEE/Postal code: 38180 /38260
- ^{1} French Land Register data, which excludes lakes, ponds, glaciers > 1 km^{2} (0.386 sq mi or 247 acres) and river estuaries.

Gillonnay (French pronunciation: [ʒijɔnɛ]) is a commune in the Isère department in southeastern France.

== Population ==
Historical population
Year	Pop.	±% p.a.
1968	541	—
1975	564	+0.60%
1982	656	+2.18%
1990	704	+0.89%
1999	825	+1.78%
2007	934	+1.56%
2012	975	+0.86%
2017	1,012	+0.75%
2023	1,009	−0.05%
Source: INSEE

== See also ==
- Communes of the Isère department
