= Canton of Bièvre =

Coordinates: 45.39°N 5.26°E

The canton of Bièvre is an administrative division of the Isère department, eastern France. It was created at the French canton reorganisation which came into effect in March 2015. Its seat is in La Côte-Saint-André.

It consists of the following communes:

1. Beaufort
2. Beauvoir-de-Marc
3. Bossieu
4. Bressieux
5. Brézins
6. Brion
7. Champier
8. Châtenay
9. Châtonnay
10. La Côte-Saint-André
11. Faramans
12. La Forteresse
13. La Frette
14. Gillonnay
15. Lentiol
16. Lieudieu
17. Marcilloles
18. Marcollin
19. Marnans
20. Meyssiez
21. Montfalcon
22. Mottier
23. Ornacieux-Balbins
24. Pajay
25. Penol
26. Plan
27. Porte-des-Bonnevaux
28. Royas
29. Roybon
30. Saint-Clair-sur-Galaure
31. Sainte-Anne-sur-Gervonde
32. Saint-Étienne-de-Saint-Geoirs
33. Saint-Geoirs
34. Saint-Hilaire-de-la-Côte
35. Saint-Michel-de-Saint-Geoirs
36. Saint-Paul-d'Izeaux
37. Saint-Pierre-de-Bressieux
38. Saint-Siméon-de-Bressieux
39. Sardieu
40. Savas-Mépin
41. Sillans
42. Thodure
43. Villeneuve-de-Marc
44. Viriville
