= Champier =

- Commune
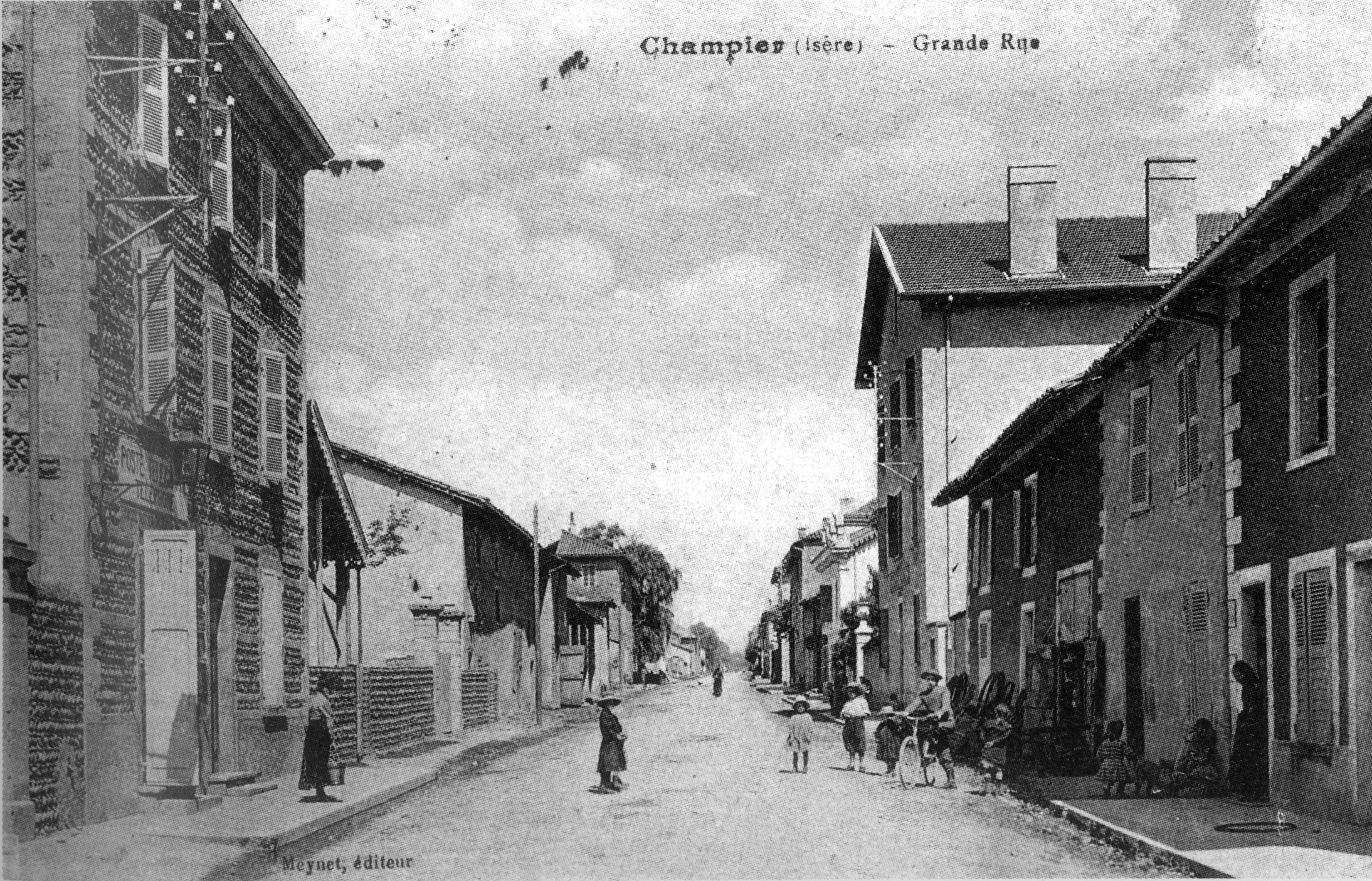
- The main road in 1922
- Location of Champier
- Location within France Location within Auvergne-Rhône-Alpes
- Coordinates: 45°27′15″N 5°17′30″E
- Country: France
- Region: Auvergne-Rhône-Alpes
- Department: Isère
- Arrondissement: Vienne
- Canton: Bièvre

Government
  - Mayor (2020–2026): Sébastien Laroche
- Area^{1}: 14.43 km^{2} (5.57 sq mi)
- Elevation: 507 m (1,663 ft)
- Highest elevation: 631 m (2,070 ft)
- Lowest elevation: 470 m (1,540 ft)
- Population (2023): 1,582
  - Density: 109.6/km^{2} (283.9/sq mi)
- Time zone: UTC+01:00 (CET)
  - Summer (DST): UTC+02:00 (CEST)
- INSEE/Postal code: 38069 /38260
- ^{1} French Land Register data, which excludes lakes, ponds, glaciers > 1 km^{2} (0.386 sq mi or 247 acres) and river estuaries.

Champier (French pronunciation: [ʃɑ̃pje]) is a commune in the Isère department in southeastern France.

== Population ==
Historical population
Year	Pop.	±% p.a.
1968	741	—
1975	757	+0.31%
1982	832	+1.36%
1990	873	+0.60%
1999	967	+1.14%
2007	1,120	+1.85%
2012	1,302	+3.06%
2017	1,400	+1.46%
2023	1,582	+2.06%
Source: INSEE

== See also ==
- Communes of the Isère department
