= Sainte-Anne-sur-Gervonde =

- Commune
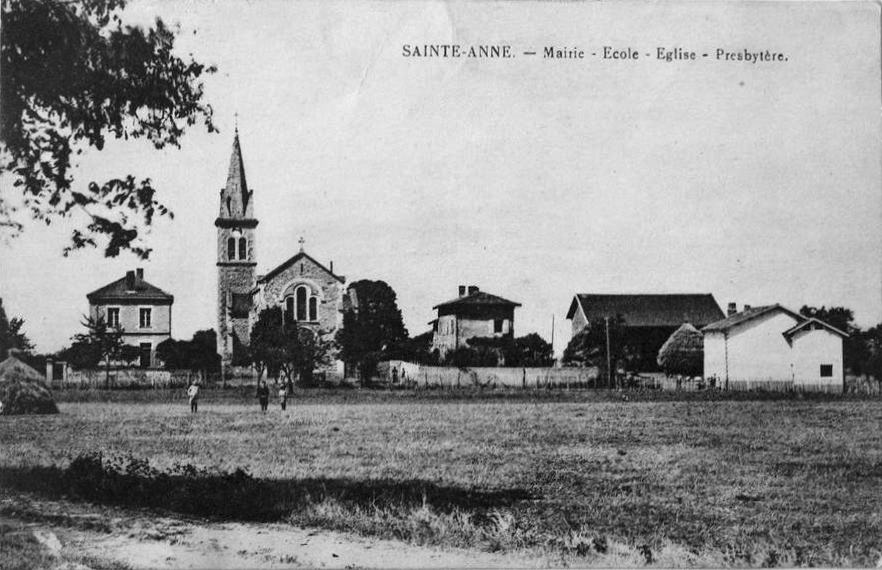
- Sainte-Anne-d'Estrablin in 1931
- Location of Sainte-Anne-sur-Gervonde
- Location within France Location within Auvergne-Rhône-Alpes
- Coordinates: 45°30′01″N 5°14′03″E
- Country: France
- Region: Auvergne-Rhône-Alpes
- Department: Isère
- Arrondissement: Vienne
- Canton: Bièvre

Government
  - Mayor (2020–2026): Pascal Compigne
- Area^{1}: 7.67 km^{2} (2.96 sq mi)
- Elevation: 500 m (1,600 ft)
- Highest elevation: 546 m (1,791 ft)
- Lowest elevation: 426 m (1,398 ft)
- Population (2023): 759
  - Density: 99.0/km^{2} (256/sq mi)
- Time zone: UTC+01:00 (CET)
  - Summer (DST): UTC+02:00 (CEST)
- INSEE/Postal code: 38358 /38440
- ^{1} French Land Register data, which excludes lakes, ponds, glaciers > 1 km^{2} (0.386 sq mi or 247 acres) and river estuaries.

Sainte-Anne-sur-Gervonde (French pronunciation: [sɛ̃t an syʁ ʒɛʁvɔ̃d]) is a commune in the Isère department in southeastern France.

== Population ==
Historical population
Year	Pop.	±% p.a.
1968	269	—
1975	270	+0.05%
1982	283	+0.67%
1990	337	+2.21%
1999	399	+1.89%
2007	565	+4.44%
2012	604	+1.34%
2017	692	+2.76%
2023	759	+1.55%
Source: INSEE

== See also ==
- Communes of the Isère department
