= Royas =

- Commune
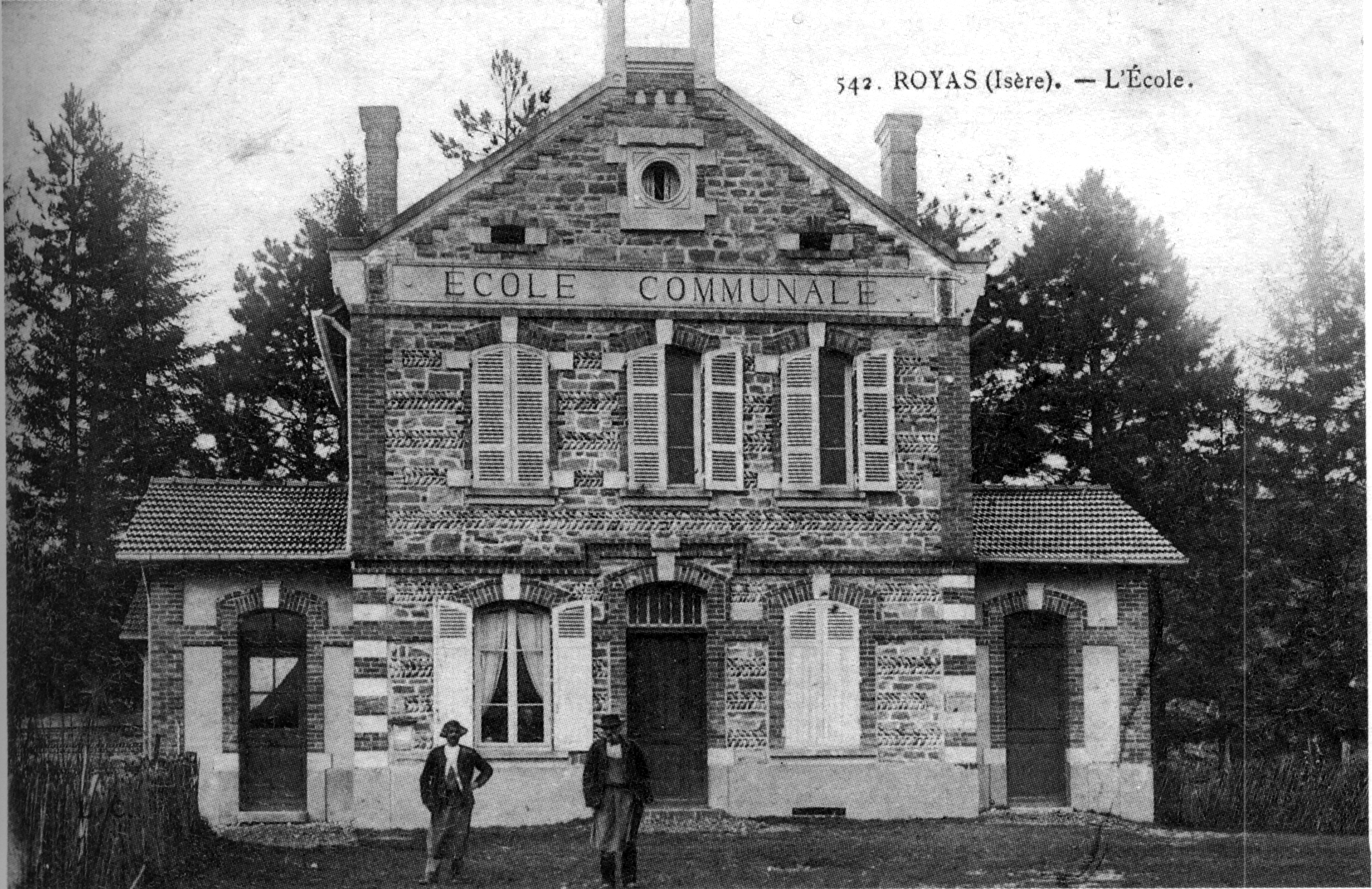
- The school of Royas in 1909

- Coat of arms
- Location of Royas
- Location within France Location within Auvergne-Rhône-Alpes
- Coordinates: 45°30′24″N 5°06′18″E
- Country: France
- Region: Auvergne-Rhône-Alpes
- Department: Isère
- Arrondissement: Vienne
- Canton: Bièvre

Government
  - Mayor (2020–2026): Thierry Rolland
- Area^{1}: 5.48 km^{2} (2.12 sq mi)
- Elevation: 320 m (1,050 ft)
- Highest elevation: 472 m (1,549 ft)
- Lowest elevation: 329 m (1,079 ft)
- Population (2023): 427
  - Density: 77.9/km^{2} (202/sq mi)
- Time zone: UTC+01:00 (CET)
  - Summer (DST): UTC+02:00 (CEST)
- INSEE/Postal code: 38346 /38440
- ^{1} French Land Register data, which excludes lakes, ponds, glaciers > 1 km^{2} (0.386 sq mi or 247 acres) and river estuaries.

Royas (French pronunciation: [ʁwaja]) is a commune in the Isère department in southeastern France.

== Population ==
Historical population
Year	Pop.	±% p.a.
1968	174	—
1975	174	+0.00%
1982	272	+6.59%
1990	308	+1.57%
1999	305	−0.11%
2007	358	+2.02%
2012	385	+1.46%
2017	396	+0.57%
2023	427	+1.26%
Source: INSEE

== See also ==
- Communes of the Isère department
