= Marnans =

- Commune
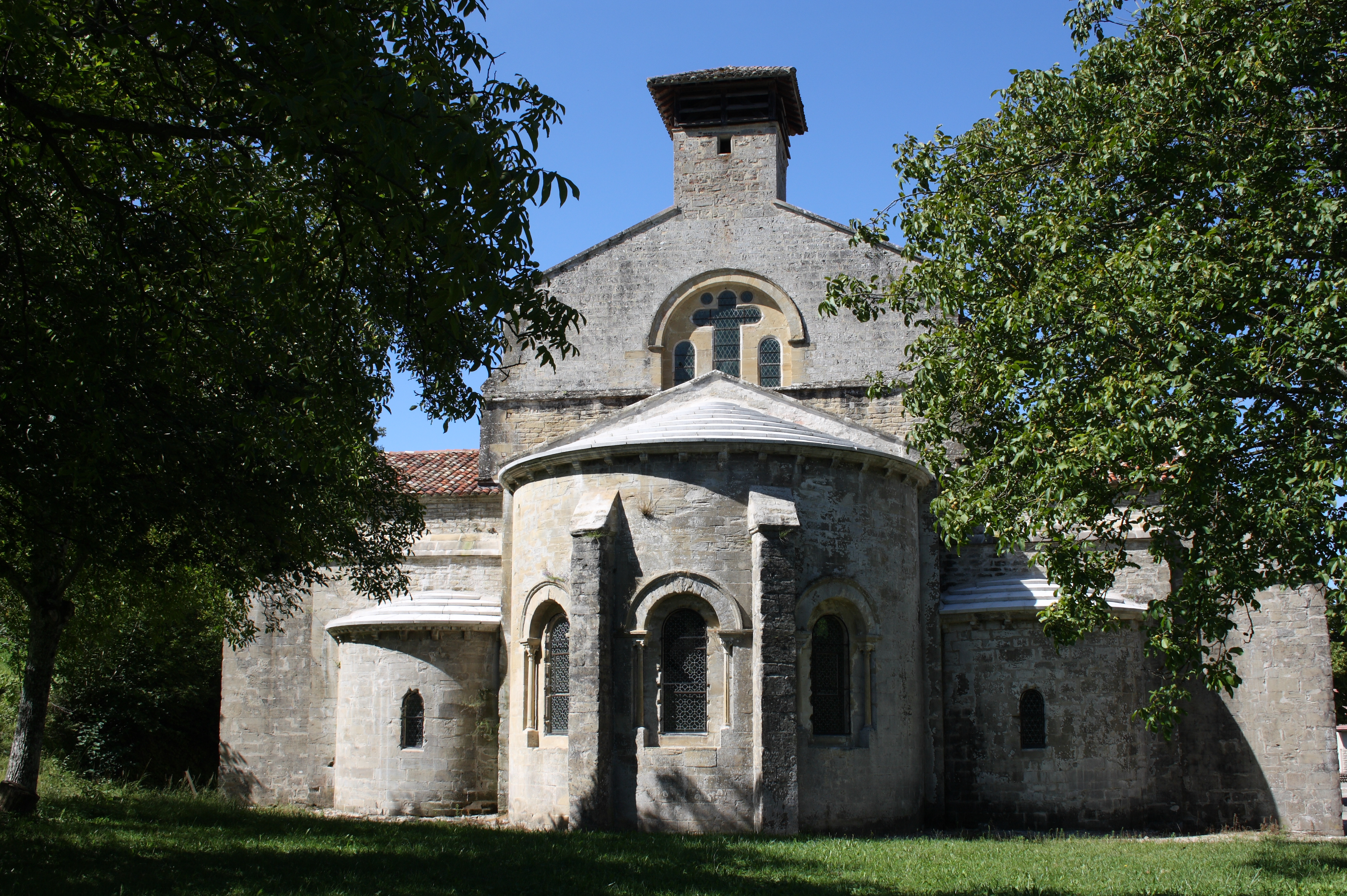
- The church of Saint-Pierre
- Location of Marnans
- Location within France Location within Auvergne-Rhône-Alpes
- Coordinates: 45°17′44″N 5°14′16″E
- Country: France
- Region: Auvergne-Rhône-Alpes
- Department: Isère
- Arrondissement: Vienne
- Canton: Bièvre
- Intercommunality: Bièvre Isère

Government
  - Mayor (2020–2026): Bernard Gillet
- Area^{1}: 6.6 km^{2} (2.5 sq mi)
- Highest elevation: 630 m (2,070 ft)
- Lowest elevation: 441 m (1,447 ft)
- Population (2023): 132
  - Density: 20/km^{2} (52/sq mi)
- Time zone: UTC+01:00 (CET)
  - Summer (DST): UTC+02:00 (CEST)
- INSEE/Postal code: 38221 /38980
- ^{1} French Land Register data, which excludes lakes, ponds, glaciers > 1 km^{2} (0.386 sq mi or 247 acres) and river estuaries.

Marnans (French pronunciation: [maʁnɑ̃]) is a commune in the Isère department in southeastern France.

== Population ==
Historical population
Year	Pop.	±% p.a.
1968	111	—
1975	116	+0.63%
1982	145	+3.24%
1990	128	−1.55%
1999	117	−0.99%
2007	136	+1.90%
2012	158	+3.04%
2017	147	−1.43%
2023	132	−1.78%
Source: INSEE

== See also ==
- Communes of the Isère department
