= Sardieu =

- Commune
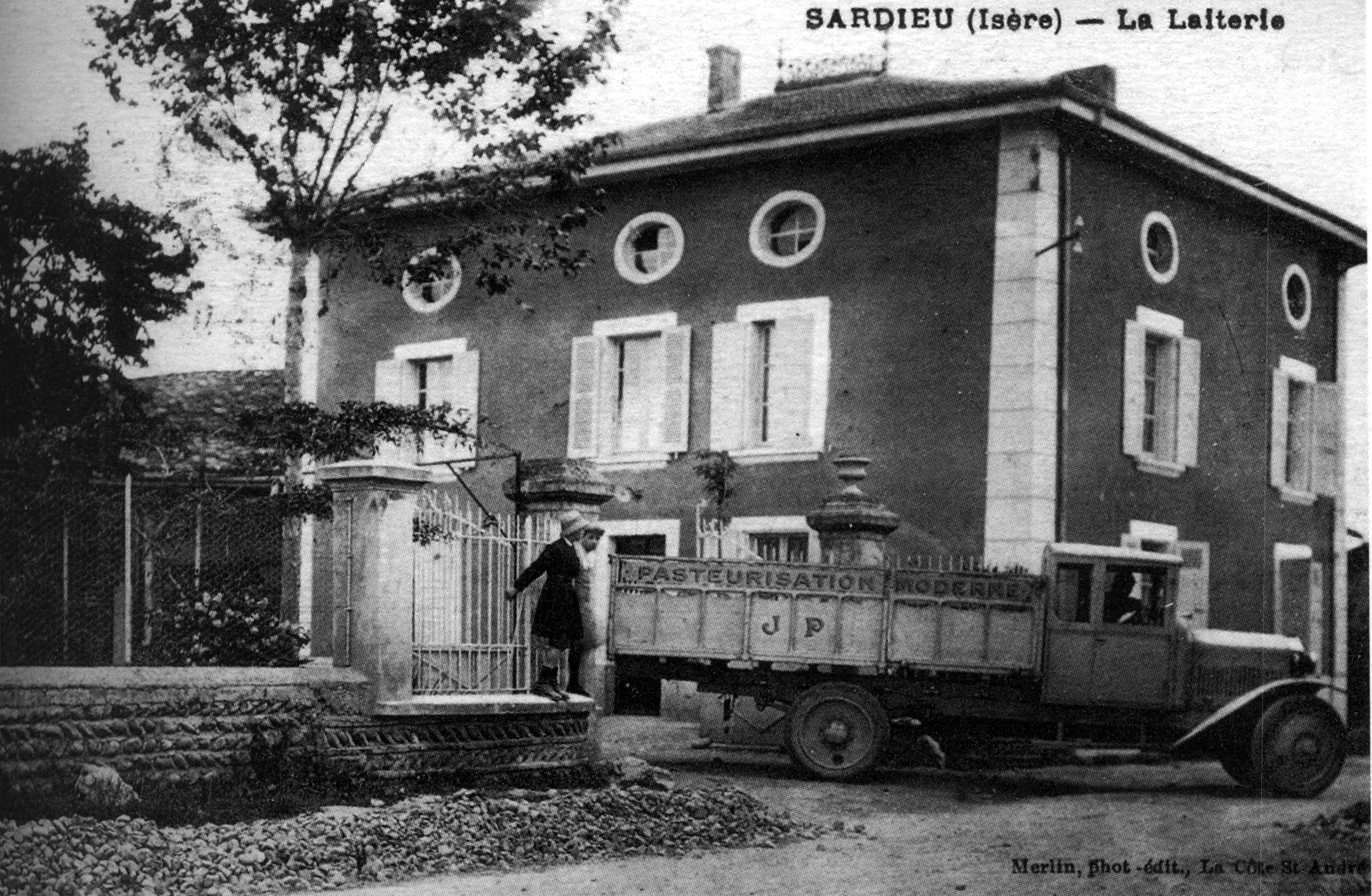
- Sardieu around 1930

- Coat of arms
- Location of Sardieu
- Location within France Location within Auvergne-Rhône-Alpes
- Coordinates: 45°22′12″N 5°12′45″E
- Country: France
- Region: Auvergne-Rhône-Alpes
- Department: Isère
- Arrondissement: Vienne
- Canton: Bièvre

Government
  - Mayor (2020–2026): Jean-Pierre Perroud
- Area^{1}: 11.2 km^{2} (4.3 sq mi)
- Elevation: 352 m (1,155 ft)
- Highest elevation: 358 m (1,175 ft)
- Lowest elevation: 322 m (1,056 ft)
- Population (2023): 1,193
  - Density: 107/km^{2} (276/sq mi)
- Time zone: UTC+01:00 (CET)
  - Summer (DST): UTC+02:00 (CEST)
- INSEE/Postal code: 38473 /38260
- ^{1} French Land Register data, which excludes lakes, ponds, glaciers > 1 km^{2} (0.386 sq mi or 247 acres) and river estuaries.

Sardieu (French pronunciation: [saʁdjø]) is a commune in the Isère department in southeastern France.

== Population ==
Historical population
Year	Pop.	±% p.a.
1968	453	—
1975	473	+0.62%
1982	522	+1.42%
1990	555	+0.77%
1999	600	+0.87%
2007	862	+4.63%
2012	1,050	+4.02%
2017	1,124	+1.37%
2023	1,193	+1.00%
Source: INSEE

== See also ==
- Communes of the Isère department
