= Mottier =

- Commune
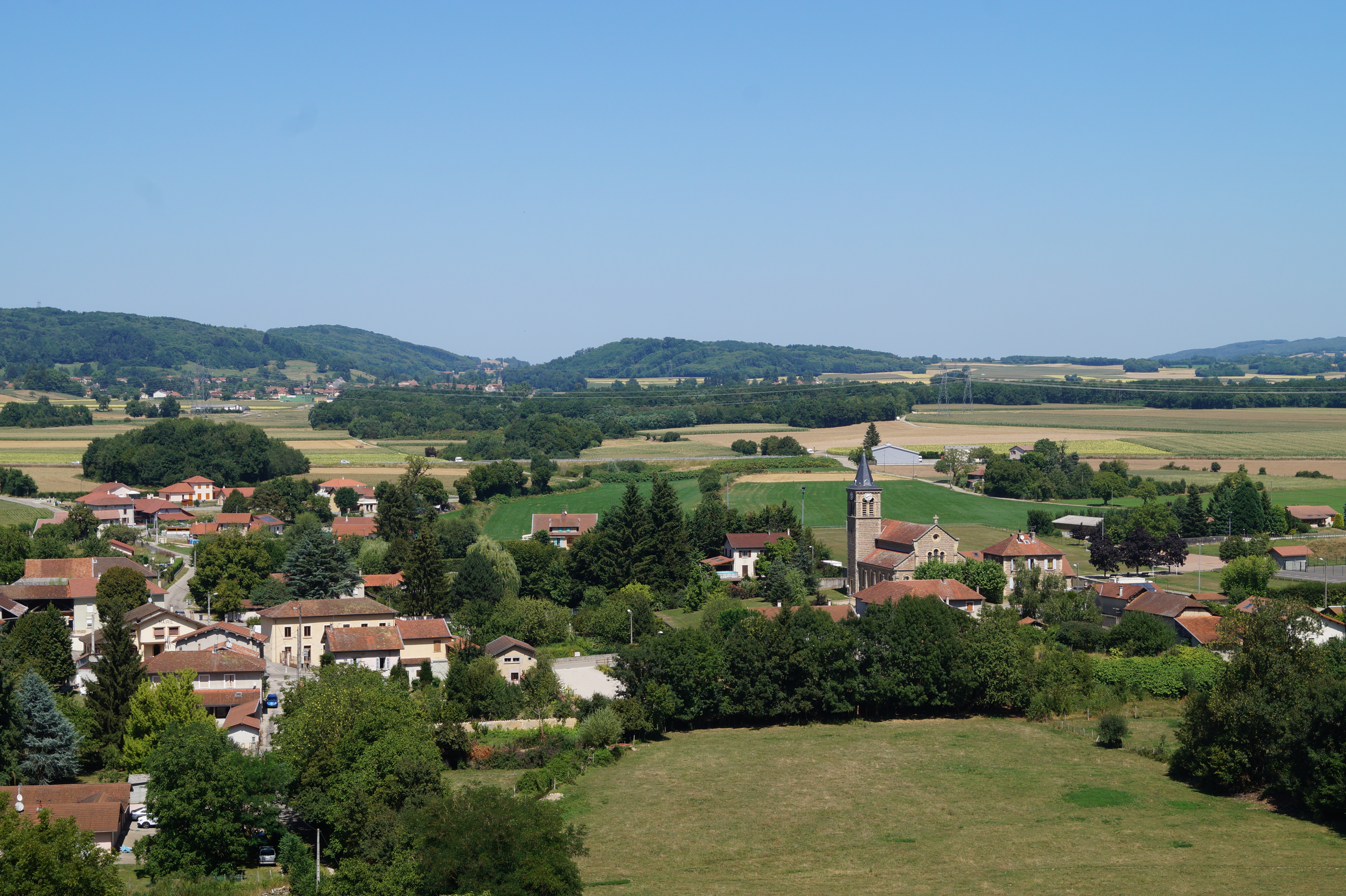
- An aerial view of Mottier
- Location of Mottier
- Location within France Location within Auvergne-Rhône-Alpes
- Coordinates: 45°25′11″N 5°19′04″E
- Country: France
- Region: Auvergne-Rhône-Alpes
- Department: Isère
- Arrondissement: Vienne
- Canton: Bièvre

Government
  - Mayor (2020–2026): Isabelle Rivard
- Area^{1}: 10.72 km^{2} (4.14 sq mi)
- Elevation: 480 m (1,570 ft)
- Highest elevation: 641 m (2,103 ft)
- Lowest elevation: 448 m (1,470 ft)
- Population (2023): 825
  - Density: 77.0/km^{2} (199/sq mi)
- Time zone: UTC+01:00 (CET)
  - Summer (DST): UTC+02:00 (CEST)
- INSEE/Postal code: 38267 /38260
- ^{1} French Land Register data, which excludes lakes, ponds, glaciers > 1 km^{2} (0.386 sq mi or 247 acres) and river estuaries.

Mottier (French pronunciation: [mɔtje]) is a French commune located in the Isère department in the Auvergne-Rhône-Alpes region. The village is overlooked by the ruins of an old fortified house dating from the 12th century.

== Demography ==
Historical population
Year	Pop.	±% p.a.
1968	362	—
1975	357	−0.20%
1982	414	+2.14%
1990	468	+1.54%
1999	511	+0.98%
2007	633	+2.71%
2012	690	+1.74%
2017	715	+0.71%
2023	825	+2.41%
Source: INSEE

The inhabitants of the commune are called the Mottiérots in French.

== See also ==
- Communes of the Isère department
