= Sillans =

- Commune
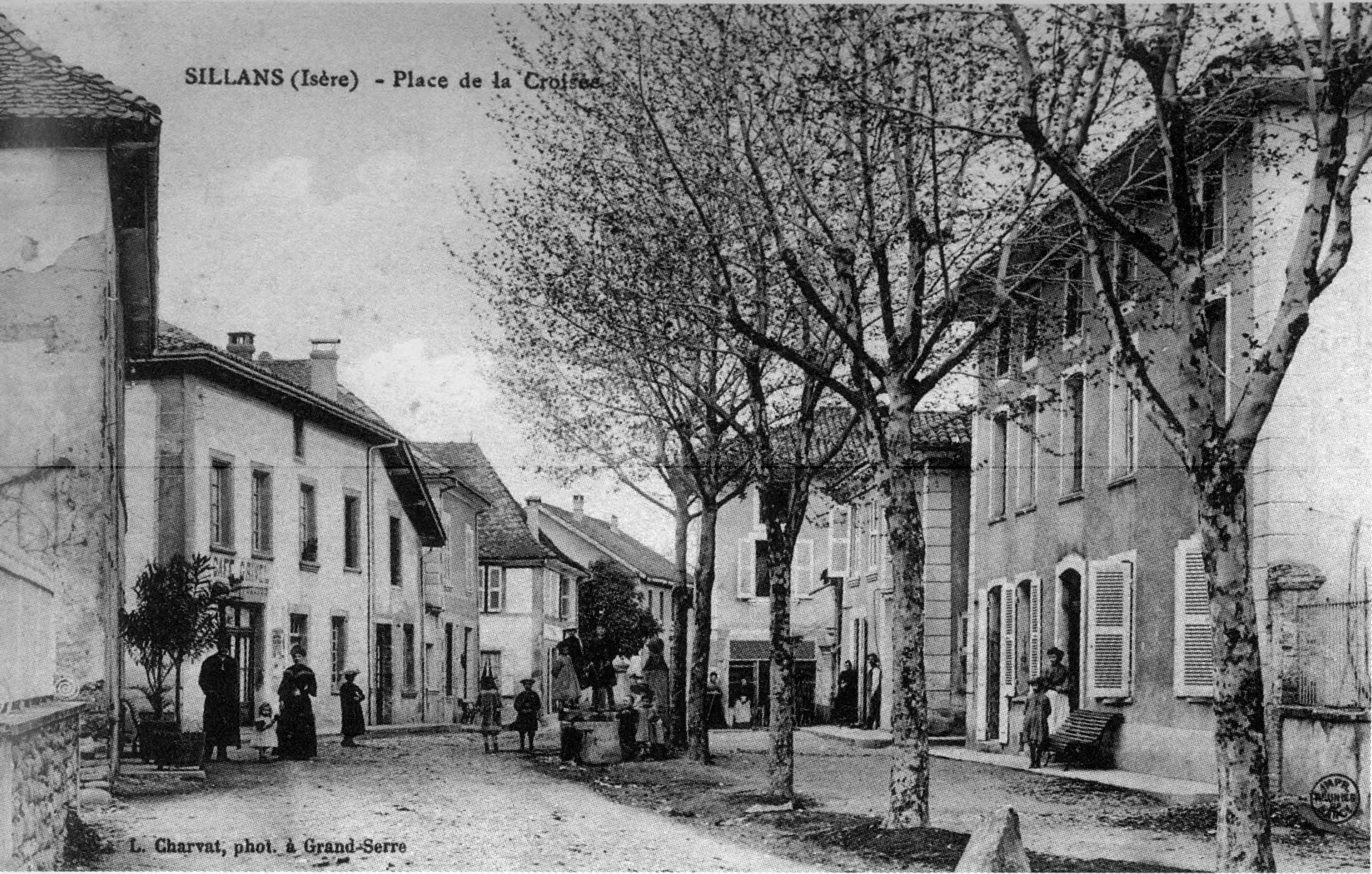
- Sillans in 1910
- Location of Sillans
- Location within France Location within Auvergne-Rhône-Alpes
- Coordinates: 45°20′30″N 5°23′23″E
- Country: France
- Region: Auvergne-Rhône-Alpes
- Department: Isère
- Arrondissement: Vienne
- Canton: Bièvre

Government
  - Mayor (2024–2026): Véronique Martin
- Area^{1}: 12.61 km^{2} (4.87 sq mi)
- Elevation: 403 m (1,322 ft)
- Highest elevation: 567 m (1,860 ft)
- Lowest elevation: 393 m (1,289 ft)
- Population (2023): 1,919
  - Density: 152.2/km^{2} (394.1/sq mi)
- Time zone: UTC+01:00 (CET)
  - Summer (DST): UTC+02:00 (CEST)
- INSEE/Postal code: 38490 /38590
- ^{1} French Land Register data, which excludes lakes, ponds, glaciers > 1 km^{2} (0.386 sq mi or 247 acres) and river estuaries.

Sillans (French pronunciation: [silɑ̃]) is a commune in the Isère department in southeastern France.

== Population ==
Historical population
Year	Pop.	±% p.a.
1968	965	—
1975	1,000	+0.51%
1982	1,086	+1.19%
1990	1,295	+2.22%
1999	1,405	+0.91%
2007	1,767	+2.91%
2012	1,877	+1.22%
2017	1,909	+0.34%
2023	1,919	+0.09%
Source: INSEE

== See also ==
- Communes of the Isère department
