= Châtenay, Isère =

Châtenay
- Commune
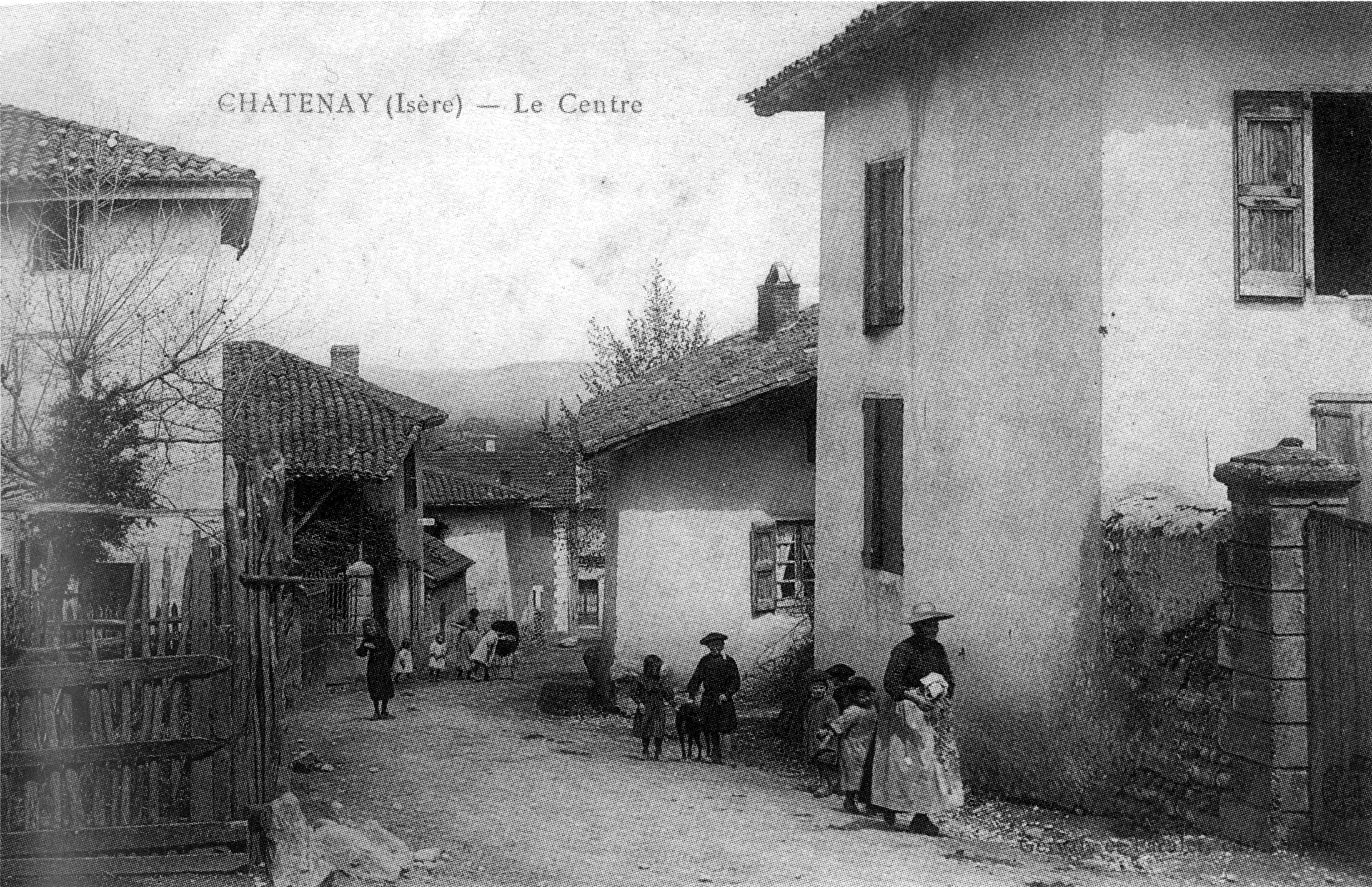
- The centre of Châtenay in 1920

- Coat of arms
- Location of Châtenay
- Location within France Location within Auvergne-Rhône-Alpes
- Coordinates: 45°19′18″N 5°13′48″E
- Country: France
- Region: Auvergne-Rhône-Alpes
- Department: Isère
- Arrondissement: Vienne
- Canton: Bièvre

Government
  - Mayor (2020–2026): Christian Chevallier
- Area^{1}: 4.62 km^{2} (1.78 sq mi)
- Elevation: 385 m (1,263 ft)
- Highest elevation: 548 m (1,798 ft)
- Lowest elevation: 324 m (1,063 ft)
- Population (2023): 433
  - Density: 93.7/km^{2} (243/sq mi)
- Time zone: UTC+01:00 (CET)
  - Summer (DST): UTC+02:00 (CEST)
- INSEE/Postal code: 38093 /38980
- ^{1} French Land Register data, which excludes lakes, ponds, glaciers > 1 km^{2} (0.386 sq mi or 247 acres) and river estuaries.

Châtenay (French pronunciation: [ʃatnɛ]) is a commune in the Isère department in southeastern France.

== Population ==
Historical population
Year	Pop.	±% p.a.
1968	266	—
1975	277	+0.58%
1982	301	+1.19%
1990	281	−0.86%
1999	303	+0.84%
2007	404	+3.66%
2012	437	+1.58%
2017	440	+0.14%
2023	433	−0.27%
Source: INSEE

== See also ==
- Communes of the Isère department
