= Saint-Siméon-de-Bressieux =

- Commune
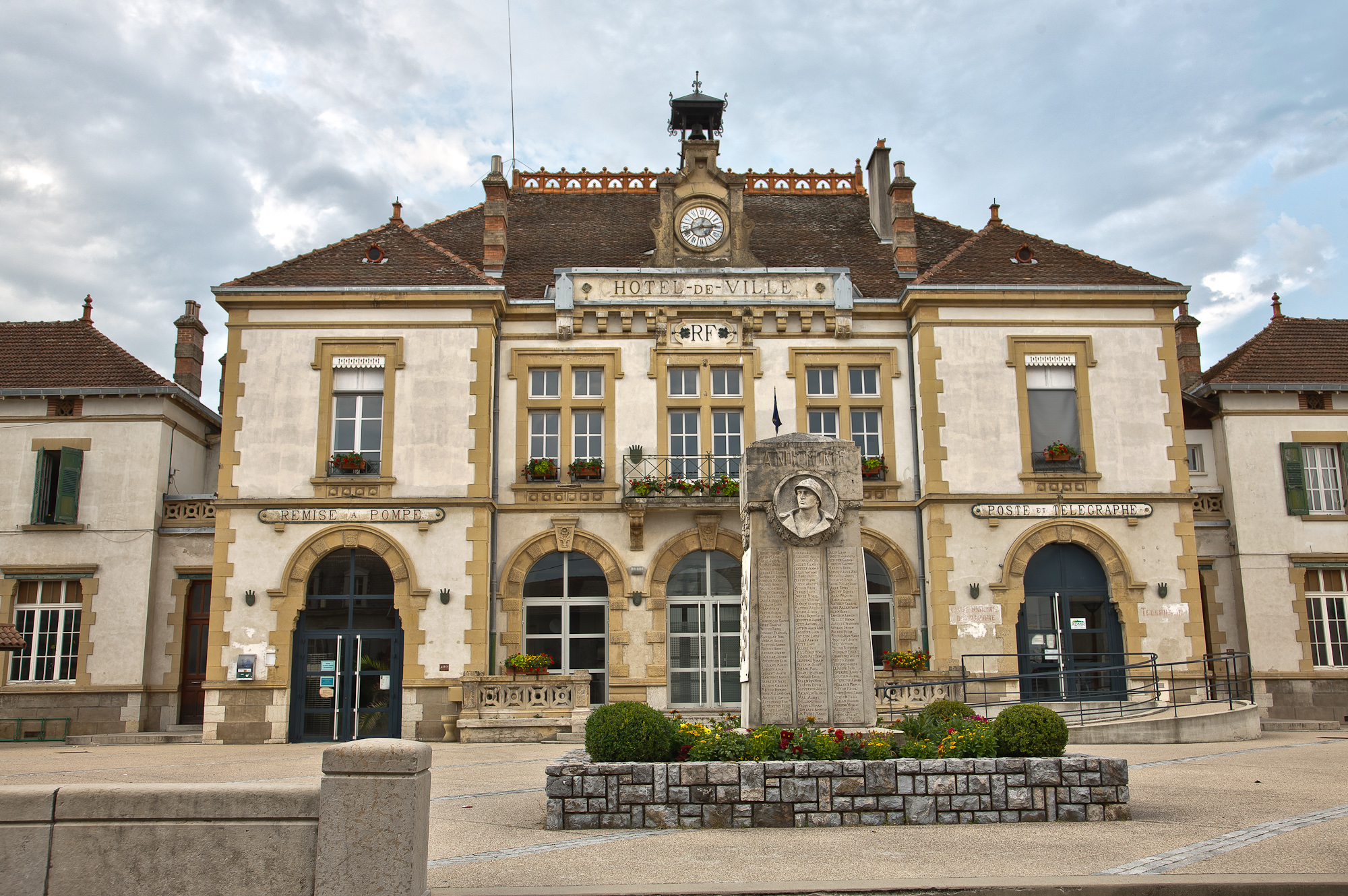
- Town hall
- Location of Saint-Siméon-de-Bressieux
- Location within France Location within Auvergne-Rhône-Alpes
- Coordinates: 45°19′45″N 5°15′44″E
- Country: France
- Region: Auvergne-Rhône-Alpes
- Department: Isère
- Arrondissement: Vienne
- Canton: Bièvre

Government
  - Mayor (2020–2026): Éric Savignon
- Area^{1}: 18.79 km^{2} (7.25 sq mi)
- Elevation: 378 m (1,240 ft)
- Highest elevation: 627 m (2,057 ft)
- Lowest elevation: 337 m (1,106 ft)
- Population (2023): 3,186
  - Density: 169.6/km^{2} (439.2/sq mi)
- Time zone: UTC+01:00 (CET)
  - Summer (DST): UTC+02:00 (CEST)
- INSEE/Postal code: 38457 /38870
- ^{1} French Land Register data, which excludes lakes, ponds, glaciers > 1 km^{2} (0.386 sq mi or 247 acres) and river estuaries.

Saint-Siméon-de-Bressieux (French pronunciation: [sɛ̃ simeɔ̃ də bʁɛsjø], literally Saint-Siméon of Bressieux) is a commune in the Isère department in southeastern France.

== Population ==
Historical population

Year	Pop.	±% p.a.
1800	1,452	—
1821	2,096	+1.76%
1846	2,221	+0.23%
1872	1,975	−0.45%
1901	2,349	+0.60%
1926	1,771	−1.12%
1946	1,638	−0.39%
1962	1,774	+0.50%
1968	1,861	+0.80%

Year	Pop.	±% p.a.
1975	2,527	+4.47%
1982	2,600	+0.41%
1990	2,437	−0.81%
1999	2,498	+0.28%
2007	2,739	+1.16%
2012	2,808	+0.50%
2017	2,887	+0.56%
2023	3,186	+1.66%

Source: EHESS and INSEE (1968-2023)

== See also ==
- Communes of the Isère department
