= Plan, Isère =

Plan
- Commune
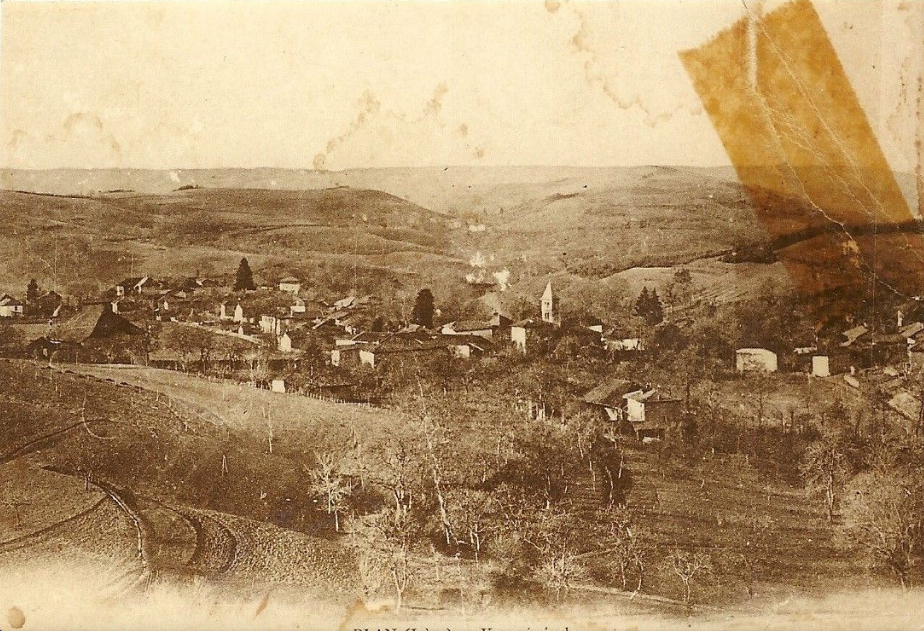
- Plan at the start of the 20th century
- Location of Plan
- Location within France Location within Auvergne-Rhône-Alpes
- Coordinates: 45°18′49″N 5°23′36″E
- Country: France
- Region: Auvergne-Rhône-Alpes
- Department: Isère
- Arrondissement: Vienne
- Canton: Bièvre

Government
  - Mayor (2020–2026): Patrick Cugniet
- Area^{1}: 6.1 km^{2} (2.4 sq mi)
- Elevation: 600 m (2,000 ft)
- Highest elevation: 785 m (2,575 ft)
- Lowest elevation: 452 m (1,483 ft)
- Population (2023): 300
  - Density: 49/km^{2} (130/sq mi)
- Time zone: UTC+01:00 (CET)
  - Summer (DST): UTC+02:00 (CEST)
- INSEE/Postal code: 38308 /38590
- ^{1} French Land Register data, which excludes lakes, ponds, glaciers > 1 km^{2} (0.386 sq mi or 247 acres) and river estuaries.

Plan (French pronunciation: [plɑ̃]) is a commune in the Isère department in southeastern France.

== Population ==
Historical population
Year	Pop.	±% p.a.
1968	125	—
1975	113	−1.43%
1982	147	+3.83%
1990	184	+2.85%
1999	182	−0.12%
2007	226	+2.74%
2012	252	+2.20%
2017	261	+0.70%
2023	300	+2.35%
Source: INSEE

== See also ==
- Communes of the Isère department
