= Marcollin =

- Commune
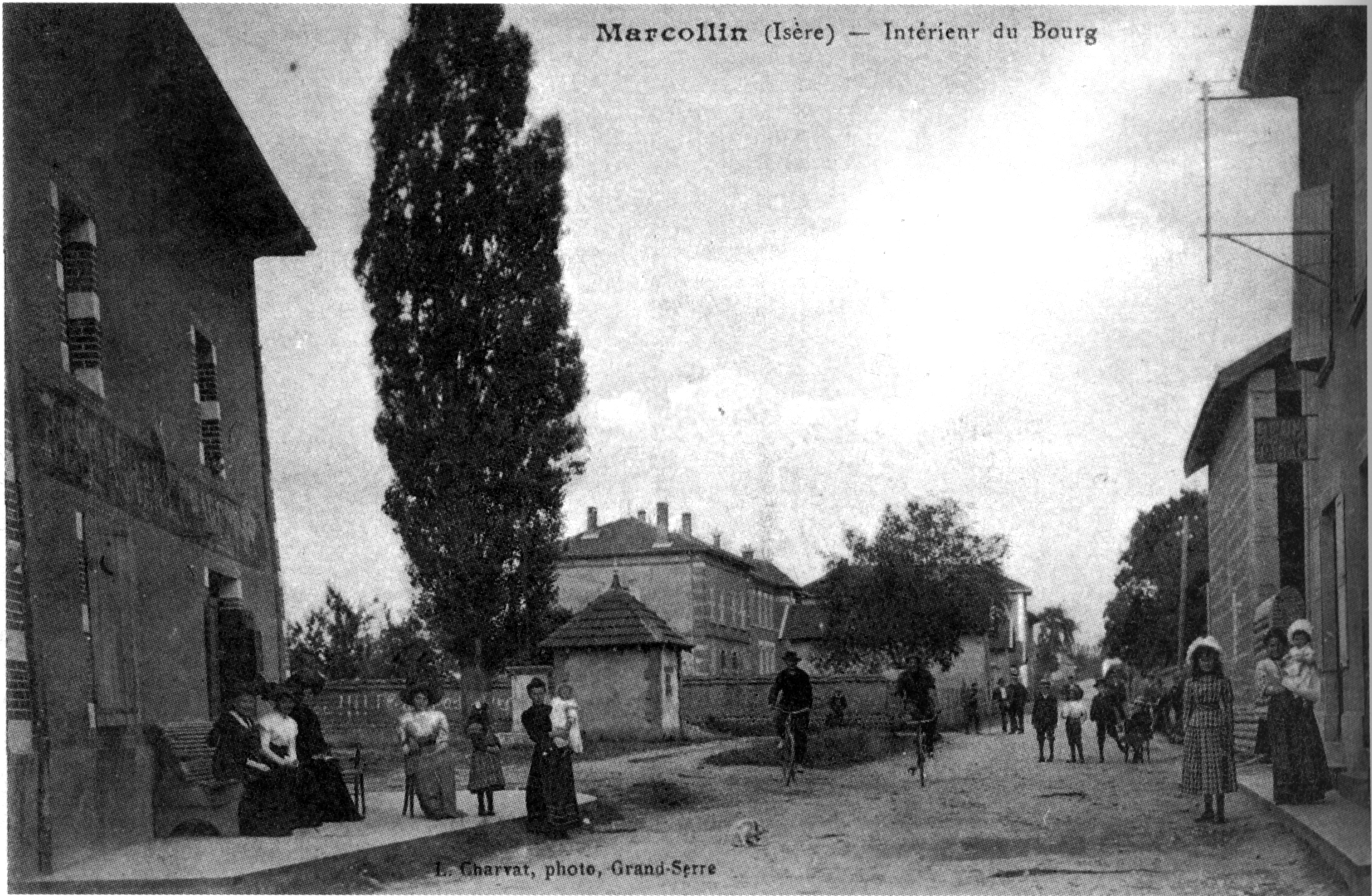
- Marcollin in 1910
- Location of Marcollin
- Location within France Location within Auvergne-Rhône-Alpes
- Coordinates: 45°18′23″N 5°05′19″E
- Country: France
- Region: Auvergne-Rhône-Alpes
- Department: Isère
- Arrondissement: Vienne
- Canton: Bièvre

Government
  - Mayor (2021–2026): Anaïs Scala
- Area^{1}: 10.69 km^{2} (4.13 sq mi)
- Highest elevation: 442 m (1,450 ft)
- Lowest elevation: 279 m (915 ft)
- Population (2023): 599
  - Density: 56.0/km^{2} (145/sq mi)
- Time zone: UTC+01:00 (CET)
  - Summer (DST): UTC+02:00 (CEST)
- INSEE/Postal code: 38219 /38270
- ^{1} French Land Register data, which excludes lakes, ponds, glaciers > 1 km^{2} (0.386 sq mi or 247 acres) and river estuaries.

Marcollin (French pronunciation: [maʁkɔlɛ̃]) is a commune in the Isère department in southeastern France.

== Population ==
Historical population
Year	Pop.	±% p.a.
1968	402	—
1975	404	+0.07%
1982	411	+0.25%
1990	476	+1.85%
1999	466	−0.24%
2007	605	+3.32%
2012	675	+2.21%
2017	670	−0.15%
2023	599	−1.85%
Source: INSEE

== See also ==
- Communes of the Isère department Isère
