= Saint-Paul-d'Izeaux =

- Commune
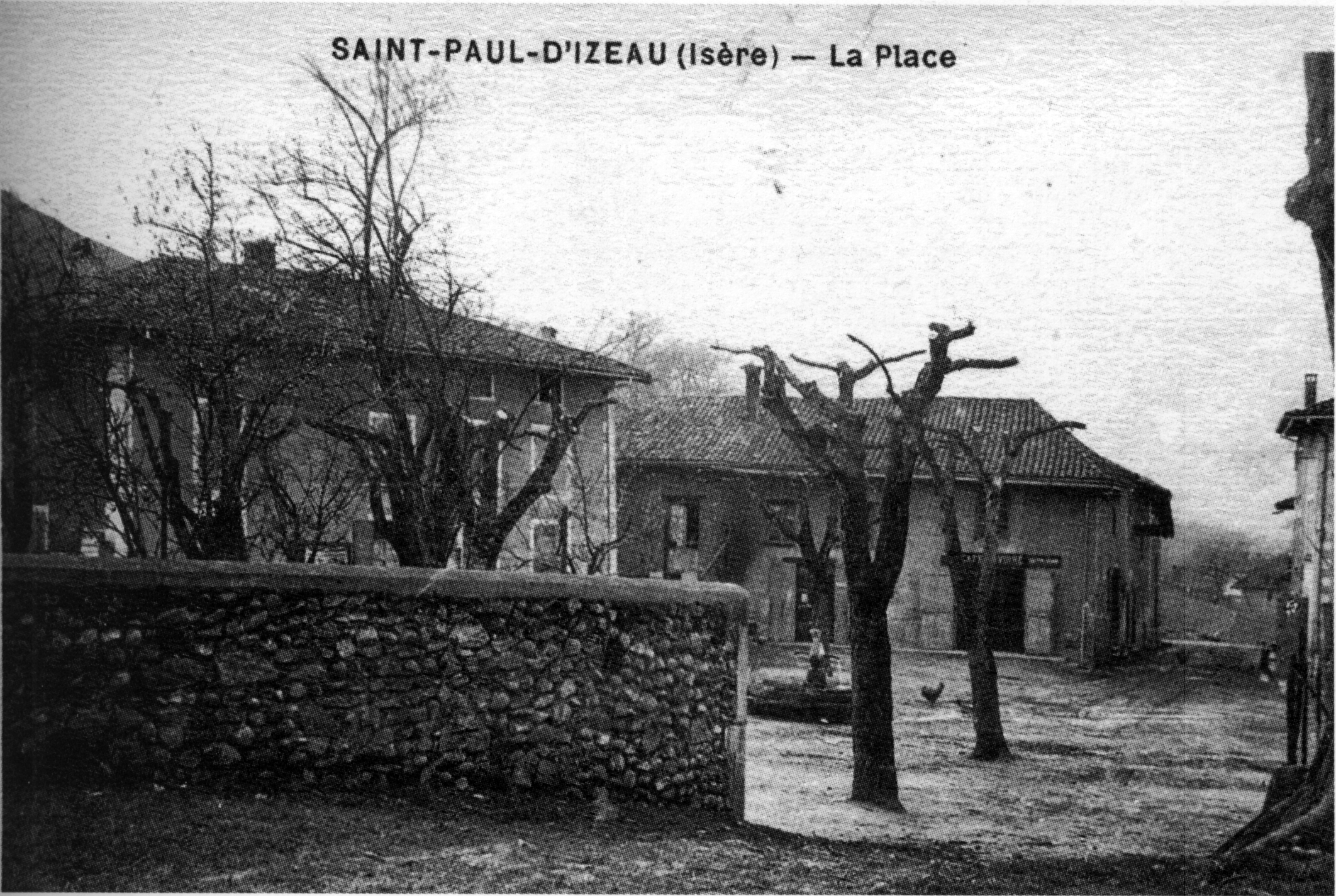
- Saint-Paul-d'Izeaux in 1910
- Location of Saint-Paul-d'Izeaux
- Location within France Location within Auvergne-Rhône-Alpes
- Coordinates: 45°19′03″N 5°25′49″E
- Country: France
- Region: Auvergne-Rhône-Alpes
- Department: Isère
- Arrondissement: Vienne
- Canton: Bièvre
- Intercommunality: Bièvre Isère

Government
  - Mayor (2020–2026): Patrick Chaumat
- Area^{1}: 7.63 km^{2} (2.95 sq mi)
- Elevation: 500 m (1,600 ft)
- Highest elevation: 764 m (2,507 ft)
- Lowest elevation: 458 m (1,503 ft)
- Population (2023): 307
  - Density: 40.2/km^{2} (104/sq mi)
- Time zone: UTC+01:00 (CET)
  - Summer (DST): UTC+02:00 (CEST)
- INSEE/Postal code: 38437 /38140
- ^{1} French Land Register data, which excludes lakes, ponds, glaciers > 1 km^{2} (0.386 sq mi or 247 acres) and river estuaries.

Saint-Paul-d'Izeaux (French pronunciation: [sɛ̃ pɔl dizo], literally Saint-Paul of Izeaux) is a commune in the Isère department in southeastern France.

== Population ==
Historical population
Year	Pop.	±% p.a.
1968	190	—
1975	156	−2.78%
1982	212	+4.48%
1990	248	+1.98%
1999	295	+1.95%
2007	320	+1.02%
2012	303	−1.09%
2017	295	−0.53%
2023	307	+0.67%
Source: INSEE

== See also ==
- Communes of the Isère department
