= Savas-Mépin =

- Commune
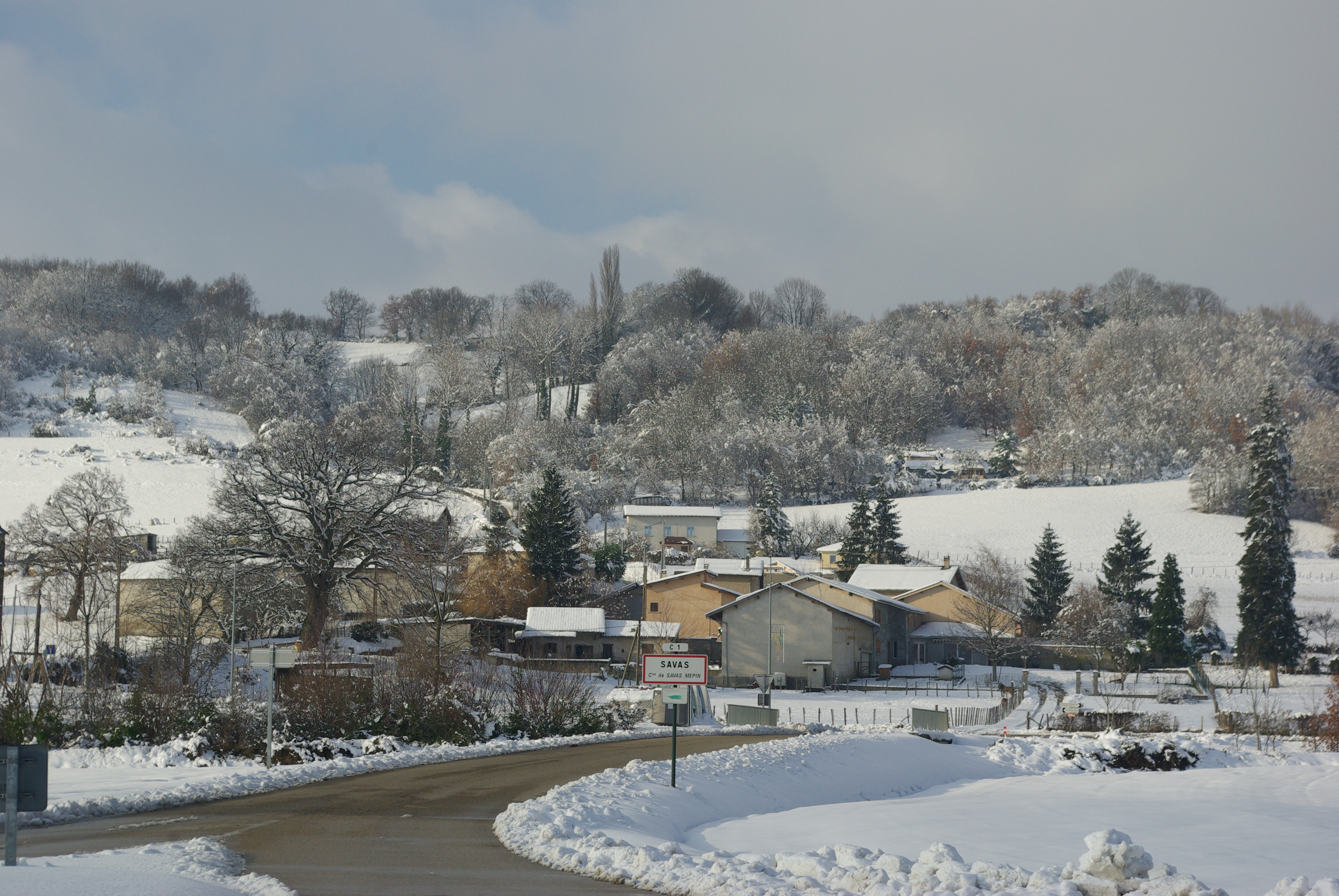
- A general view of Savas in the snow
- Location of Savas-Mépin
- Location within France Location within Auvergne-Rhône-Alpes
- Coordinates: 45°29′24″N 5°04′19″E
- Country: France
- Region: Auvergne-Rhône-Alpes
- Department: Isère
- Arrondissement: Vienne
- Canton: Bièvre

Government
  - Mayor (2020–2026): Bertrand Duranton
- Area^{1}: 10.43 km^{2} (4.03 sq mi)
- Elevation: 315 m (1,033 ft)
- Highest elevation: 472 m (1,549 ft)
- Lowest elevation: 288 m (945 ft)
- Population (2023): 883
  - Density: 84.7/km^{2} (219/sq mi)
- Time zone: UTC+01:00 (CET)
  - Summer (DST): UTC+02:00 (CEST)
- INSEE/Postal code: 38476 /38440
- ^{1} French Land Register data, which excludes lakes, ponds, glaciers > 1 km^{2} (0.386 sq mi or 247 acres) and river estuaries.

Savas-Mépin (French pronunciation: [sava mepɛ̃]) is a commune in the Isère department in southeastern France.

== Population ==
Historical population
| Year | Pop. | ±% p.a. |
|---|---|---|
| 1968 | 309 | — |
| 1975 | 319 | +0.46% |
| 1982 | 540 | +7.81% |
| 1990 | 576 | +0.81% |
| 1999 | 572 | −0.08% |
| 2007 | 793 | +4.17% |
| 2012 | 809 | +0.40% |
| 2017 | 895 | +2.04% |
| 2023 | 883 | −0.22% |
Source: INSEE

== See also ==
- Communes of the Isère department
