= Beauvoir-de-Marc =

- Commune
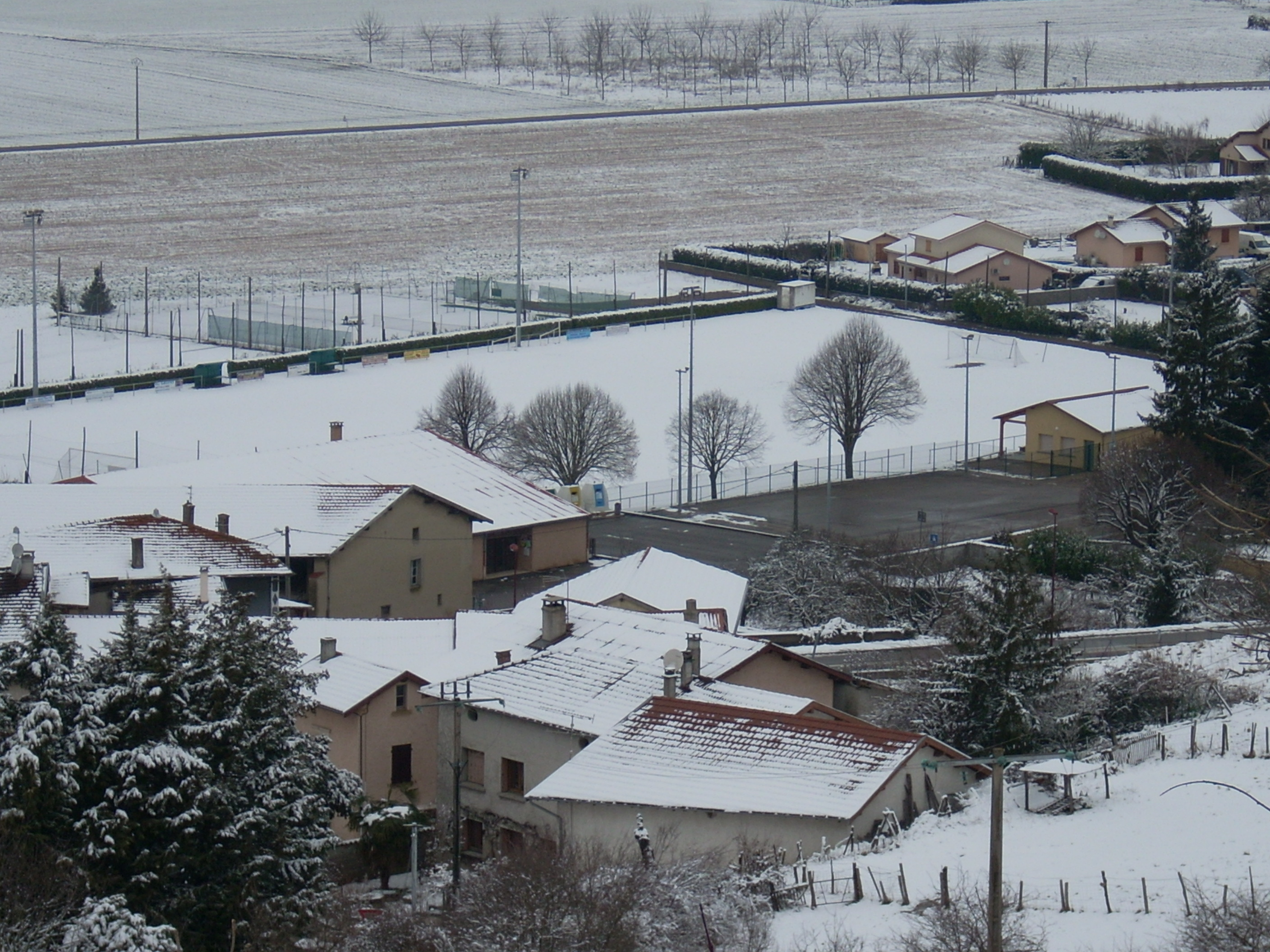
- Beauvoir-de-Marc in the snow

- Coat of arms
- Location of Beauvoir-de-Marc
- Location within France Location within Auvergne-Rhône-Alpes
- Coordinates: 45°31′10″N 5°04′48″E
- Country: France
- Region: Auvergne-Rhône-Alpes
- Department: Isère
- Arrondissement: Vienne
- Canton: Bièvre

Government
  - Mayor (2020–2026): Robert Mandrand
- Area^{1}: 11.27 km^{2} (4.35 sq mi)
- Highest elevation: 456 m (1,496 ft)
- Lowest elevation: 306 m (1,004 ft)
- Population (2023): 1,098
  - Density: 97.43/km^{2} (252.3/sq mi)
- Time zone: UTC+01:00 (CET)
  - Summer (DST): UTC+02:00 (CEST)
- INSEE/Postal code: 38035 /38440
- ^{1} French Land Register data, which excludes lakes, ponds, glaciers > 1 km^{2} (0.386 sq mi or 247 acres) and river estuaries.

Beauvoir-de-Marc (French pronunciation: [bovwaʁ də maʁk]) is a commune in the northern part of the Isère department. Isère is found in southeastern France, in the Auvergne-Rhône-Alpes region.

Its area is 11.27 km^{2}. Beauvoir-de-Marc is at an altitude of between 306 and 456 meters above sea level.

== Geography ==
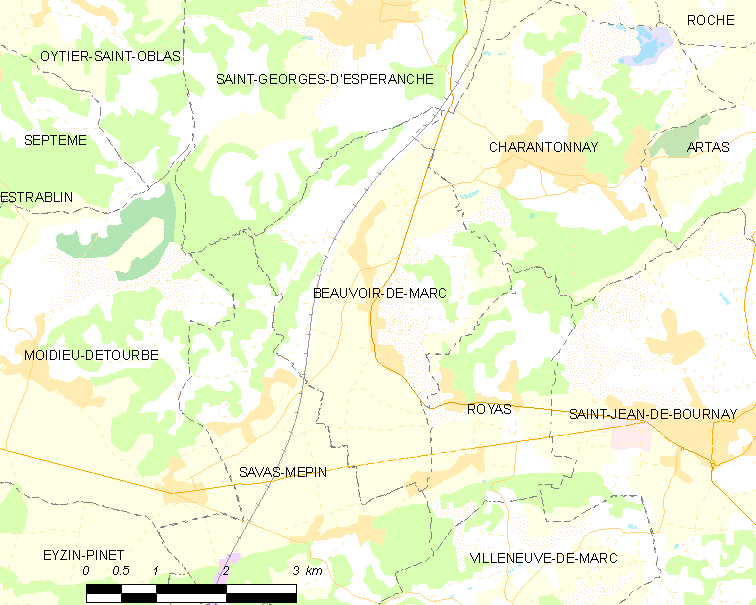
Map of Beauvoir-de-Marc and neighboring communes

=== Location and description ===
Beauvoir-de-Marc is located in the northern part of the Isère department on the Bourgoin-Jallieu axis - Vienne, at an equal distance of 20 km between each of these two Dauphiné urban areas.

Saint-Jean-de-Bournay is the closest city at 10 km away, in the shadow of the Lyonnais metropolis approximately 50 km away.

In the 21st century, urbanization brought on by demographic pressure and the suburbanization of Lyon spread diffusely throughout the valley, leading to urban sprawl. At the outset, the frame was constructed with local material: beaten or rammed earth.

=== Geology ===
Located in the western region of the Terres froides, covered by glacial formations, the subsoil of Beauvoir-de-Marc is primarily composed of emergent molasses growing on slope sides. The land, covered in hummocks and punctuated by Gervonde valley, contains a small brook running through its foothills.

Various distinguishing features of the moraine glaciers are apparent. The humid prairies contain typical species of these parts: salamanders and crawfish. Certain spots are a reflection of their name; for instance, " the Serfs". This feature posed many technical problems during the 1990/1992 construction of the high-speed line which cut through the village.

The vines that covered our hills have disappeared bit by bit. Land destined for polyculture, the pastures remain. Beauvoir-de-Marc is a land of soft, rolling hills accompanied by wooded countryside, unaffected by deforestation, unlike the steep slopes of the Combes.

== Population ==
Its inhabitants are called Beauvoisards in French.

Historical population
Year	Pop.	±% p.a.
1968	448	—
1975	469	+0.66%
1982	706	+6.02%
1990	803	+1.62%
1999	954	+1.93%
2007	1,016	+0.79%
2012	1,068	+1.00%
2017	1,121	+0.97%
2023	1,098	−0.34%
Source: INSEE

== See also ==
- Communes of the Isère department
