= Pajay =

- Commune
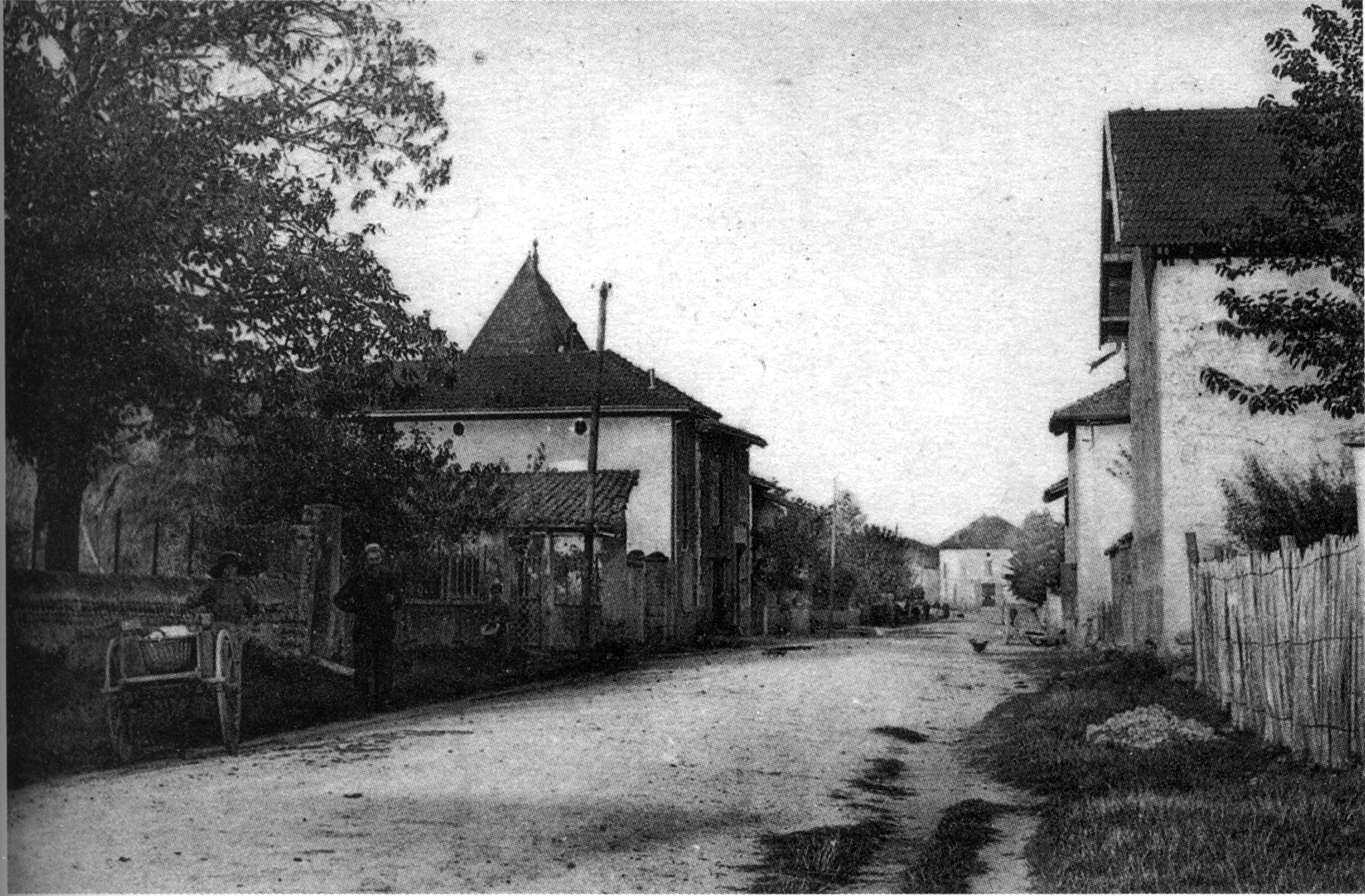
- Pajay in 1920
- Location of Pajay
- Location within France Location within Auvergne-Rhône-Alpes
- Coordinates: 45°21′53″N 5°08′24″E
- Country: France
- Region: Auvergne-Rhône-Alpes
- Department: Isère
- Arrondissement: Vienne
- Canton: Bièvre

Government
  - Mayor (2020–2026): Bernard Bajat
- Area^{1}: 14.32 km^{2} (5.53 sq mi)
- Highest elevation: 410 m (1,350 ft)
- Lowest elevation: 270 m (890 ft)
- Population (2023): 1,036
  - Density: 72.35/km^{2} (187.4/sq mi)
- Time zone: UTC+01:00 (CET)
  - Summer (DST): UTC+02:00 (CEST)
- INSEE/Postal code: 38291 /38260
- ^{1} French Land Register data, which excludes lakes, ponds, glaciers > 1 km^{2} (0.386 sq mi or 247 acres) and river estuaries.

Pajay (French pronunciation: [paʒɛ]) is a commune in the Isère department in southeastern France. It is about 50 km southeast of Lyon.

== Population ==
Historical population
Year	Pop.	±% p.a.
1968	583	—
1975	706	+2.77%
1982	798	+1.77%
1990	736	−1.01%
1999	796	+0.87%
2007	949	+2.22%
2012	1,092	+2.85%
2017	1,146	+0.97%
2023	1,036	−1.67%
Source: INSEE

== See also ==
- Communes of the Isère department
