= Lentiol =

- Commune
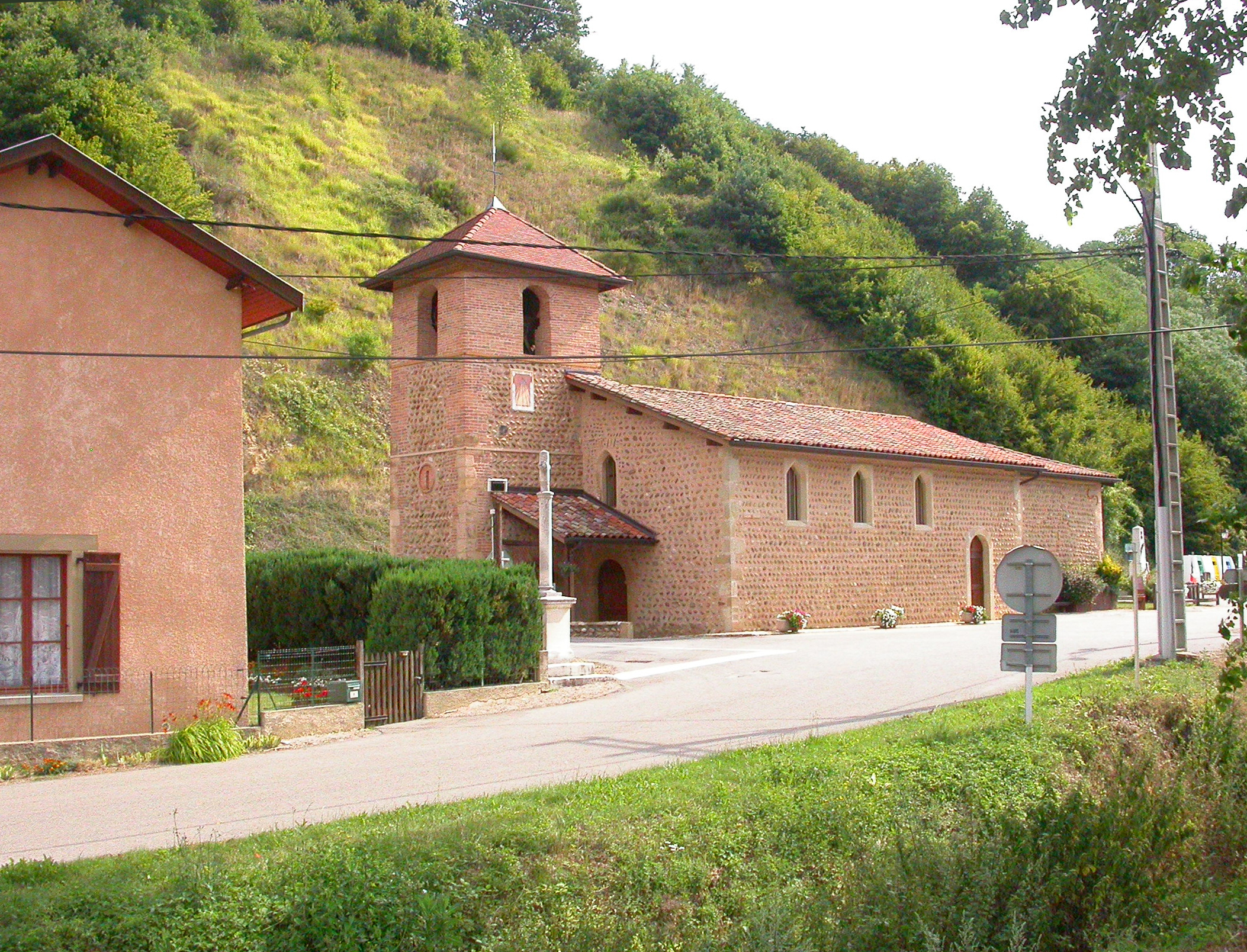
- The church of Lentiol
- Location of Lentiol
- Location within France Location within Auvergne-Rhône-Alpes
- Coordinates: 45°18′00″N 5°06′51″E
- Country: France
- Region: Auvergne-Rhône-Alpes
- Department: Isère
- Arrondissement: Vienne
- Canton: Bièvre

Government
  - Mayor (2020–2026): Henri Cottinet
- Area^{1}: 7.6 km^{2} (2.9 sq mi)
- Highest elevation: 479 m (1,572 ft)
- Lowest elevation: 337 m (1,106 ft)
- Population (2023): 242
  - Density: 32/km^{2} (82/sq mi)
- Time zone: UTC+01:00 (CET)
  - Summer (DST): UTC+02:00 (CEST)
- INSEE/Postal code: 38209 /38270
- ^{1} French Land Register data, which excludes lakes, ponds, glaciers > 1 km^{2} (0.386 sq mi or 247 acres) and river estuaries.

Lentiol (French pronunciation: [lɑ̃tjɔl]) is a commune in the Isère department in southeastern France.

== Population ==
Historical population
Year	Pop.	±% p.a.
1968	114	—
1975	101	−1.71%
1982	151	+5.91%
1990	131	−1.76%
1999	147	+1.29%
2007	202	+4.05%
2012	218	+1.54%
2017	222	+0.36%
2023	242	+1.45%
Source: INSEE

== See also ==
- Communes of the Isère department
