= Châtonnay =

- Commune
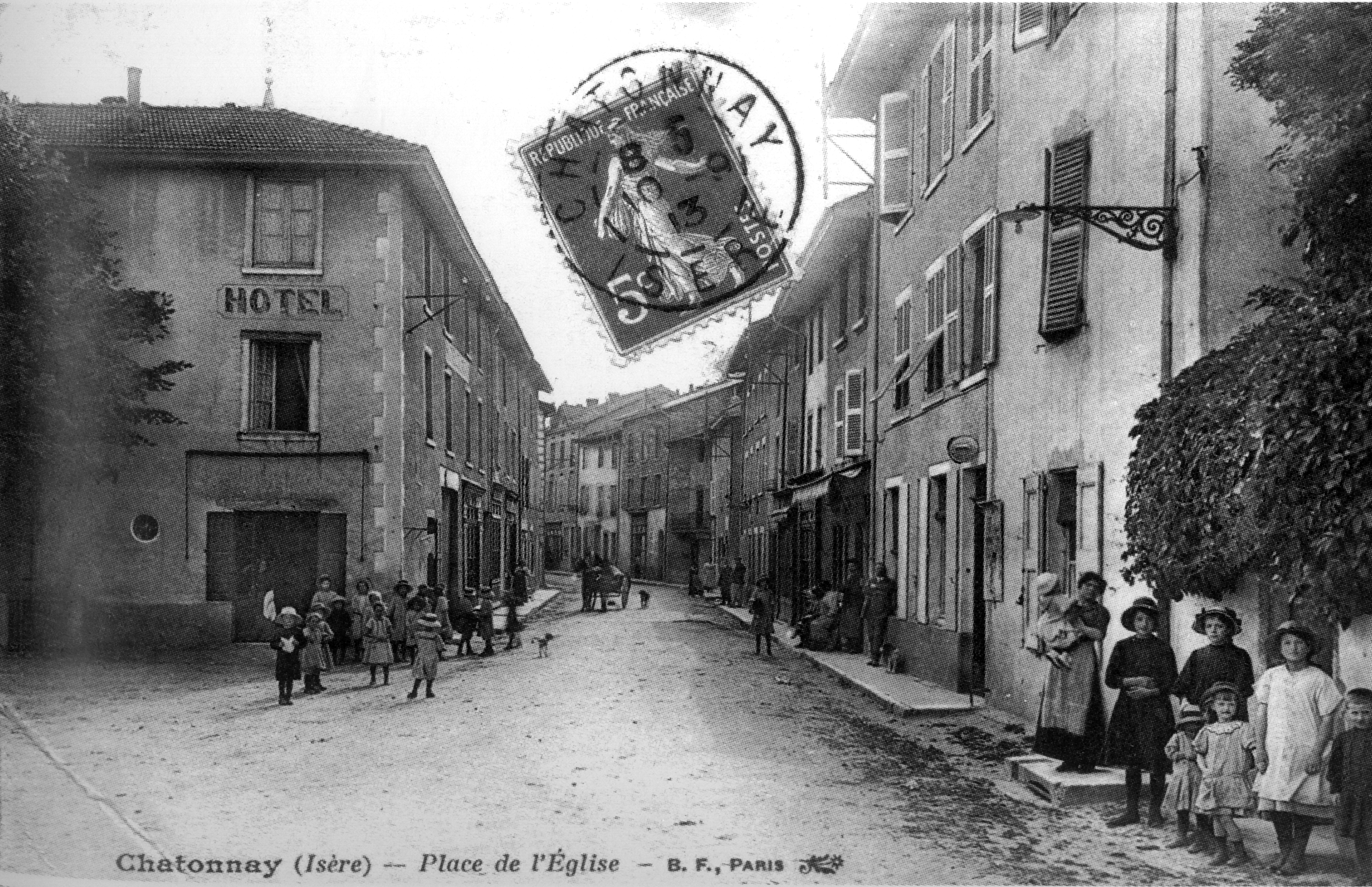
- The church square in 1913
- Location of Châtonnay
- Location within France Location within Auvergne-Rhône-Alpes
- Coordinates: 45°29′12″N 5°12′28″E
- Country: France
- Region: Auvergne-Rhône-Alpes
- Department: Isère
- Arrondissement: Vienne
- Canton: Bièvre

Government
  - Mayor (2020–2026): Jean-Michel Nogueras
- Area^{1}: 31.84 km^{2} (12.29 sq mi)
- Elevation: 452 m (1,483 ft)
- Highest elevation: 615 m (2,018 ft)
- Lowest elevation: 424 m (1,391 ft)
- Population (2023): 2,009
  - Density: 63.10/km^{2} (163.4/sq mi)
- Time zone: UTC+01:00 (CET)
  - Summer (DST): UTC+02:00 (CEST)
- INSEE/Postal code: 38094 /38440
- ^{1} French Land Register data, which excludes lakes, ponds, glaciers > 1 km^{2} (0.386 sq mi or 247 acres) and river estuaries.

Châtonnay (French pronunciation: [ʃatɔnɛ]) is a commune in the Isère department in southeastern France.

== Population ==
Historical population

| Year | Pop. | ±% p.a. |
|---|---|---|
| 1793 | 2,128 | — |
| 1800 | 2,505 | +2.36% |
| 1806 | 2,608 | +0.67% |
| 1821 | 2,981 | +0.90% |
| 1831 | 3,011 | +0.10% |
| 1836 | 3,034 | +0.15% |
| 1841 | 3,056 | +0.14% |
| 1846 | 3,203 | +0.94% |
| 1851 | 3,068 | −0.86% |
| 1856 | 2,713 | −2.43% |
| 1861 | 2,728 | +0.11% |
| 1866 | 2,168 | −4.49% |
| 1872 | 2,122 | −0.36% |
| 1876 | 2,122 | +0.00% |
| 1881 | 1,977 | −1.41% |
| 1886 | 1,938 | −0.40% |
| 1891 | 1,875 | −0.66% |
| 1896 | 1,826 | −0.53% |
| 1901 | 1,818 | −0.09% |

| Year | Pop. | ±% p.a. |
|---|---|---|
| 1906 | 1,617 | −2.32% |
| 1911 | 1,580 | −0.46% |
| 1921 | 1,453 | −0.83% |
| 1926 | 1,457 | +0.05% |
| 1931 | 1,450 | −0.10% |
| 1936 | 1,381 | −0.97% |
| 1946 | 1,304 | −0.57% |
| 1954 | 1,189 | −1.15% |
| 1962 | 1,151 | −0.41% |
| 1968 | 1,056 | −1.43% |
| 1975 | 1,096 | +0.53% |
| 1982 | 1,220 | +1.54% |
| 1990 | 1,341 | +1.19% |
| 1999 | 1,424 | +0.67% |
| 2007 | 1,749 | +2.60% |
| 2012 | 1,961 | +2.31% |
| 2017 | 2,072 | +1.11% |
| 2023 | 2,009 | −0.51% |

Source: EHESS and INSEE (1968-2023)

== See also ==
- Communes of the Isère department
