= Penol =

- Commune
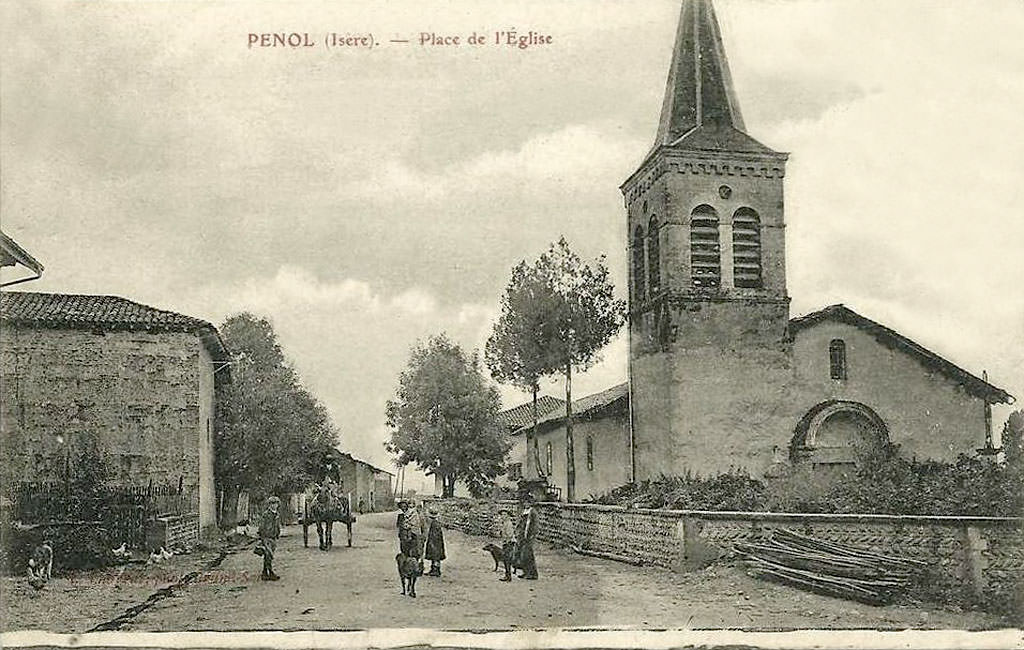
- Penol in the early 20th century
- Location of Penol
- Location within France Location within Auvergne-Rhône-Alpes
- Coordinates: 45°23′28″N 5°11′30″E
- Country: France
- Region: Auvergne-Rhône-Alpes
- Department: Isère
- Arrondissement: Vienne
- Canton: Bièvre

Government
  - Mayor (2020–2026): Bernard Veyret
- Area^{1}: 12.16 km^{2} (4.70 sq mi)
- Highest elevation: 455 m (1,493 ft)
- Lowest elevation: 281 m (922 ft)
- Population (2023): 381
  - Density: 31.3/km^{2} (81.2/sq mi)
- Time zone: UTC+01:00 (CET)
  - Summer (DST): UTC+02:00 (CEST)
- INSEE/Postal code: 38300 /38260
- ^{1} French Land Register data, which excludes lakes, ponds, glaciers > 1 km^{2} (0.386 sq mi or 247 acres) and river estuaries.

Penol (French pronunciation: [pənɔl]) is a commune in the Isère department in southeastern France.

== Population ==
Historical population
Year	Pop.	±% p.a.
1968	231	—
1975	242	+0.67%
1982	247	+0.29%
1990	278	+1.49%
1999	288	+0.39%
2007	307	+0.80%
2012	326	+1.21%
2017	350	+1.43%
2023	381	+1.42%
Source: INSEE

== See also ==
- Communes of the Isère department
