= Viriville =

- Commune
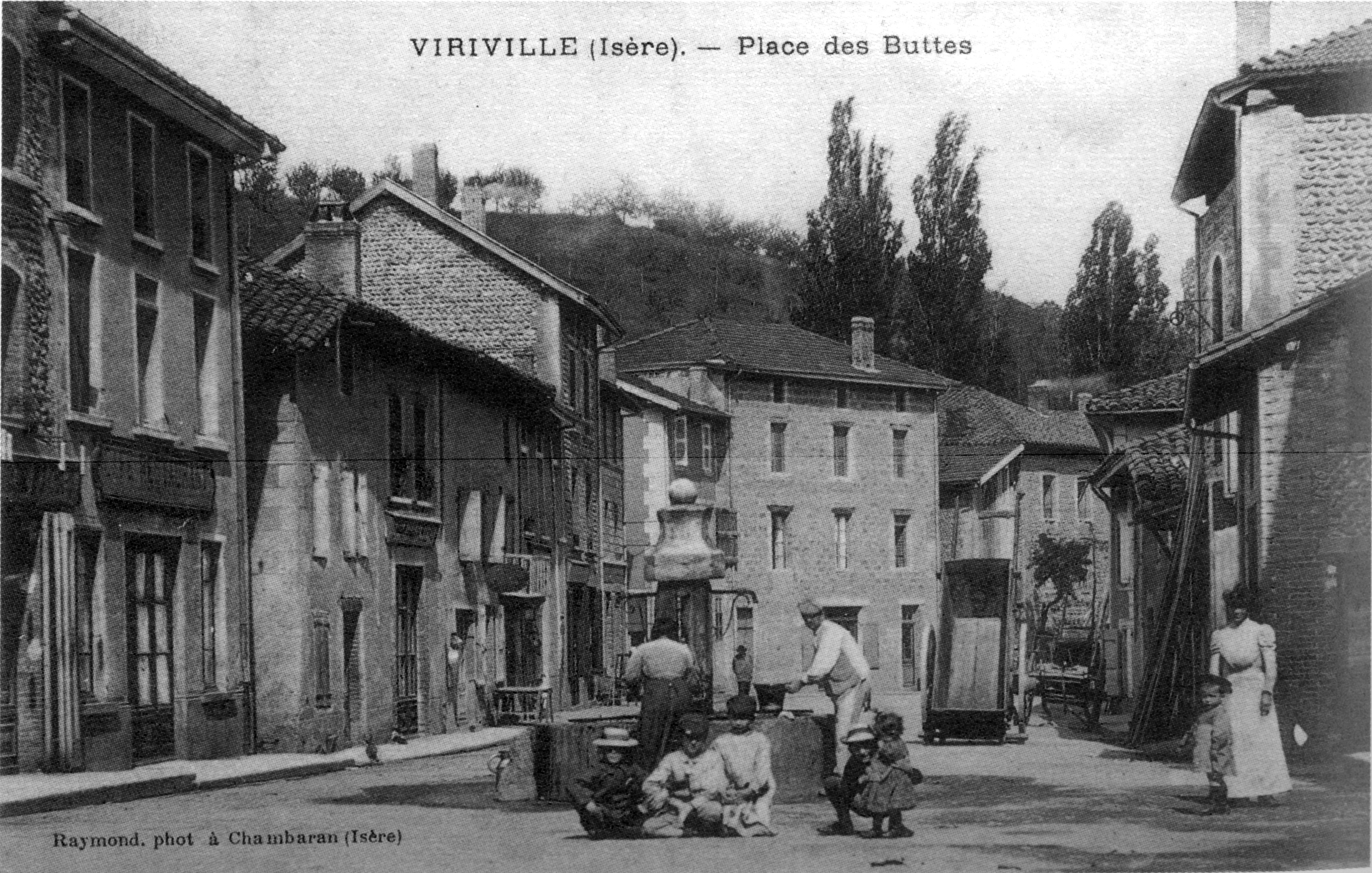
- Viriville in 1912

- Coat of arms
- Location of Viriville
- Location within France Location within Auvergne-Rhône-Alpes
- Coordinates: 45°19′00″N 5°12′18″E
- Country: France
- Region: Auvergne-Rhône-Alpes
- Department: Isère
- Arrondissement: Vienne
- Canton: Bièvre

Government
  - Mayor (2020–2026): Françoise Sempé-Buffet
- Area^{1}: 30.46 km^{2} (11.76 sq mi)
- Elevation: 360 m (1,180 ft)
- Highest elevation: 606 m (1,988 ft)
- Lowest elevation: 306 m (1,004 ft)
- Population (2023): 1,713
  - Density: 56.24/km^{2} (145.7/sq mi)
- Time zone: UTC+01:00 (CET)
  - Summer (DST): UTC+02:00 (CEST)
- INSEE/Postal code: 38561 /38980
- ^{1} French Land Register data, which excludes lakes, ponds, glaciers > 1 km^{2} (0.386 sq mi or 247 acres) and river estuaries.

Viriville (French pronunciation: [viʁivil]) is a commune in the Isère department in southeastern France.

== Population ==
Historical population
Year	Pop.	±% p.a.
1968	1,101	—
1975	1,141	+0.51%
1982	1,137	−0.05%
1990	1,194	+0.61%
1999	1,176	−0.17%
2007	1,289	+1.15%
2012	1,635	+4.87%
2017	1,630	−0.06%
2023	1,713	+0.83%
Source: INSEE

== See also ==
- Communes of the Isère department
