= Marcilloles =

- Commune
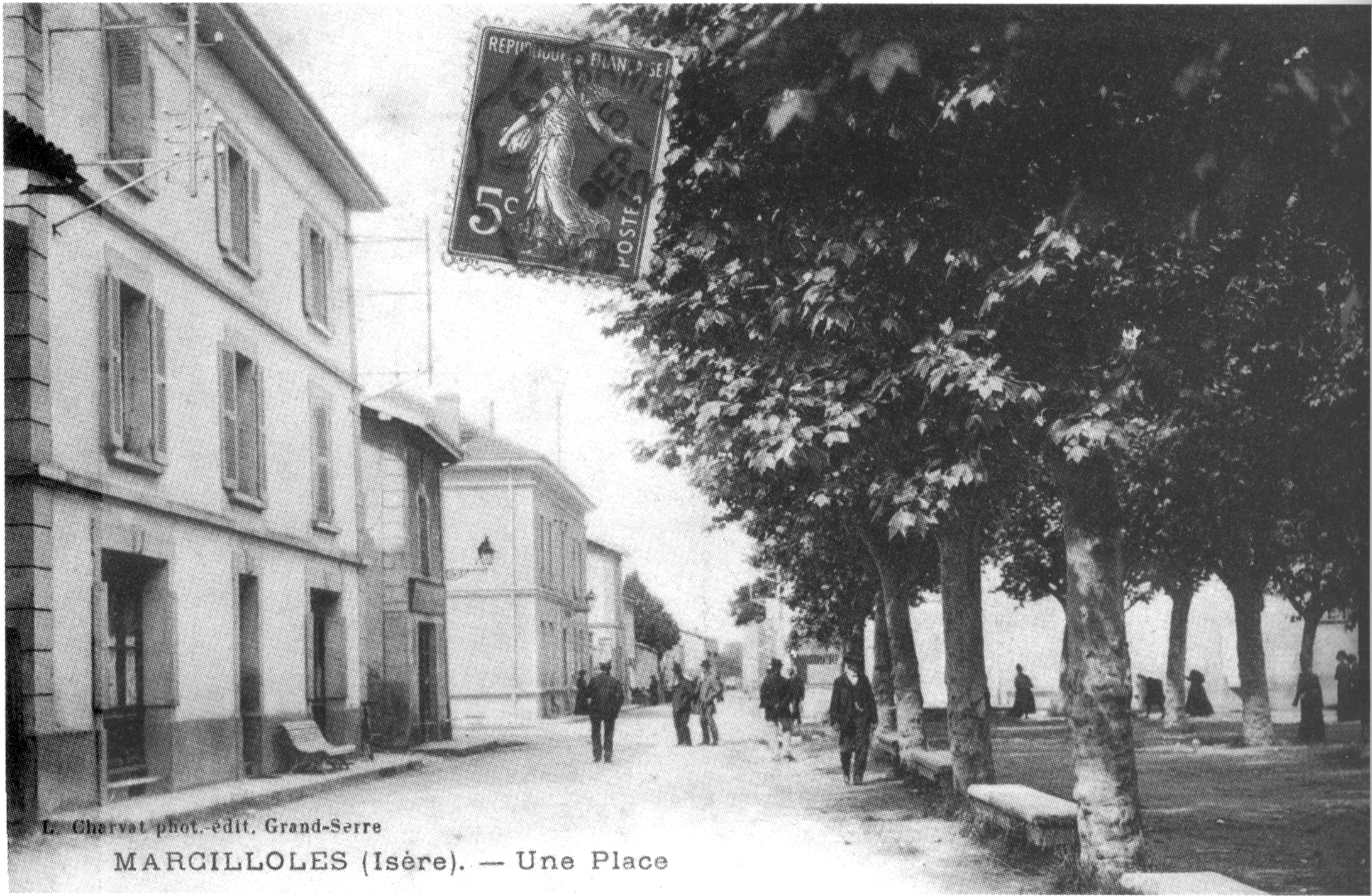
- Marcilolles in 1911
- Location of Marcilloles
- Location within France Location within Auvergne-Rhône-Alpes
- Coordinates: 45°20′28″N 5°11′04″E
- Country: France
- Region: Auvergne-Rhône-Alpes
- Department: Isère
- Arrondissement: Vienne
- Canton: Bièvre
- Intercommunality: Bièvre Isère

Government
  - Mayor (2020–2026): Dominique Primat
- Area^{1}: 9.5 km^{2} (3.7 sq mi)
- Elevation: 311 m (1,020 ft)
- Highest elevation: 351 m (1,152 ft)
- Lowest elevation: 288 m (945 ft)
- Population (2023): 1,201
  - Density: 130/km^{2} (330/sq mi)
- Time zone: UTC+01:00 (CET)
  - Summer (DST): UTC+02:00 (CEST)
- INSEE/Postal code: 38218 /38260
- ^{1} French Land Register data, which excludes lakes, ponds, glaciers > 1 km^{2} (0.386 sq mi or 247 acres) and river estuaries.

Marcilloles (French pronunciation: [maʁsijɔl]) is a commune in the Isère department in southeastern France.

== Population ==
Historical population
Year	Pop.	±% p.a.
1968	644	—
1975	629	−0.34%
1982	647	+0.40%
1990	719	+1.33%
1999	758	+0.59%
2007	911	+2.32%
2012	1,028	+2.45%
2017	1,104	+1.44%
2023	1,201	+1.41%
Source: INSEE

== See also ==
- Communes of the Isère department
