= Saint-Geoirs =

- Commune
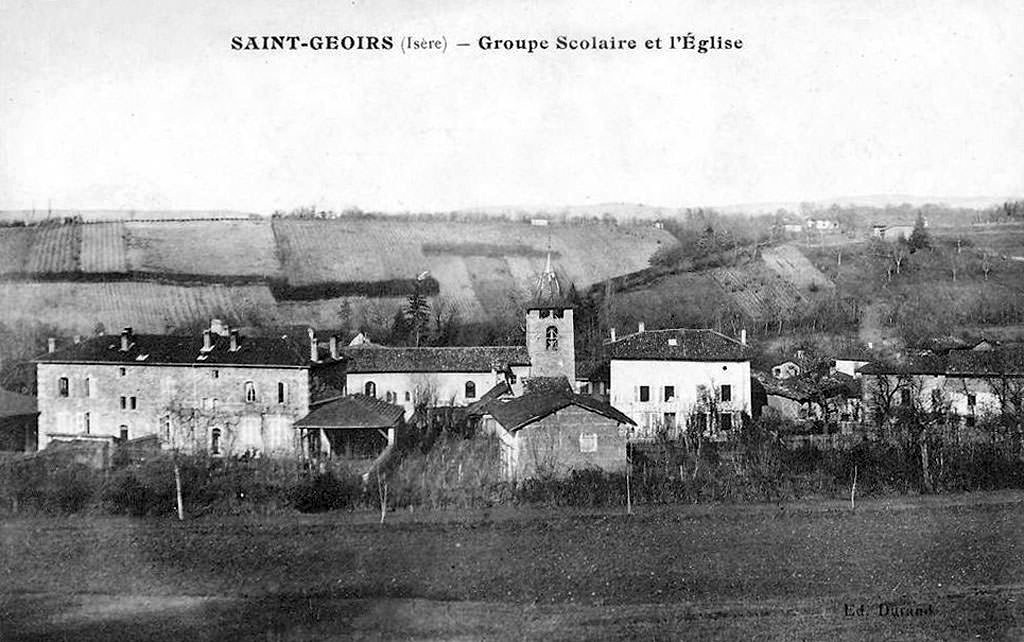
- Saint-Geoirs at the start of the 20th century
- Location of Saint-Geoirs
- Location within France Location within Auvergne-Rhône-Alpes
- Coordinates: 45°19′23″N 5°21′19″E
- Country: France
- Region: Auvergne-Rhône-Alpes
- Department: Isère
- Arrondissement: Vienne
- Canton: Bièvre
- Intercommunality: Bièvre Isère

Government
  - Mayor (2020–2026): Nadine Grangier
- Area^{1}: 6.93 km^{2} (2.68 sq mi)
- Elevation: 438 m (1,437 ft)
- Highest elevation: 747 m (2,451 ft)
- Lowest elevation: 414 m (1,358 ft)
- Population (2023): 498
  - Density: 71.9/km^{2} (186/sq mi)
- Time zone: UTC+01:00 (CET)
  - Summer (DST): UTC+02:00 (CEST)
- INSEE/Postal code: 38387 /38590
- ^{1} French Land Register data, which excludes lakes, ponds, glaciers > 1 km^{2} (0.386 sq mi or 247 acres) and river estuaries.

Saint-Geoirs (French pronunciation: [sɛ̃ ʒwaʁ]) is a commune in the Isère department in southeastern France.

== Population ==
Historical population
Year	Pop.	±% p.a.
1968	281	—
1975	269	−0.62%
1982	314	+2.23%
1990	354	+1.51%
1999	410	+1.65%
2007	476	+1.88%
2012	514	+1.55%
2017	516	+0.08%
2023	498	−0.59%
Source: INSEE

== See also ==
- Communes of the Isère department
