= Faramans, Isère =

Faramans
- Commune
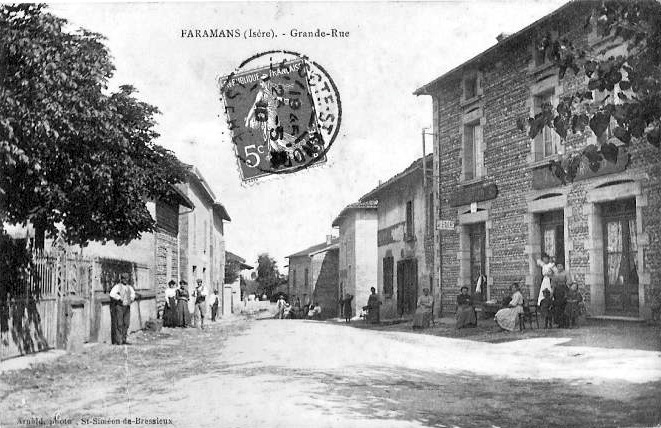
- The main road in 1910
- Location of Faramans
- Location within France Location within Auvergne-Rhône-Alpes
- Coordinates: 45°23′39″N 5°09′51″E
- Country: France
- Region: Auvergne-Rhône-Alpes
- Department: Isère
- Arrondissement: Vienne
- Canton: Bièvre

Government
  - Mayor (2020–2026): Gilles Bourdat
- Area^{1}: 10.79 km^{2} (4.17 sq mi)
- Highest elevation: 444 m (1,457 ft)
- Lowest elevation: 342 m (1,122 ft)
- Population (2023): 1,143
  - Density: 105.9/km^{2} (274.4/sq mi)
- Time zone: UTC+01:00 (CET)
  - Summer (DST): UTC+02:00 (CEST)
- INSEE/Postal code: 38161 /38260
- ^{1} French Land Register data, which excludes lakes, ponds, glaciers > 1 km^{2} (0.386 sq mi or 247 acres) and river estuaries.

Faramans is a commune in the Isère department of southeastern France.

== Population ==
Historical population
Year	Pop.	±% p.a.
1968	528	—
1975	515	−0.36%
1982	614	+2.54%
1990	679	+1.27%
1999	734	+0.87%
2007	868	+2.12%
2012	964	+2.12%
2017	1,038	+1.49%
2023	1,143	+1.62%
Source: INSEE

== See also ==
- Communes of the Isère department
