= Thodure =

- Commune
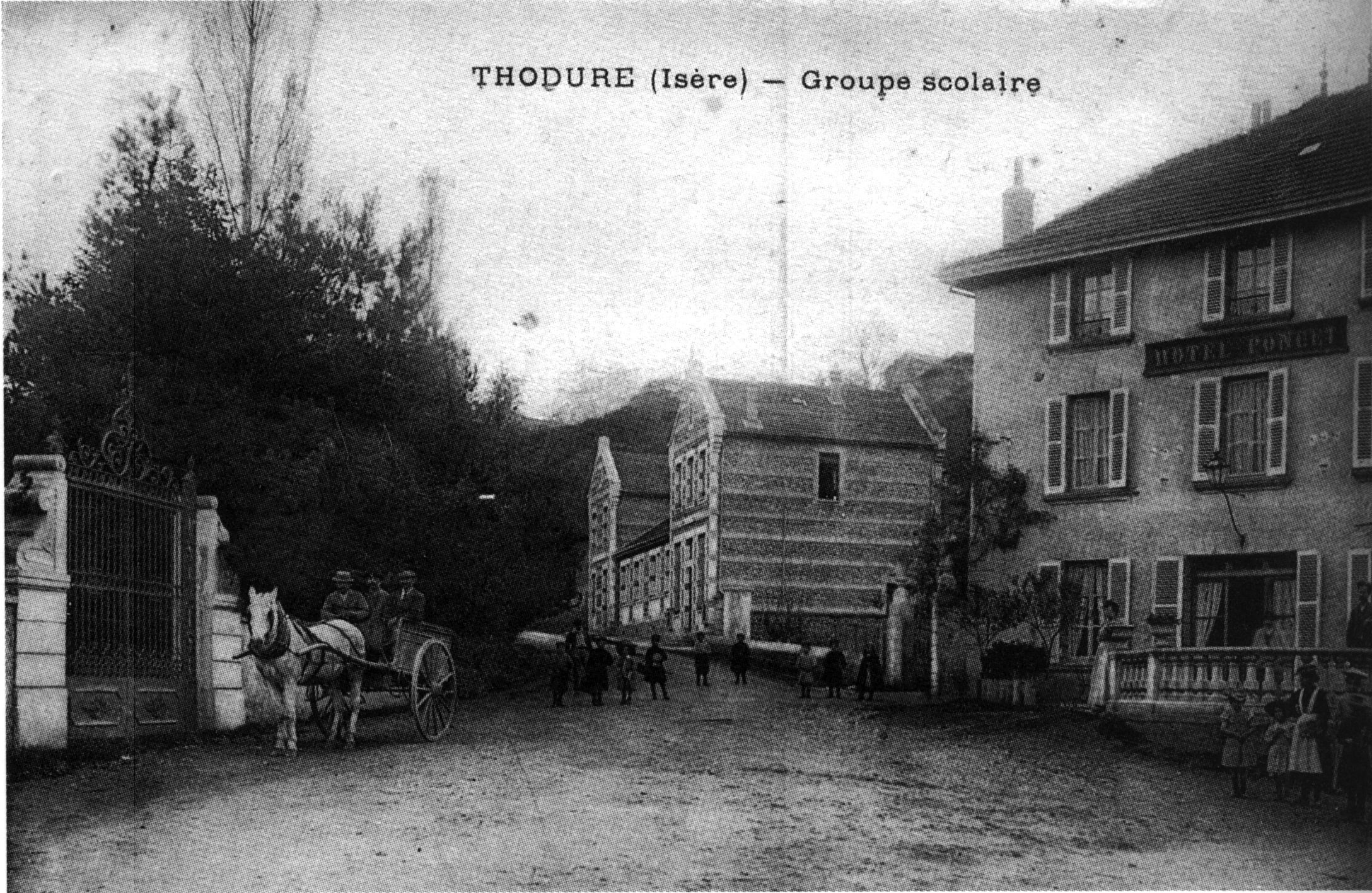
- Thodure in 1910

- Coat of arms
- Location of Thodure
- Location within France Location within Auvergne-Rhône-Alpes
- Coordinates: 45°19′03″N 5°10′09″E
- Country: France
- Region: Auvergne-Rhône-Alpes
- Department: Isère
- Arrondissement: Vienne
- Canton: Bièvre

Government
  - Mayor (2020–2026): Carole Fauchon
- Area^{1}: 14.43 km^{2} (5.57 sq mi)
- Elevation: 313 m (1,027 ft)
- Highest elevation: 492 m (1,614 ft)
- Lowest elevation: 287 m (942 ft)
- Population (2023): 795
  - Density: 55.1/km^{2} (143/sq mi)
- Time zone: UTC+01:00 (CET)
  - Summer (DST): UTC+02:00 (CEST)
- INSEE/Postal code: 38505 /38260
- ^{1} French Land Register data, which excludes lakes, ponds, glaciers > 1 km^{2} (0.386 sq mi or 247 acres) and river estuaries.

Thodure (French pronunciation: [tɔdyʁ]) is a commune in the Isère department in southeastern France.

== Population ==
Historical population
Year	Pop.	±% p.a.
1968	531	—
1975	495	−1.00%
1982	517	+0.62%
1990	520	+0.07%
1999	593	+1.47%
2007	659	+1.33%
2012	698	+1.16%
2017	743	+1.26%
2023	795	+1.13%
Source: INSEE

== See also ==
- Communes of the Isère department
