= Vienne, Isère =

Subprefecture in France

Vienne Vièna (Arpitan)
- Subprefecture
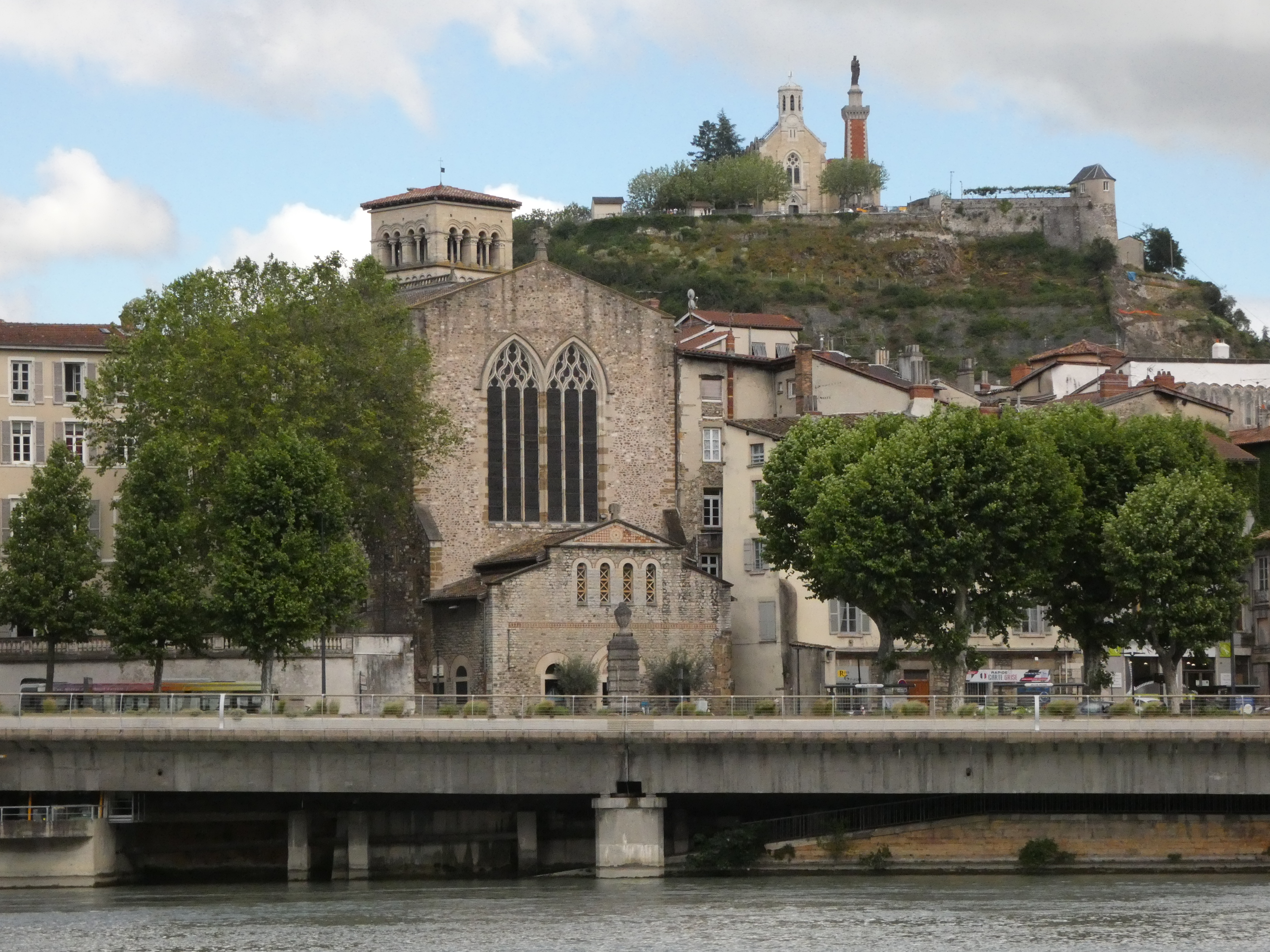
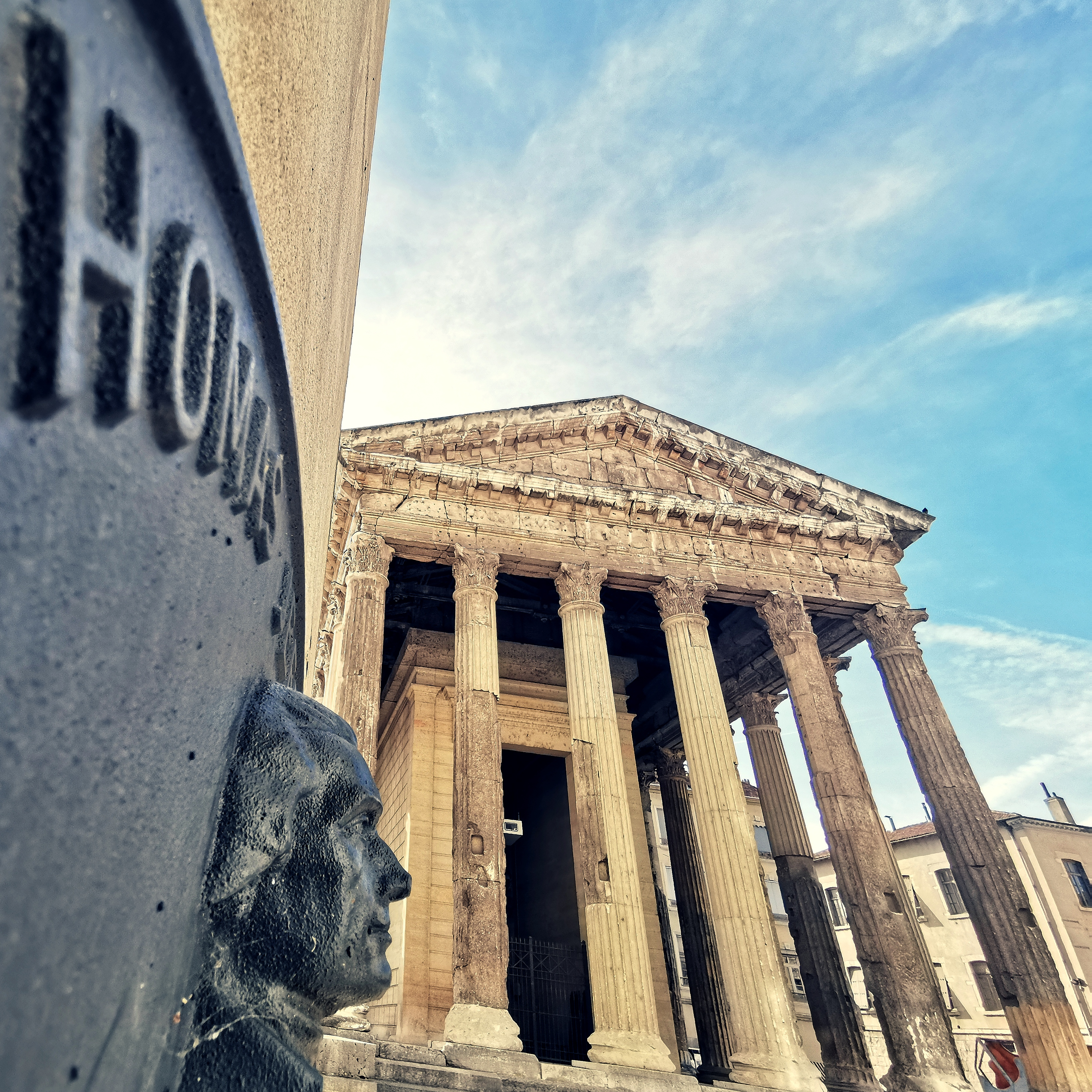
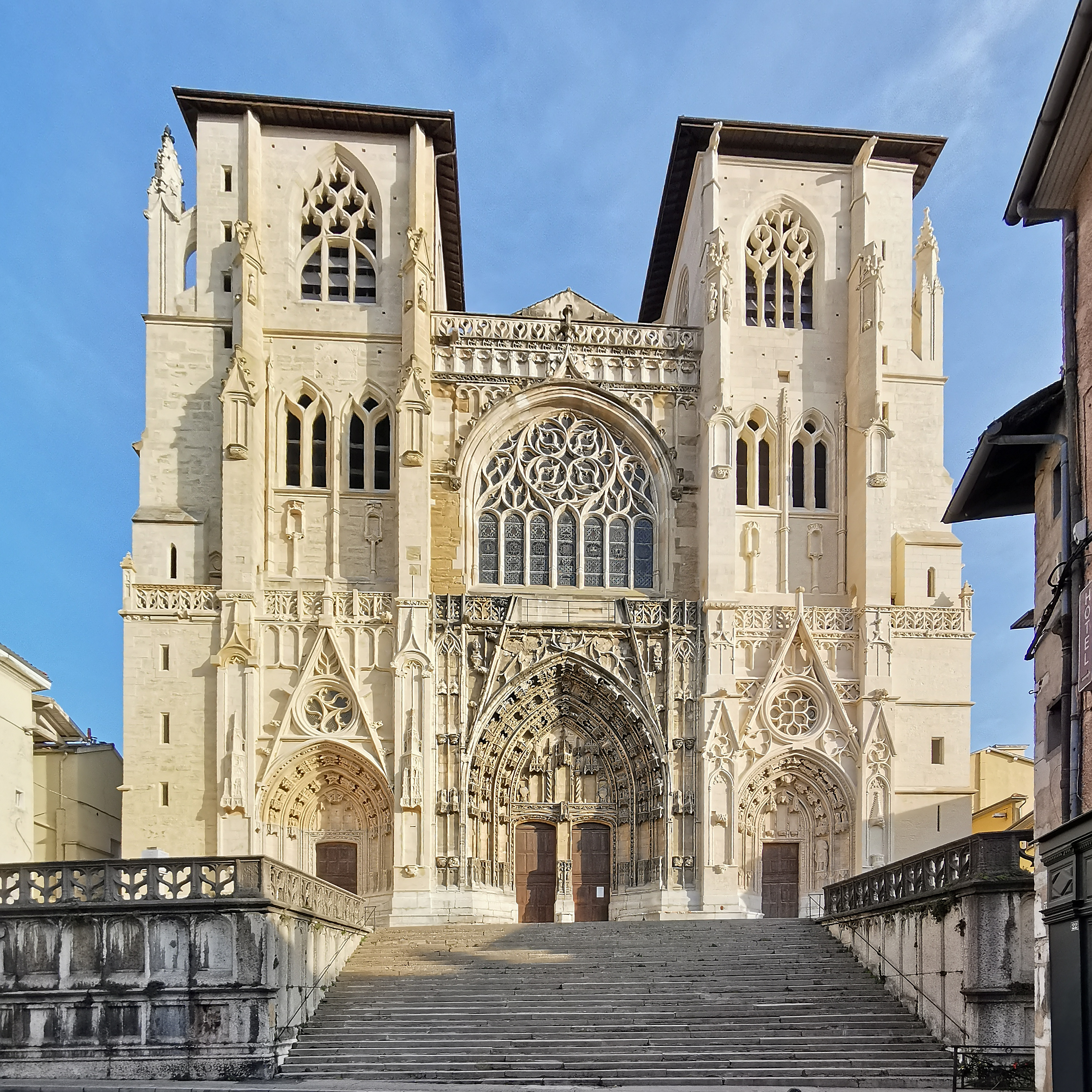
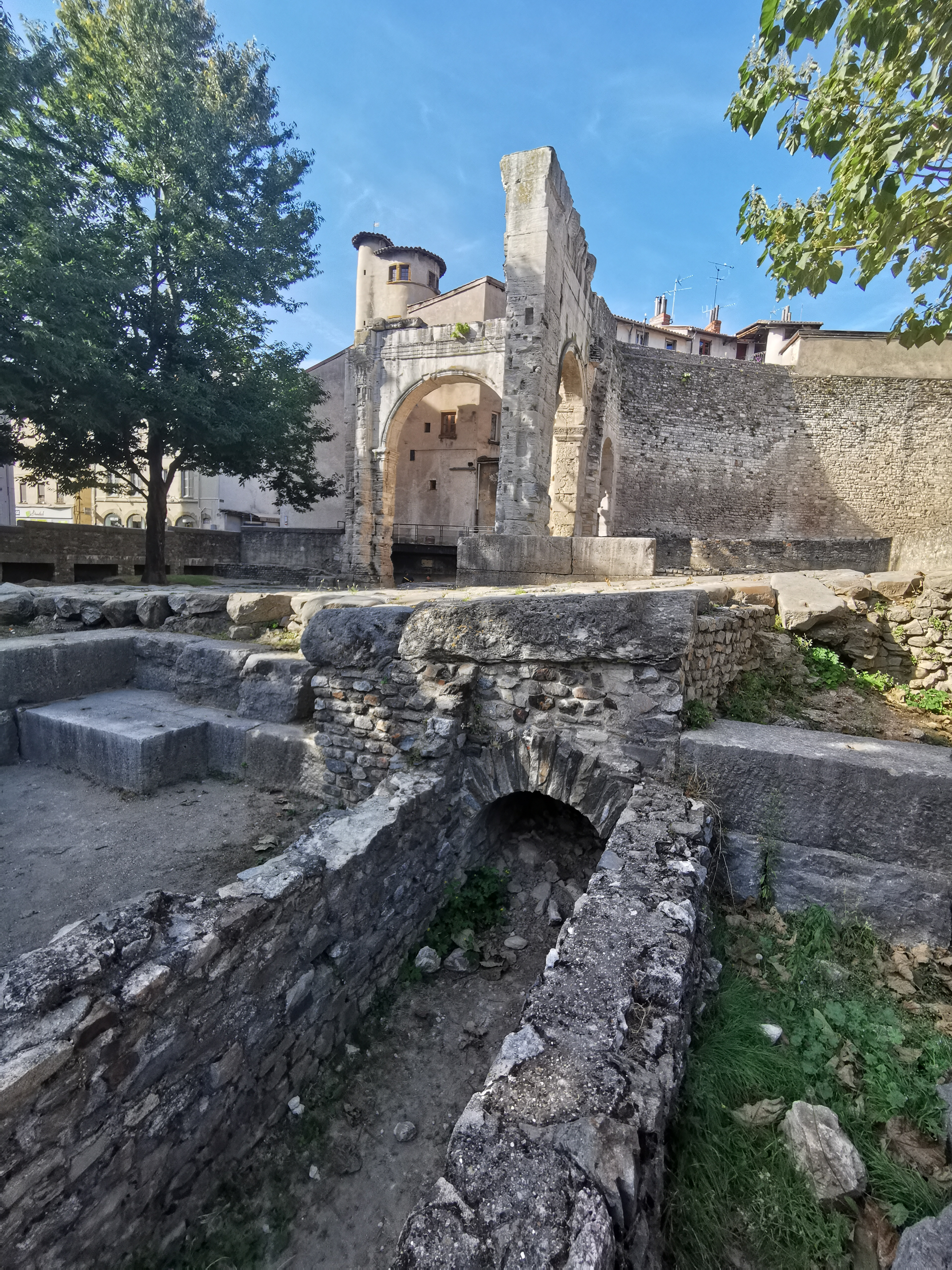
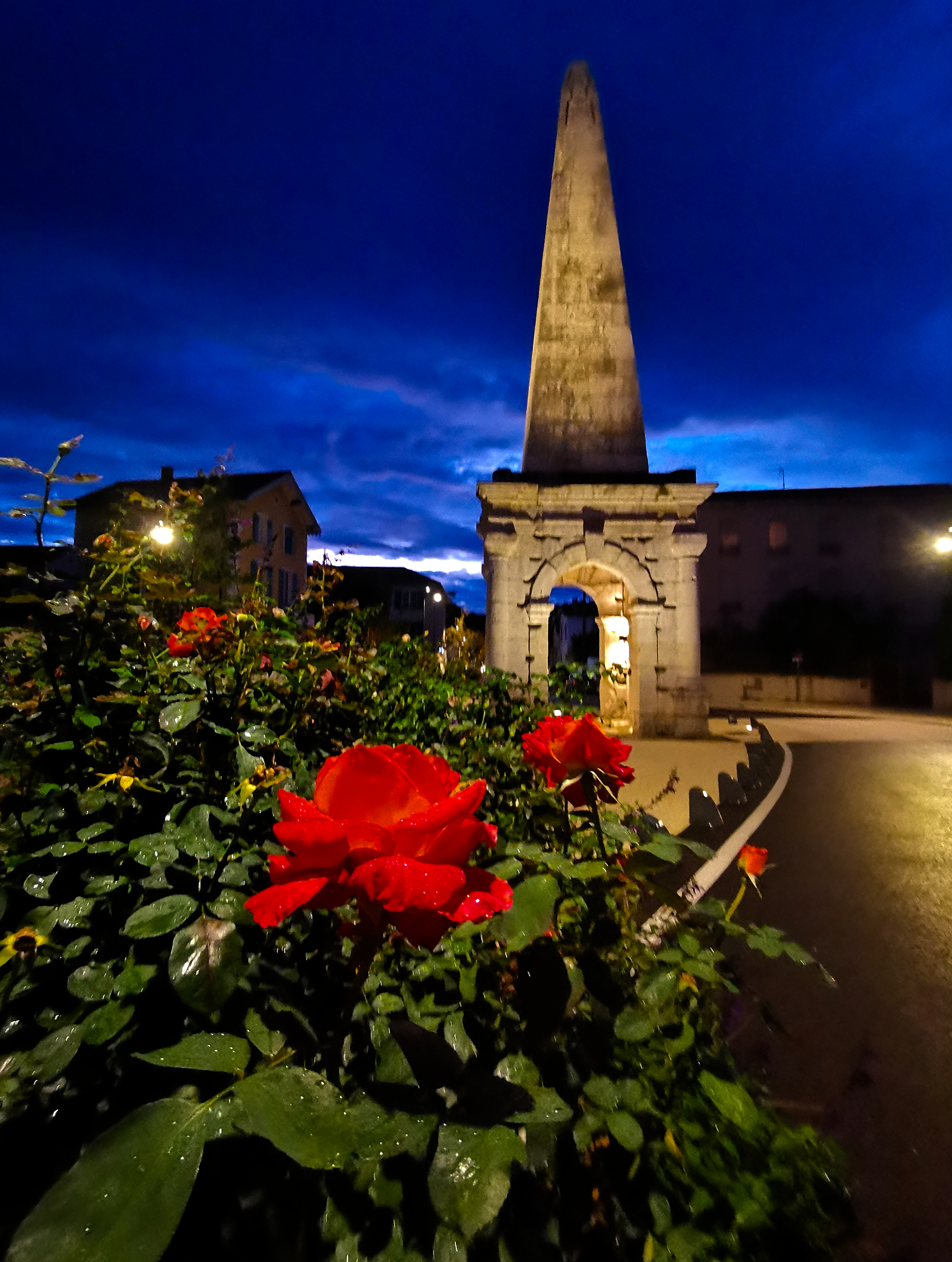
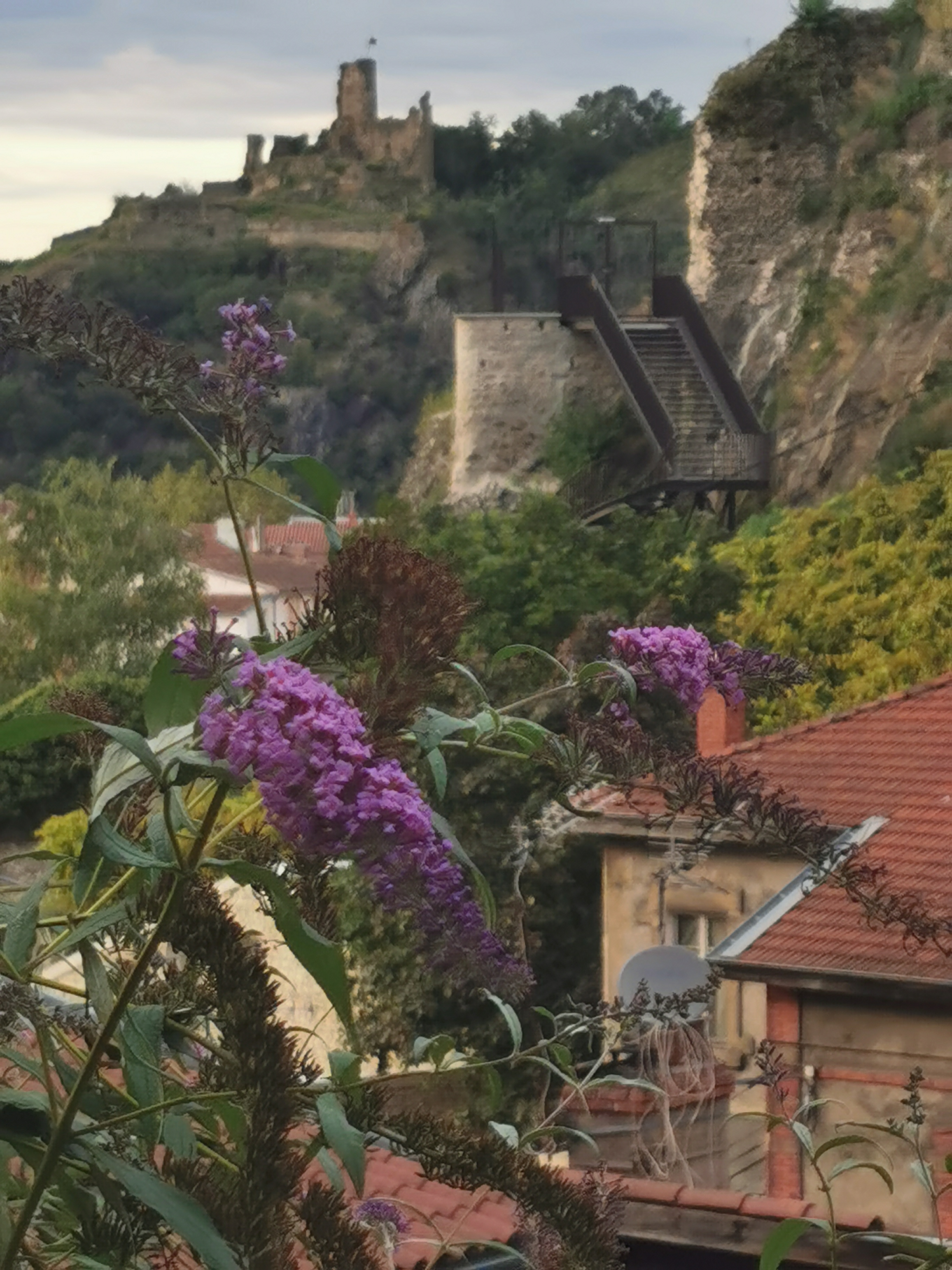
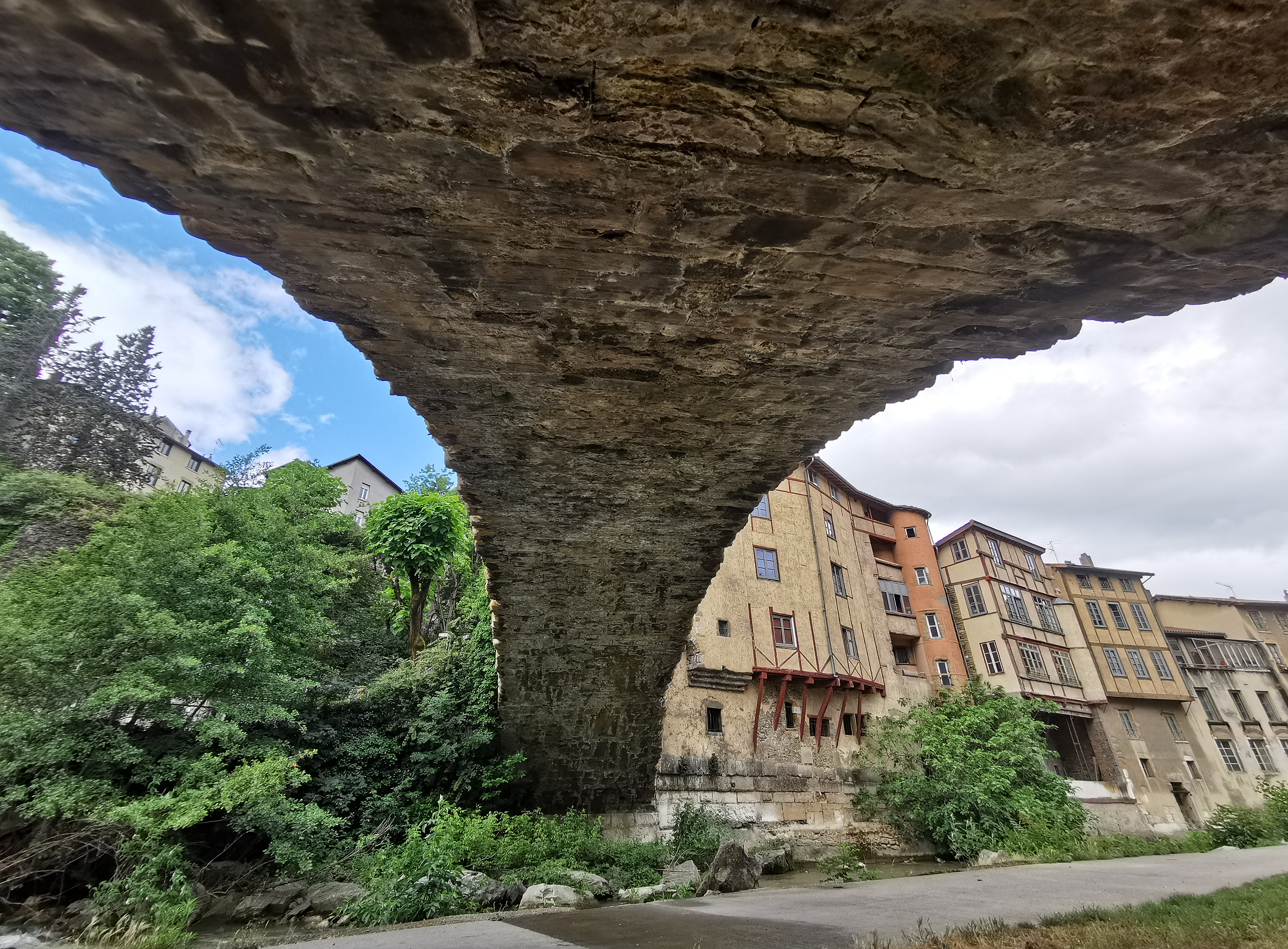
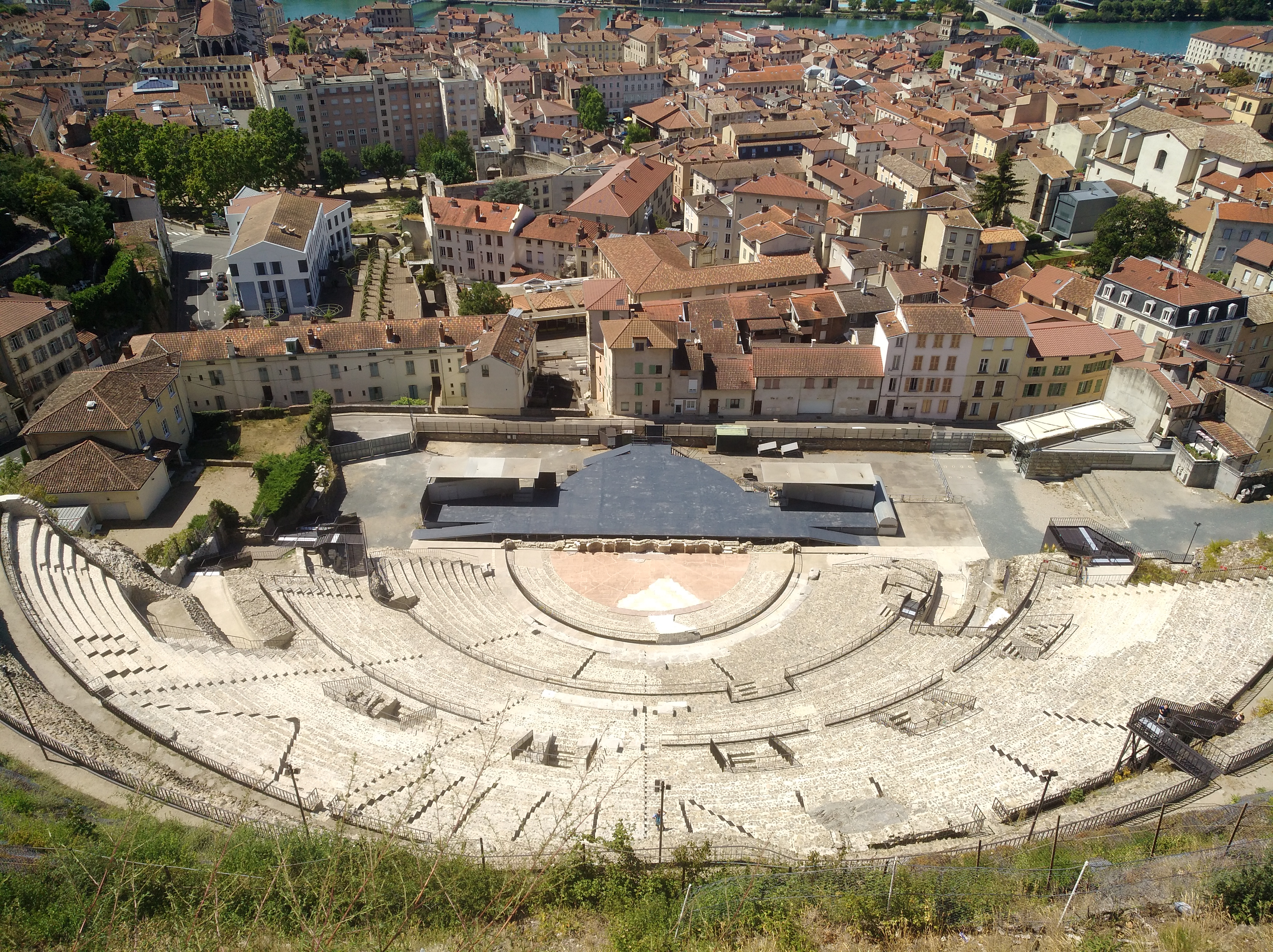
- From left to right, top to bottom: partial view of the city and the Rhône river from Saint-Romain-en-Gal with the Pipet sanctuary atop the hill; a bust of Thomas Jefferson in front of the Gallo-Roman temple of Augustus and Livia; the Saint-Maurice Cathedral; the archeological gardens of Cybèle; the Obelisk from the Gallo-Roman circus, rue Fernand Point; the Château de la Bâtie atop Mont Salomon; under the Saint-Martin bridge in the Gère valley; the Roman Theatre and the city from Pipet hill.

- Coat of arms
- Motto(s): Vienna Civitas Sancta "Vienne Saint City" (prior to 1887); Vienna Urbs Senatoria "Vienne Senatorial City" (since 1887)
- Location of Vienne
- Location within France Location within Auvergne-Rhône-Alpes
- Coordinates: 45°31′27″N 4°52′41″E
- Country: France
- Region: Auvergne-Rhône-Alpes
- Department: Isère
- Arrondissement: Vienne
- Canton: Vienne-1 and 2
- Intercommunality: CA Vienne Condrieu

Government
  - Mayor (2020–2026): Thierry Kovacs (LR)
- Area^{1}: 22.65 km^{2} (8.75 sq mi)
- Elevation: 169 m (554 ft)
- Highest elevation: 404 m (1,325 ft)
- Lowest elevation: 140 m (460 ft)
- Population (2023): 31,778
  - Density: 1,403/km^{2} (3,634/sq mi)
- Demonym: Viennois
- Time zone: UTC+01:00 (CET)
  - Summer (DST): UTC+02:00 (CEST)
- INSEE/Postal code: 38544 /38200
- ^{1} French Land Register data, which excludes lakes, ponds, glaciers > 1 km^{2} (0.386 sq mi or 247 acres) and river estuaries.

Vienne (French: [vjɛn]; Arpitan: Vièna) is a town in southeastern France, located 35 kilometres (22 mi) south of Lyon, at the confluence of the Gère and the Rhône. It is the fourth-largest commune in the Isère department, of which it is a subprefecture alongside La Tour-du-Pin. Vienne was a major centre of the Roman Empire under the Latin name Vienna.

Vienne was the capital of the Allobroges, a Gallic people, before its conquest by the Romans. Transformed into a Roman colony in 47 BC under Julius Caesar, it became a major urban centre, ideally located along the Rhône, then a major axis of communication. Emperor Augustus banished Herod the Great's son, the ethnarch Herod Archelaus to Vienne in 6 AD.

As Vienne was a Roman provincial capital, remains of Roman constructions are still widespread across it. The city was also an important early bishopric in Christian Gaul. Its most famous bishop was Avitus of Vienne. At the Council of Vienne, which was convened there in October 1311, Pope Clement V abolished the order of the Knights Templar. During the Middle Ages, Vienne was part of the Kingdom of Provence, part of the Holy Roman Empire; on the opposite bank of the Rhône was Kingdom of France, which made the city strategically important.

The town is now a regional commercial and industrial centre, known regionally for its Saturday market. A Roman temple, circus pyramid and theatre (where the annual Jazz à Vienne is held), as well as museums (archaeological, textile industry) and notable Catholic buildings, make tourism an important part of the town's economy.

== History ==
=== Roman Vienne ===
The oppidum of the Allobroges became a Roman colony about 47 BC under Julius Caesar, but the Allobroges managed to expel the Romans; the exiles then founded the colony of Lugdunum (today's Lyon). Herod Archelaus, the Ethnarch of Judea, was exiled here in 6 AD. During the early Empire, Vienna (as the Romans called it—not to be confused with today's Vienna, then known as Vindobona) regained all its former privileges as a Roman colony. In 260 Postumus was proclaimed Emperor here of a short-lived Gallo-Roman Empire. Later it became a provincial capital of the Dioecesis Viennensis.

Vienne became the seat of the vicar of prefects after the creation of regional dioceses, of which the date is still controversial. Regional dioceses were created during the First Tetrarchy, 293–305, or possibly later as some recent studies suggest in 313, but no later than the Verona List, which is securely dated to June 314.

On the bank of the Gère are traces of the ramparts of the old Roman city, and on Mont Pipet (east of the town) are the remains of a Roman theatre, while the thirteenth-century castle built on Mont Salomon on the orders of Archbishop Jean de Bernin is said to have been built on the site of a former Roman fort. Several ancient aqueducts remain in the Gère valley and parts of Roman roads are preserved (in particular in the city park).

Two important Roman monuments still stand at Vienne. One is the Early Imperial Temple of Augustus and Livia, a rectangular peripteral building of the Corinthian order, erected by the emperor Claudius, which owes its survival, like the Maison Carrée at Nîmes, to being converted to a church soon after the Theodosian decrees and later rededicated as "Notre Dame de Vie". During the Revolutionary Reign of Terror it was used for the local Festival of Reason. The other is the Plan de l'Aiguille, a truncated pyramid resting on a portico with four arches, from the Roman circus. Legends from the 13th century mention Pontius Pilate's death in Vienne. Later legends held that the pyramid was either the tomb of Herod Archelaus or of Pontius Pilate.

The vestiges of a temple to Cybèle were discovered in 1945 when a new hospital was built on Mount Salomon and the Ancien Hôpital in the center of town was torn down. Subsequent archaeological research conducted in 1965 permitted detailed reconstruction of the floor plan for the temple as well as the surrounding forum and established that the temple was constructed in the first century AD.

=== Christian Vienne ===
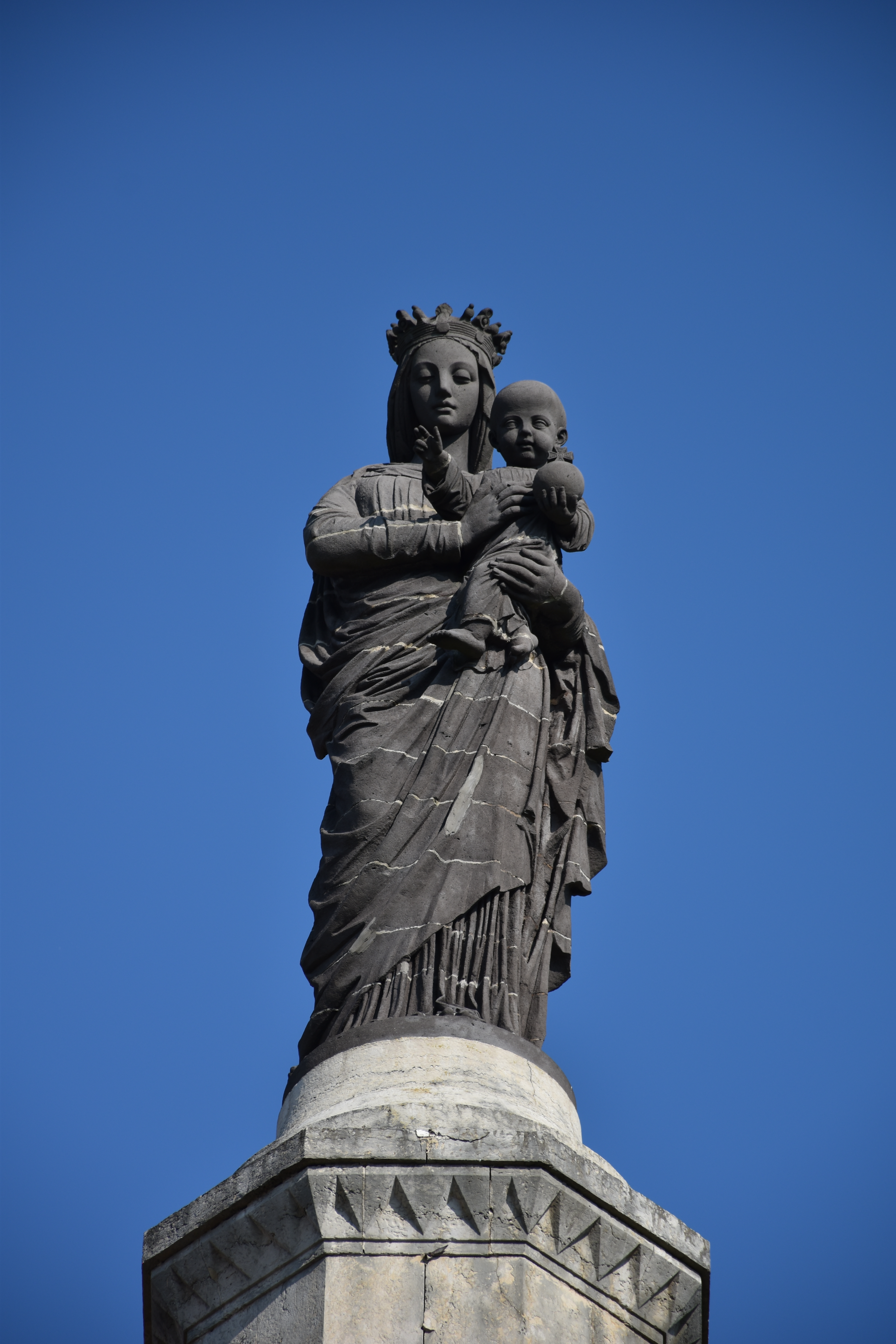
Léonard Périer, Virgin and Child, colossal statue overlooking Vienne from the Pipet hill

The provincial capital was an important early seat of a bishop and the legendary first bishop is said to have been Crescens, a disciple of Paul. There were Christians here in 177 when the churches of Vienne and Lyon addressed a letter to those of Asia and Phrygia, and mention is made of Sanctus, a deacon of Vienne (Eusebius of Caesarea, Church History). The first historical bishop was Verus, who was present at the Council of Arles (314). About 450, Vienne's bishops became archbishops, several of whom played an important cultural role, e.g. Mamertus, who established Rogation pilgrimages, and the poet, Avitus (498–518). Vienne's archbishops and those of Lyon disputed the title of "Primate of All the Gauls" based on the dates of founding of the cities compared to the dates of founding of the bishoprics. Vienne's archbishopric was suppressed in 1790, during the French Revolution and officially terminated 11 years later by the Concordat of 1801.

=== Burgundian Vienne ===
Vienne was a target during the Migration Period: it was taken by the Burgundians in 438, but re-taken by the Romans and held until 461, when it was incorporated again into the Kingdom of the Burgundians. In 534, the Franks captured Vienne, and annexed it into the Merovingian state. It was sacked by the Lombards in 558, and later by the Moors in 737. When Carolingian Empire was divided into three parts by the Treaty of Verdun (843), Vienne became part of Middle Francia. Under the Treaty of Prüm (855), it became part of the Burgundian realm of Charles of Provence (d. 863).

King Charles II the Bald assigned the Viennois district in 869 to Comte Boso of Provence, who in 879 proclaimed himself king of Provence and on his death in 887 was buried at Vienne in the cathedral church of St. Maurice. Vienne then continued as capital of the Kingdom of Provence, and from 933 of the Kingdom of Burgundy until 1032, when the region was incorporated into the Holy Roman Empire.

The temporal rule over the city was exercised by the archbishops of Vienne. Their rights were repeatedly recognized, but they had various local rivals, mainly in the counts of Albon, who were styled as "dauphins of Viennois", since they held much of the region of Viennois, but did not hold power over the city itself. In 1349, dauphin Humbert II sold his domains in Dauphiné to the french king Philip VI, but the archbishop stood firm and the city of Vienne was not included in this sale, remaining under the archiepiscopal rule until the middle of the 15th century, when it was finally incorporated into Dauphiné.

Gui de Bourgogne, who was archbishop from 1090 to 1119, was elected pope in 1119 and served as Callixtus II until his death in 1124.

Jean de Bernin drew up a municipal charter (charte des franchises) for Vienne around 1225 (including provisions for a town council). Nevertheless, it was only in the fifteenth century that the coat of arms (Vienna civitas sancta) with an elm tree is attested (based on a tree uprooted around 1430 from near Saint-André-le-bas).

The Council of Vienne was the fifteenth Ecumenical Council of the Roman Catholic Church that met between 1311 and 1312 in Vienne. Its principal act was to withdraw papal support for the Knights Templar on the instigation of Philip IV of France.

The archbishops gave up their territorial powers over Vienne to the Dauphin of Viennois in 1448-1450.

=== Reformation and Renaissance ===
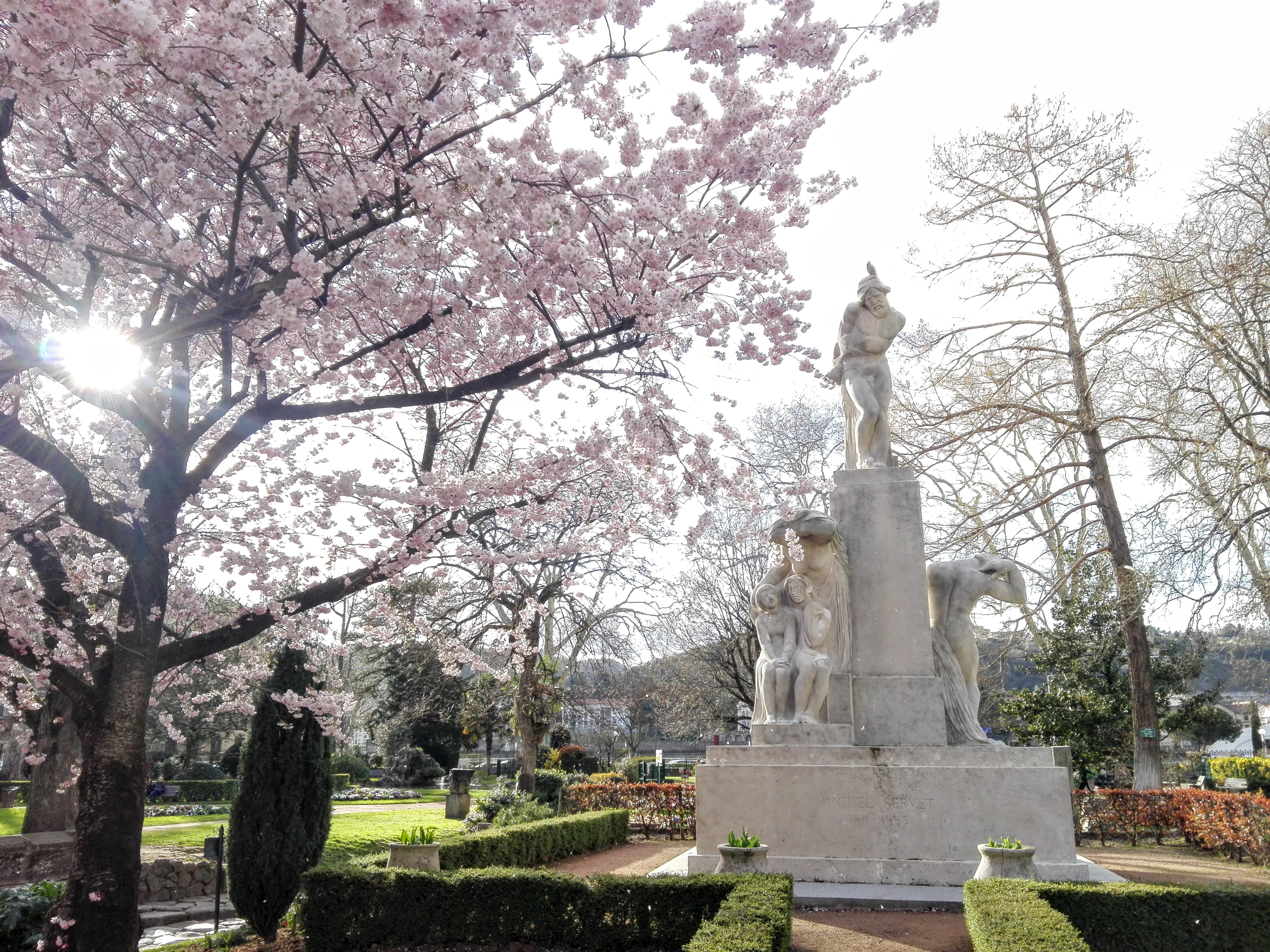
Joseph Bernard's statue of Michael Servetus in the city park

Between 1482 and 1527, French kings appointed four Italians as archbishop of Vienne in succession, beginning with Angelo Cato, a doctor and astrologer. The last of these, Scaramuccia Trivulzio, died in Rome before he could take possession of the archbishopric, which allowed for the confirmation of Pierre Palmier, elected by the canons of Saint-Maurice in an act of resistance to the royal practice of appointing foreign prelates. At this time, there was no shortage of priests: a 1551 consular document indicated that over 5000 masses were celebrated each year in Vienne.

As a result of a 1540 printers' strike in Lyon, Michael Servetus' publisher moved to Vienne, where Pierre Palmier had invited his former teacher to come live. From 1541, Servetus worked as a doctor in the town, where he was known as Michel de Villeneuve, but also participated in decisions related to town infrastructure (rebuilding the Saint-Sévère bridge over the Gère after the 13 October 1544 flood). In January 1553 his Christianismi Restitutio (Note: The title of the book deliberately echoes Calvin's Institutio Christianae Religionis.) was published anonymously in Vienne in a clandestine workshop, after being refused by a publisher in Basel. Jean Frellon, a Lyon bookseller, sent a copy to the theologian John Calvin, because Servetus had included his correspondence with Calvin in the book. Calvin, who viewed Servetus as a delirious braggart, insinuated dire consequences should Servetus come to Geneva. (Note: Writing to William Farel of Servetus' "Thrasonic bravado" in 1546, and of the latter's announced plan to visit him in Geneva, Calvin said that as long as his voice carried weight in Geneva, should Servetus come, he would never return home alive —a wish that came to be fulfilled seven years later.) In the book, Servetus was also critical of the Pope and the Roman church, particularly of the doctrine of the Trinity and of child baptism. By order of Cardinal François de Tournon and Archbishop Palmier, he was arrested on 5 April 1553. Questioned for the next two days by the inquisitor Matthieu Ory, among others, he denied that he was Servetus, saying he had usurped the name for his correspondence with Calvin. On the morning of the third day, he managed to escape from the prison due to the special privileges accorded him by the bailliff. Ory recommended that he be found guilty of heresy, which was done on 17 June, when he was condemned to be burned at the stake, along with his books, in a then-undeveloped area of the Saint-Martin neighbourhood.

Vienne was sacked in 1562 by the Protestants under the baron des Adrets, and was held by the Catholic League from 1590 until 1595, when it was taken in the name of King Henry IV by Henri de Montmorency. The fortifications were demolished between 1589 and 1636. The Hôtel de Ville was commissioned as a private residence in the late 17th century.

=== Industrial era ===
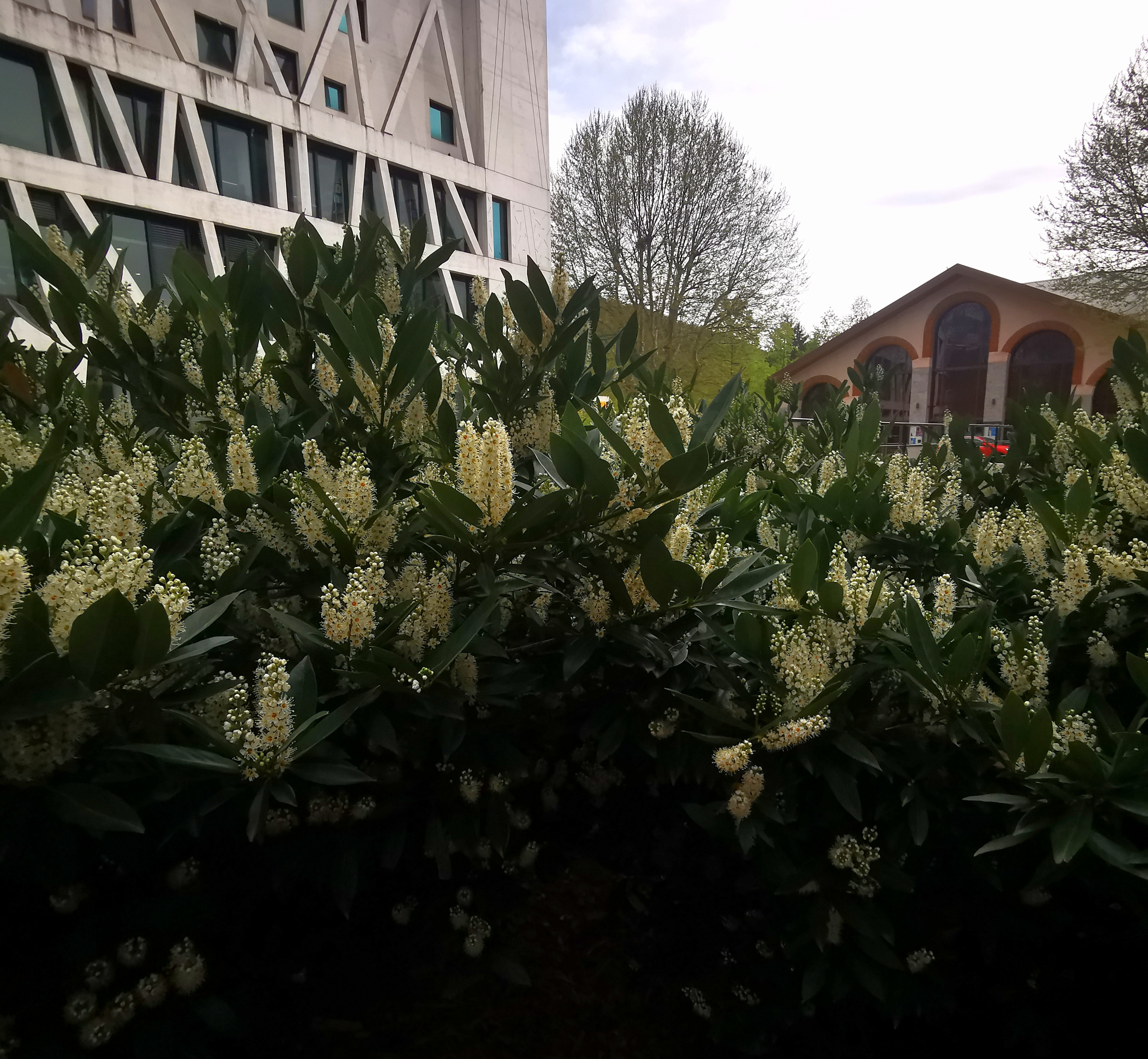
On the right, the manège (1886) of the former cavalry regiment in the Saint-Germain neighbourhood, now a concert hall

Train stations were built in Vienne in 1855 and in Estressin in 1875 providing freight transport to the textile and metallurgy industries, which took advantage of the water power in the Gère valley.

In 1875, the State signed a contract with Vienne for the establishment of a cavalry regiment, necessitating the construction of a barracks from 1882 to 1886 in what became known as the Quartier Saint-Germain in 1887. When the last military regiment was disbanded in 1990, the former barracks was transformed into a business center, with some of the buildings conserved, such as the riding academy, which became a concert hall in 2018.

== Population ==
Historical population

Year	Pop.	±% p.a.
1793	12,035	—
1800	10,362	−2.12%
1806	11,188	+1.29%
1821	11,273	+0.05%
1831	14,079	+2.25%
1836	16,484	+3.20%
1841	17,587	+1.30%
1846	18,610	+1.14%
1851	20,753	+2.20%
1856	19,698	−1.04%
1861	20,708	+1.01%
1866	23,605	+2.65%
1872	26,017	+1.63%
1876	26,502	+0.46%
1881	26,060	−0.34%
1886	25,480	−0.45%
1891	24,817	−0.53%
1896	24,977	+0.13%
1901	24,619	−0.29%

Year	Pop.	±% p.a.
1906	24,887	+0.22%
1911	24,711	−0.14%
1921	23,732	−0.40%
1926	25,092	+1.12%
1931	25,648	+0.44%
1936	25,436	−0.17%
1946	23,519	−0.78%
1954	25,669	+1.10%
1962	26,977	+0.62%
1968	29,057	+1.25%
1975	27,830	−0.61%
1982	28,294	+0.24%
1990	29,449	+0.50%
1999	29,975	+0.20%
2007	29,844	−0.05%
2012	29,077	−0.52%
2017	29,306	+0.16%
2023	31,778	+1.36%

Source: EHESS and INSEE (1968–2023)

== Monuments ==
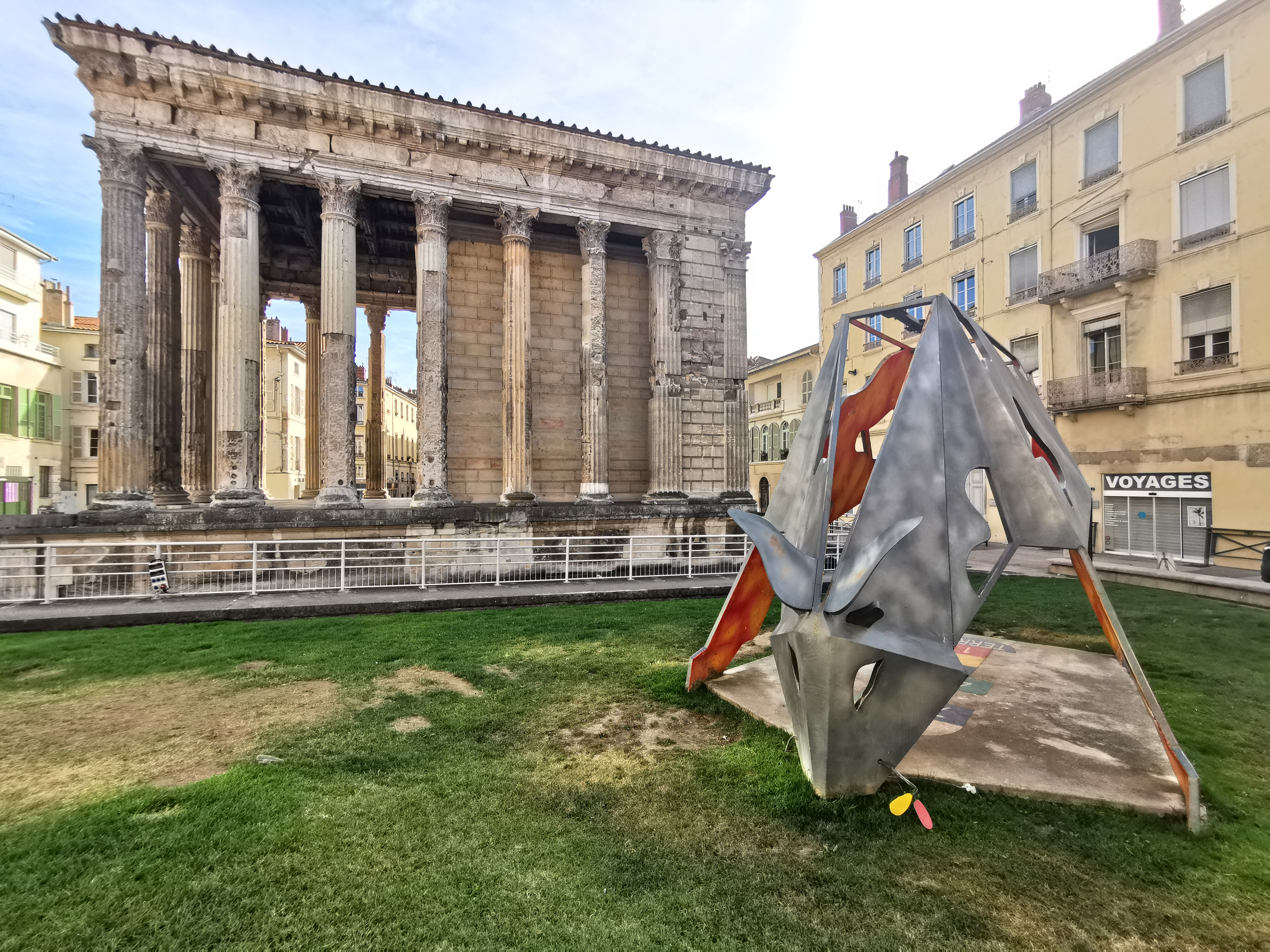
The Roman temple (Temple d'Auguste et de Livie, Temple of Augustus and Livia) in Vienne

The two outstanding Roman remains in Vienne are the temple of Augustus and Livia, and the Plan de l'Aiguille or Pyramide, a truncated pyramid resting on a portico with four arches, which was associated with the city's Roman circus.

The early Romanesque church of Saint Peter belonged to an ancient Benedictine abbey and was rebuilt in the ninth century, with tall square piers and two ranges of windows in the tall aisles and a notable porch. It is one of France's oldest Christian buildings dating from the 5th century laid-out in the form of a basilica and having a large and well constructed nave. It also has a Romanesque tower and a sculptured South portal containing a statue of Saint Peter. Today, the building houses a lapidary museum that holds a Junon head and a statue of Tutela, the city's protective divinity.

The Gothic former cathedral of St Maurice was built between 1052 and 1533. It is a basilica, with three aisles and an apse, but no ambulatory or transepts. It is 315 feet (96 m) in length, 118 feet (36 m) wide and 89 feet (27 m) in height. The most striking portion is the west front, which rises majestically from a terrace overhanging the Rhône. Its sculptural decoration was badly damaged by the Protestants in 1562 during the Wars of Religion.

The Romanesque church of St André en Bas was the church of a second Benedictine monastery, and became the chapel of the earlier kings of Provence. It was rebuilt in 1152, in the later Romanesque style.

The Monument aux Morts in front of the train station is the work of Claude Grange and was inaugurated on 9 September 1923 by Philippe Pétain.

== Gallery ==
Claude Grange's Monument aux Morts in front of the Vienne train station

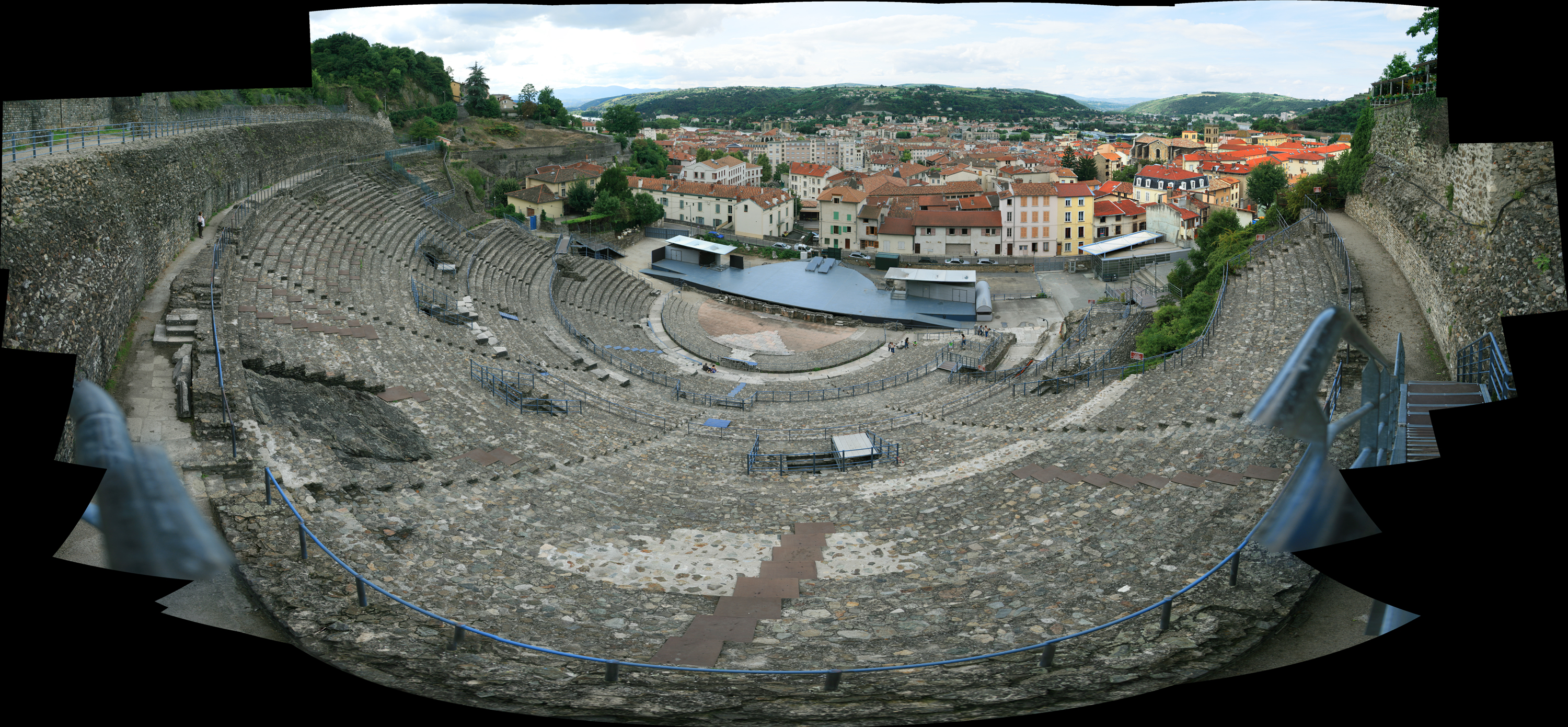
Vienne's Roman theatre

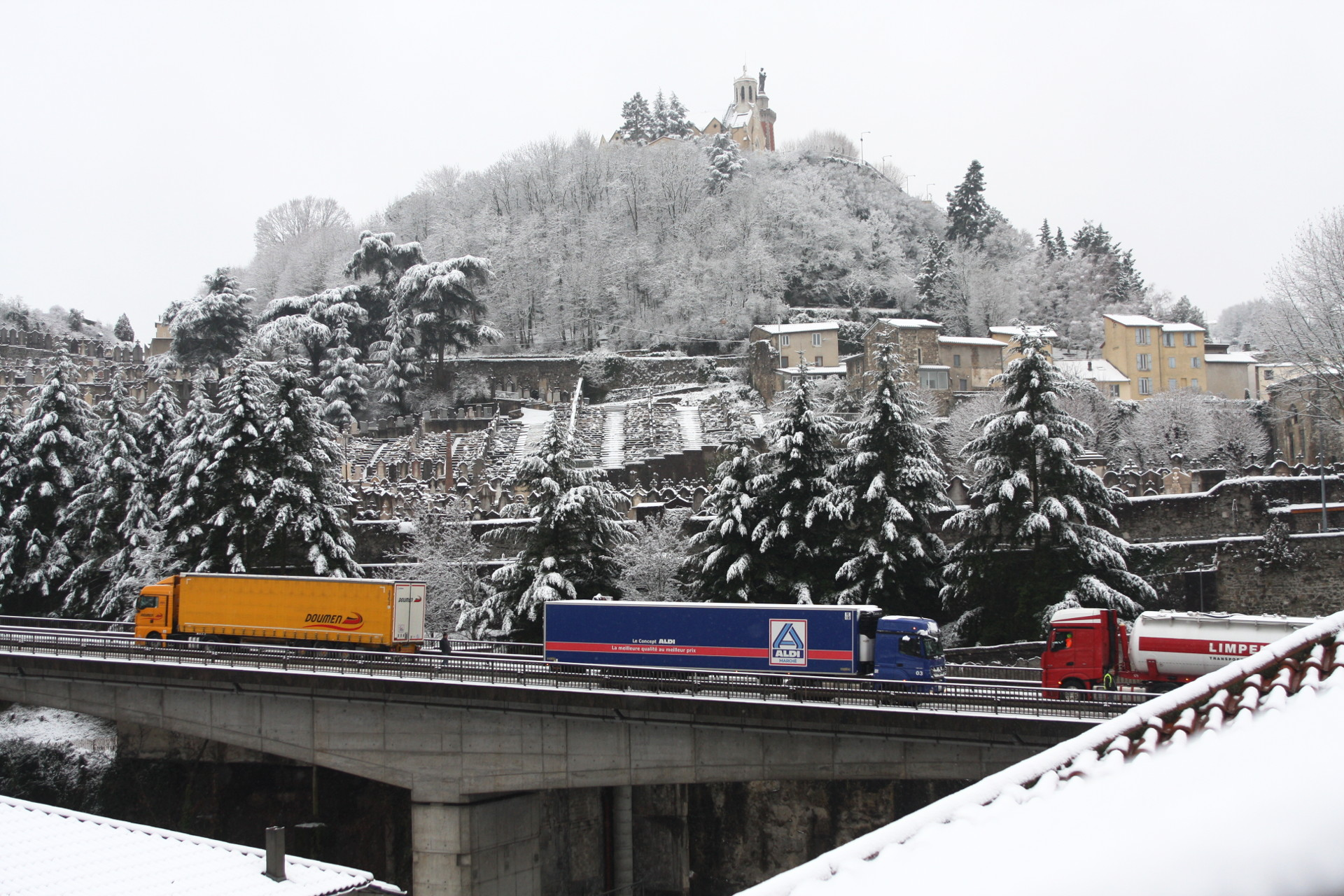
Pipet cemetery, Chemin des Aqueducs (D41), Notre Dame de Pipet

the 13th stage of the 2022 Tour de France took the Chemin des Aqueducs into Vienne

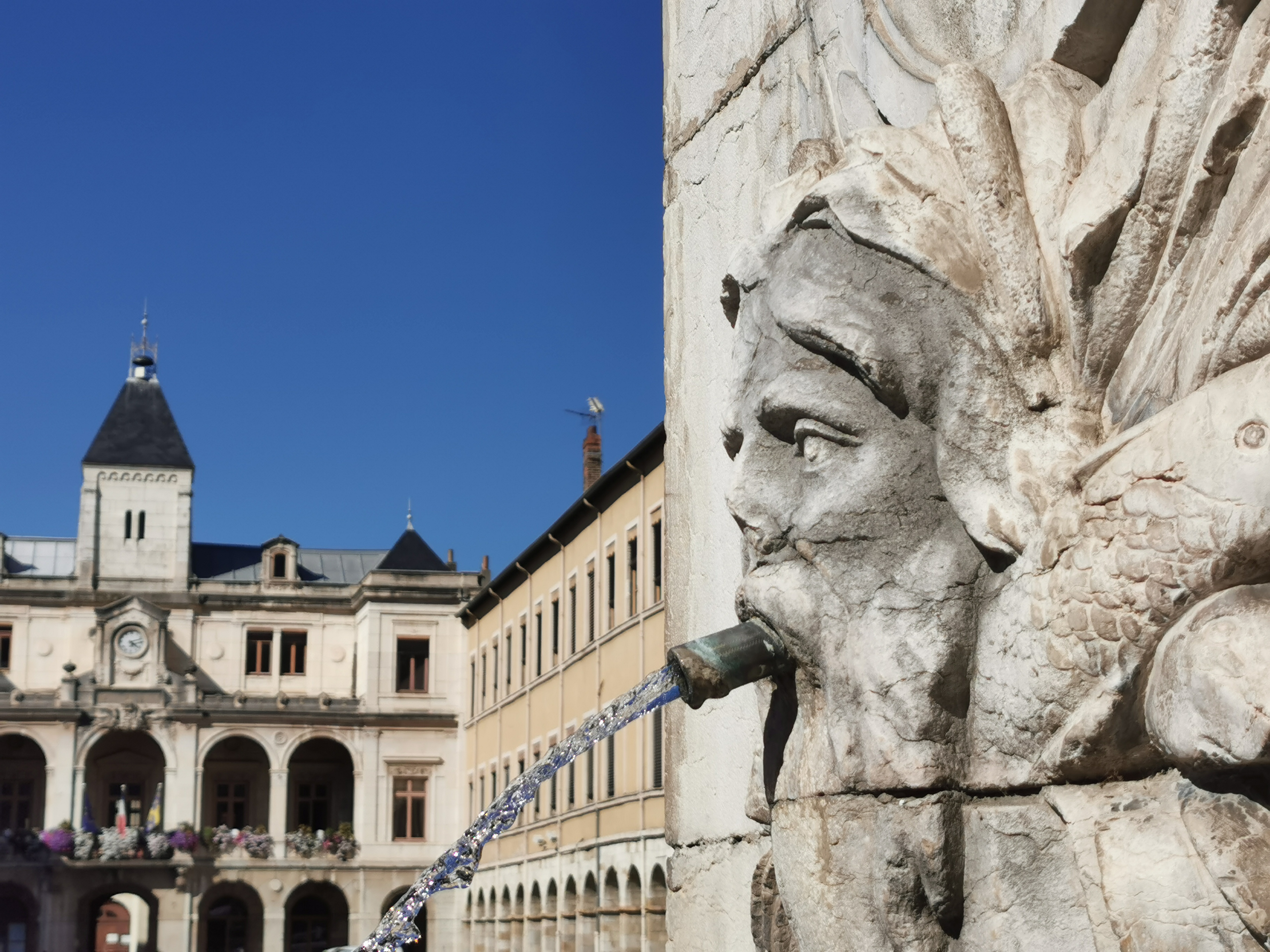
The Hôtel de Ville

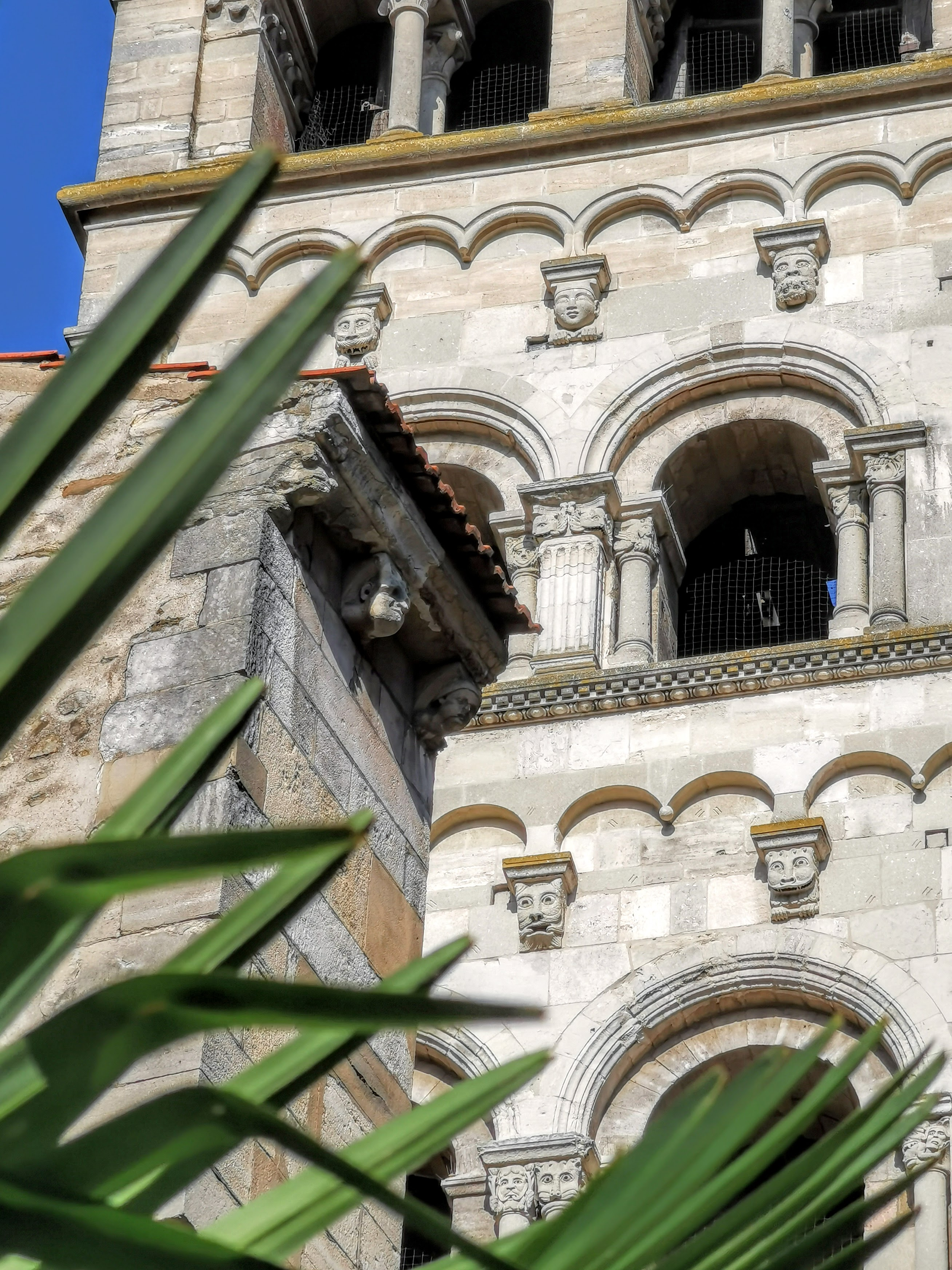
16 of the Saint-André le Bas Abbey's chimerae

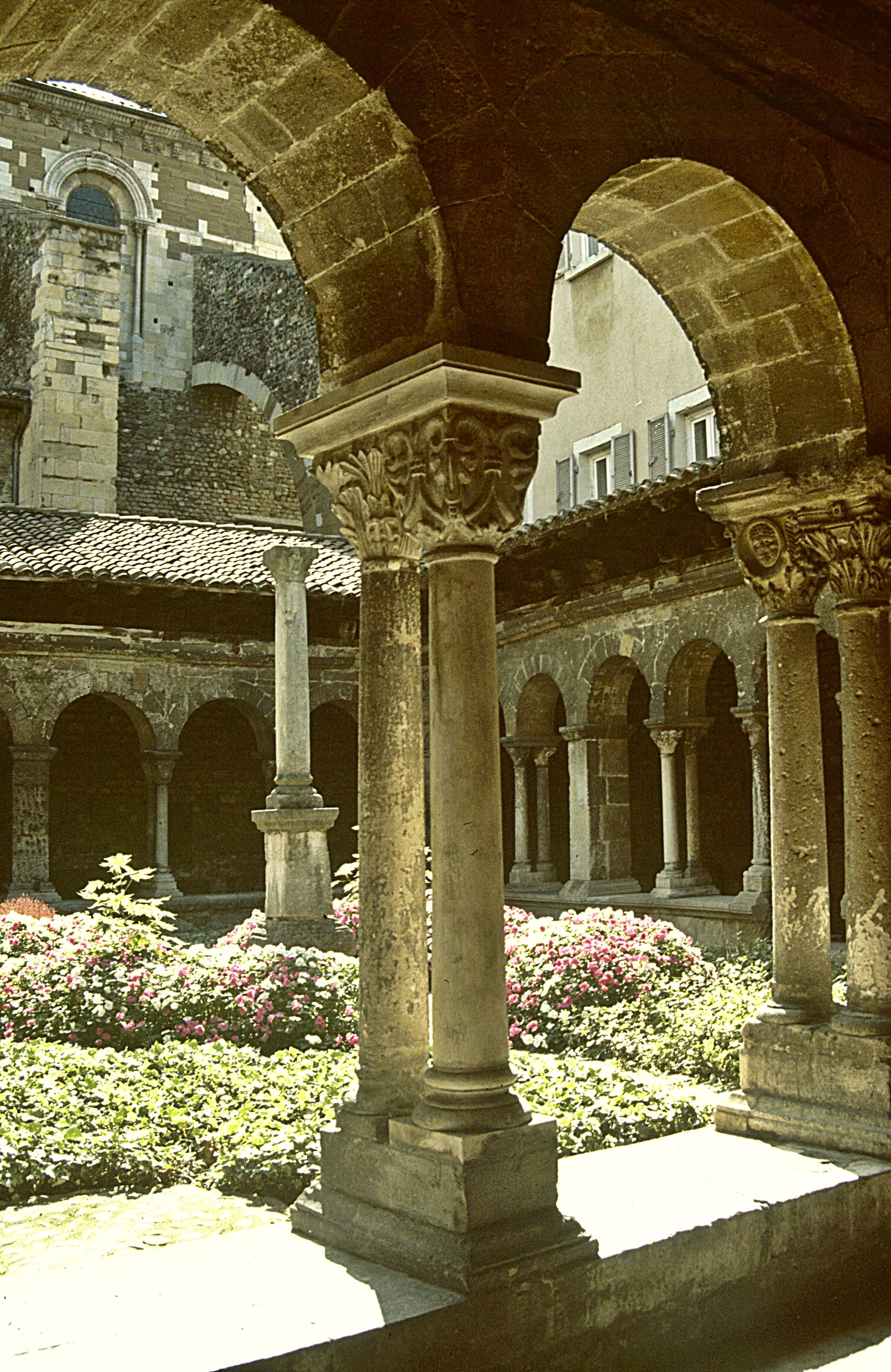
Saint-André le Bas Abbey courtyard

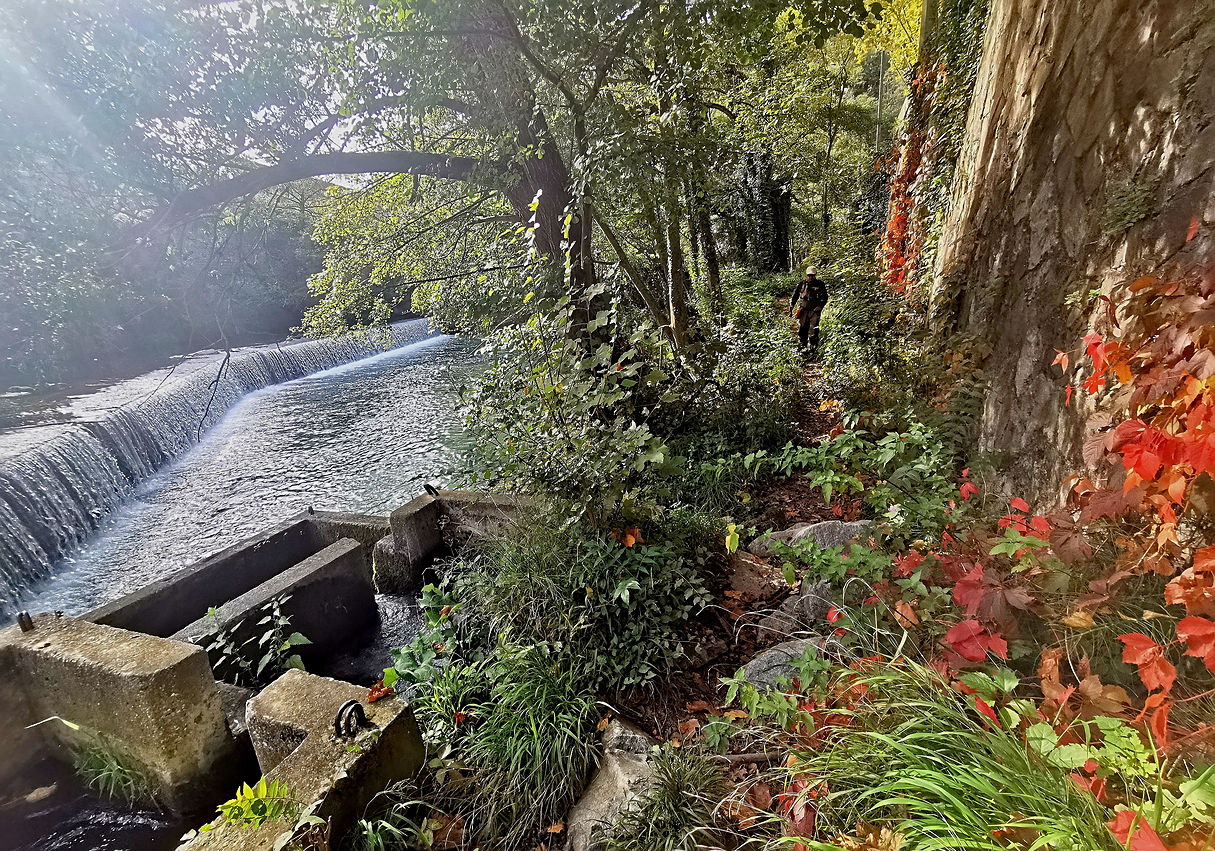
The Gère River is a popular fishing spot.

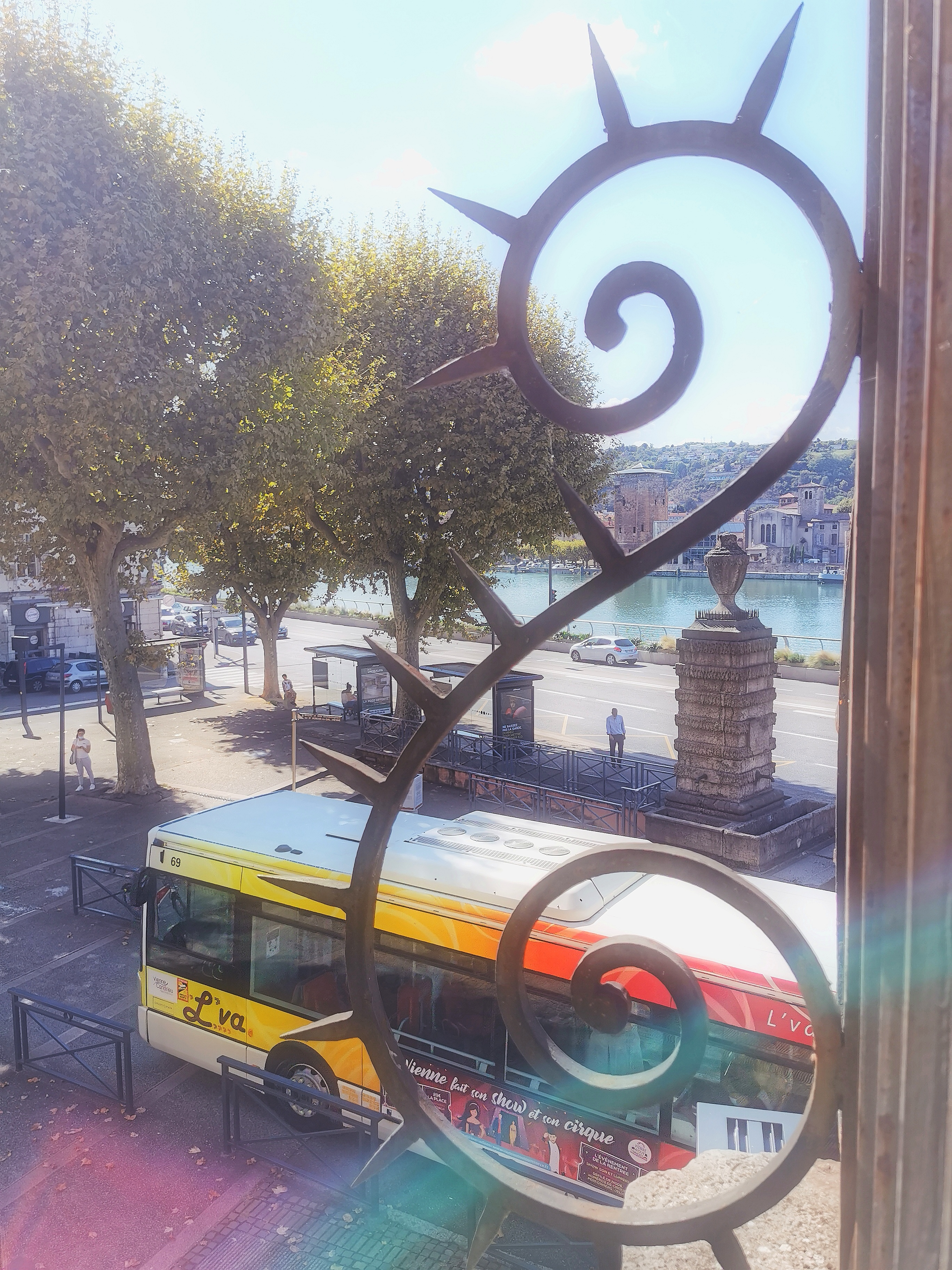
Jeu du paume square (bus hub)

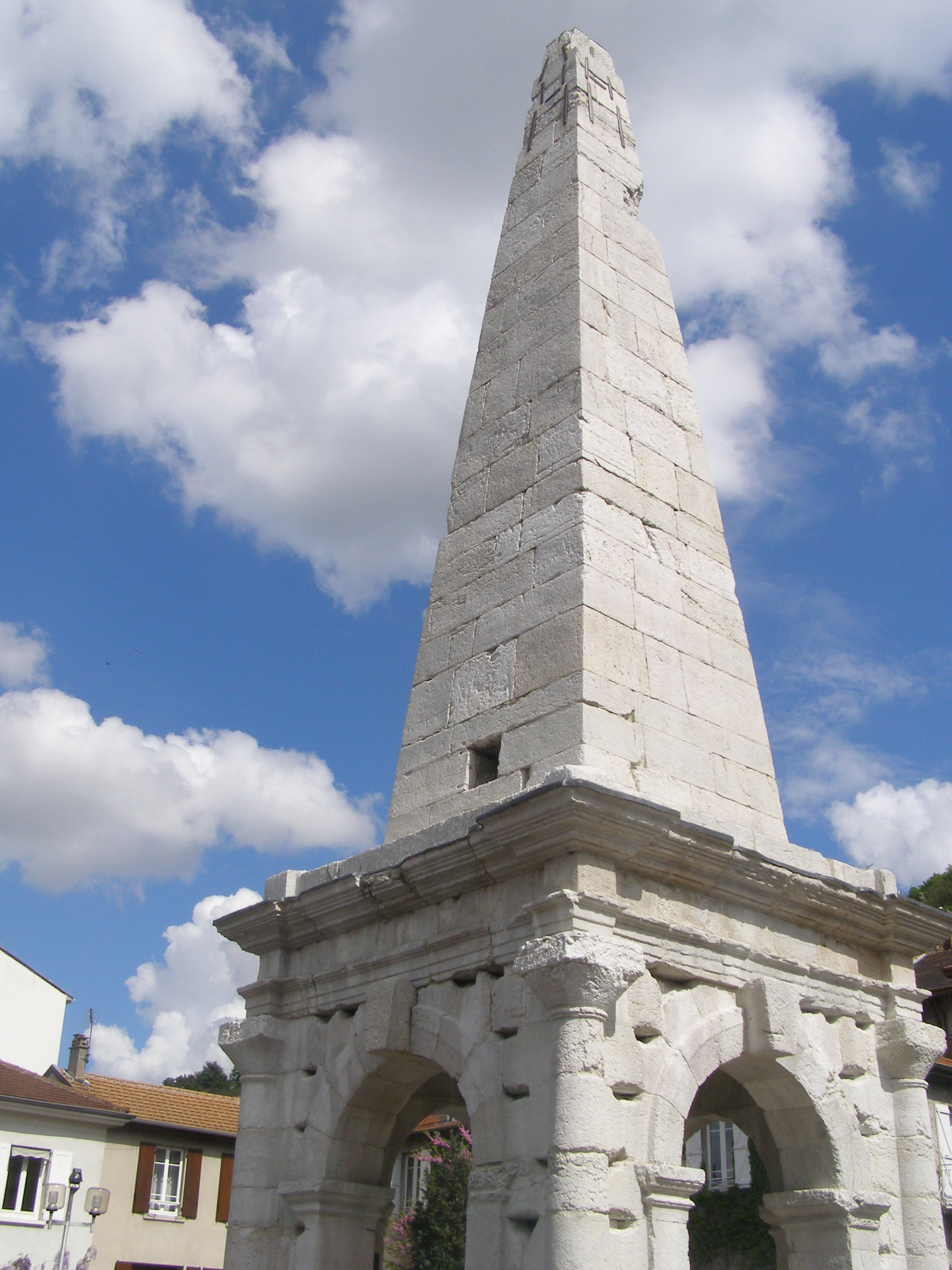
The Gallo-Roman Pyramid

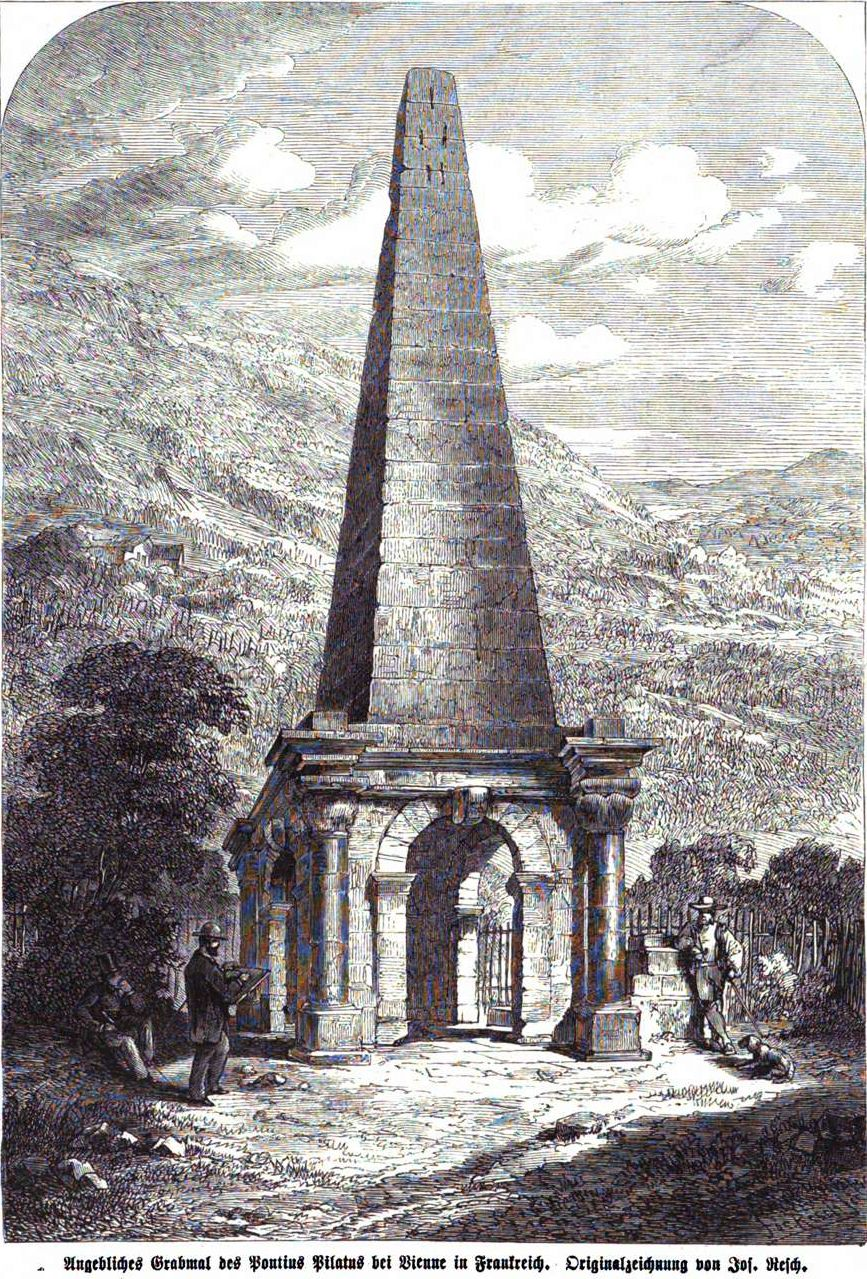
Legend of the pyramid as Pontius Pilate's tomb

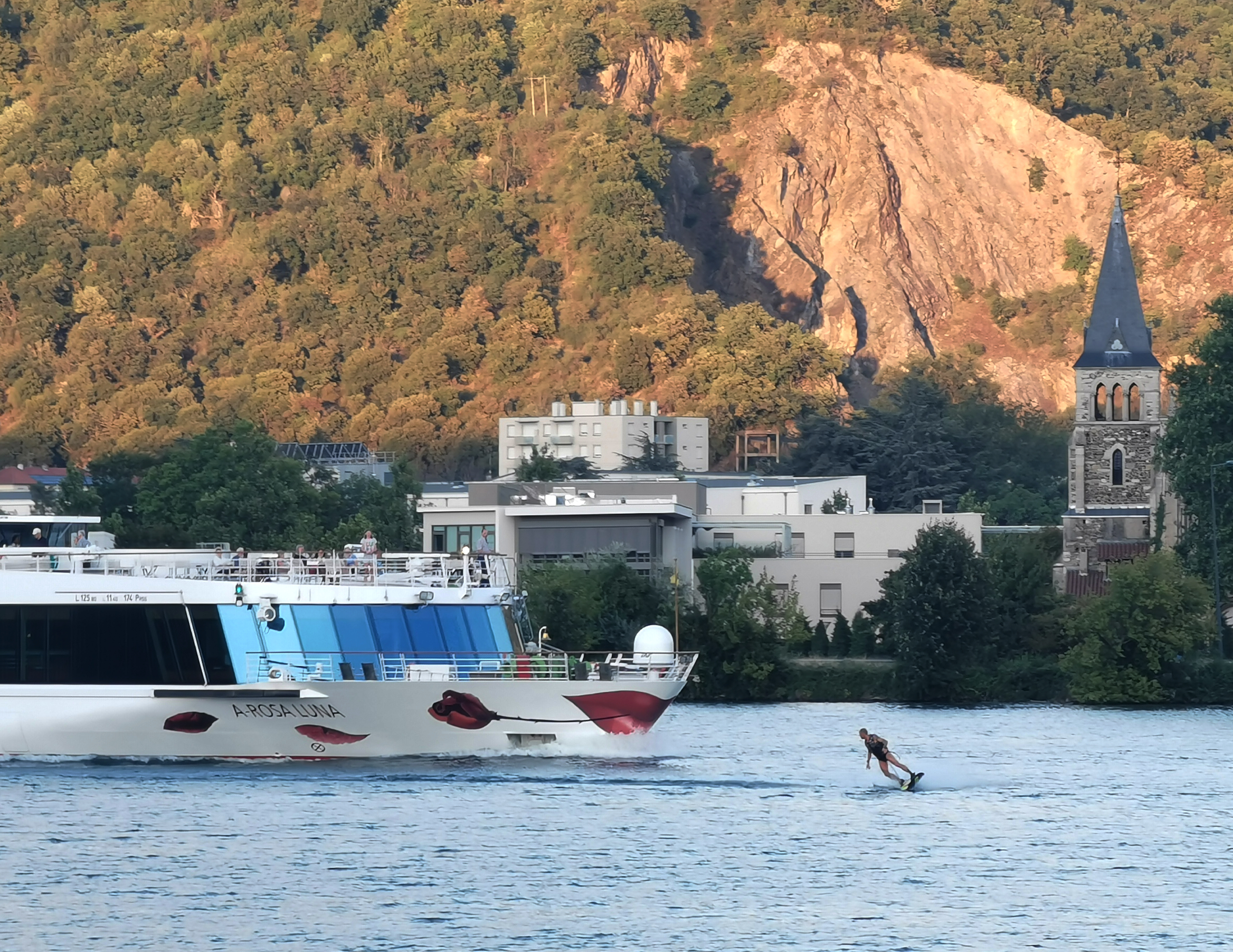
A river cruiser passing Notre Dame de l'Isle (South Vienne)

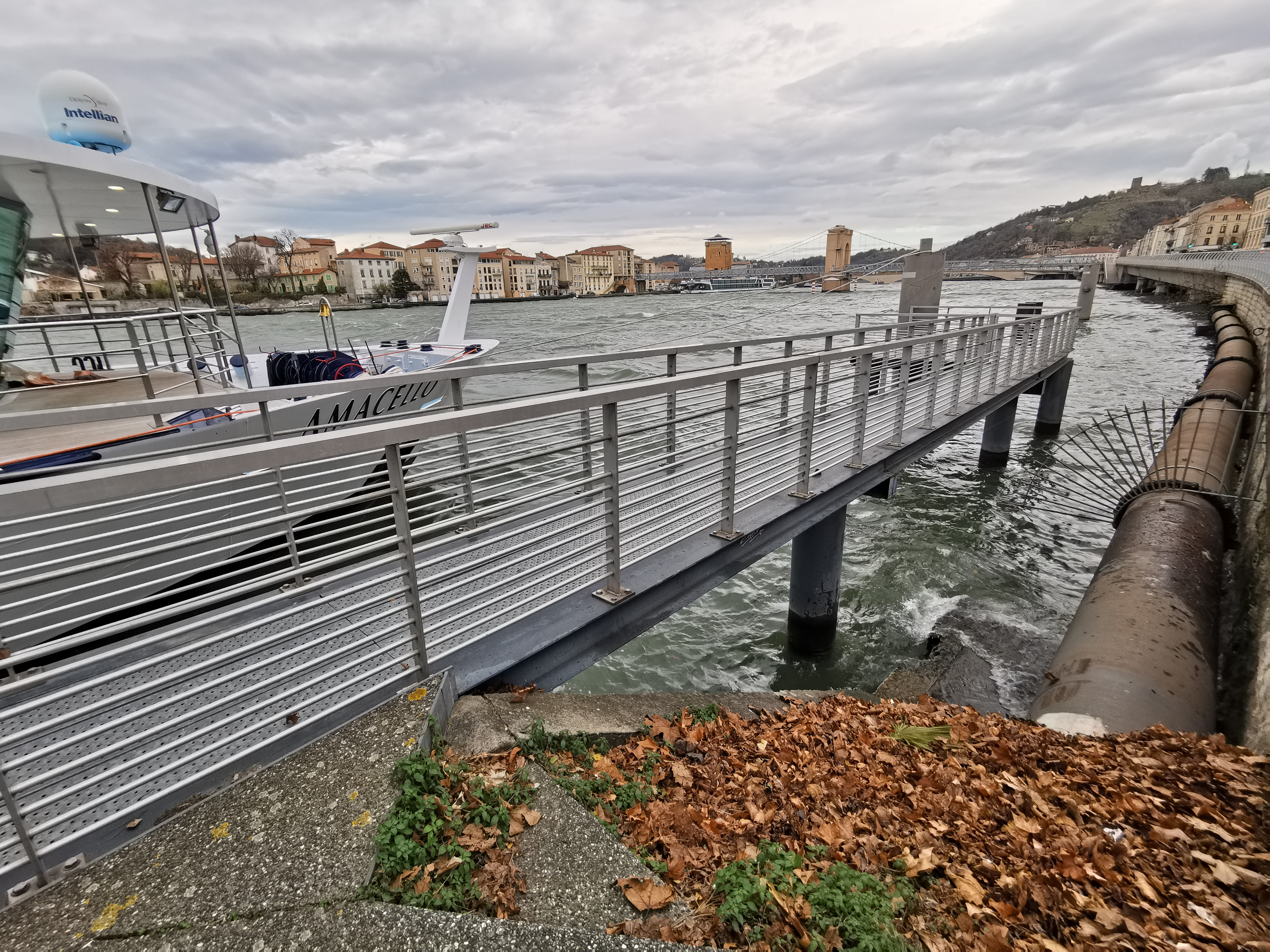
The banks of the river Rhône, in central Vienne

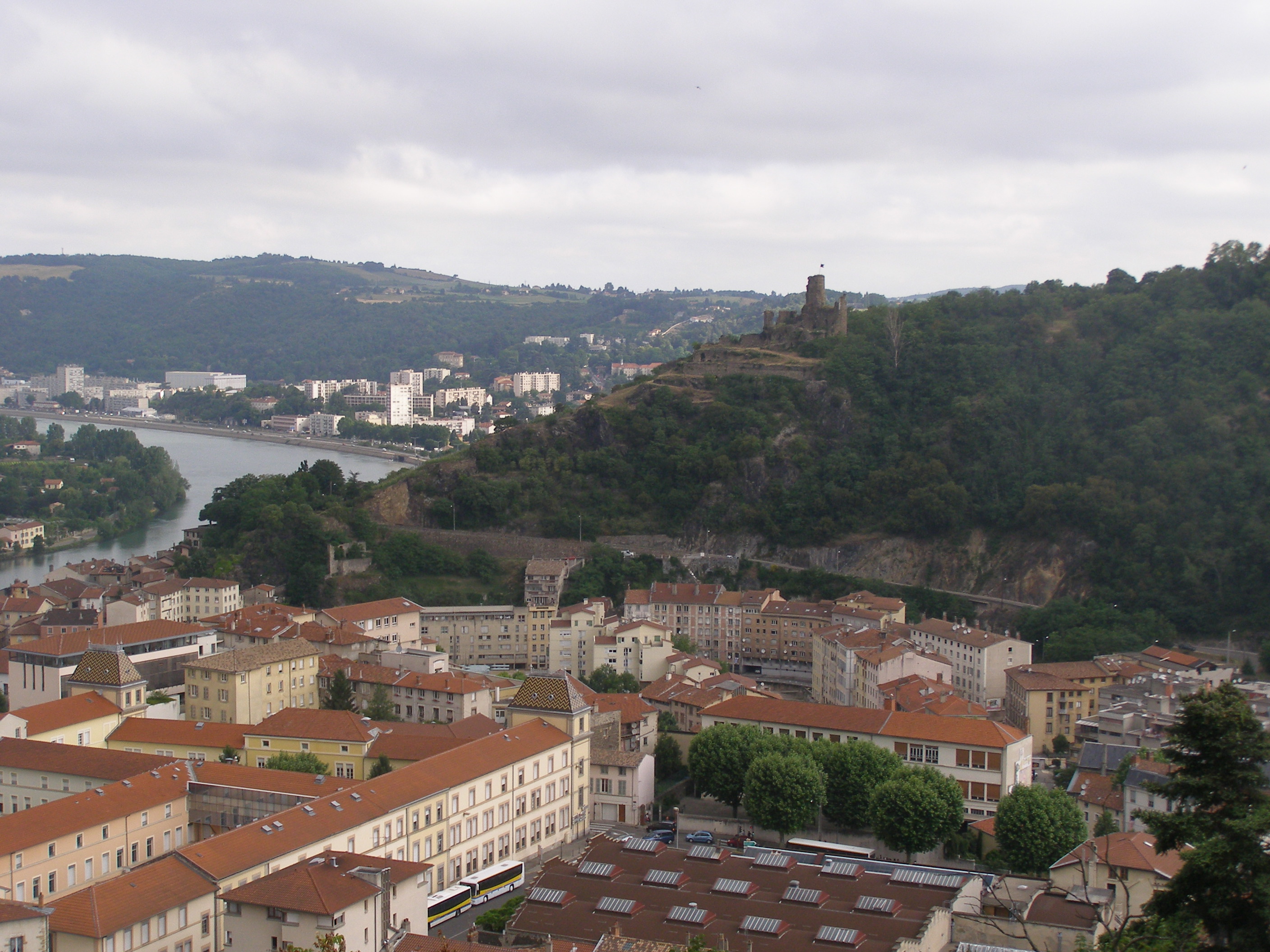
Château de la Batie on Mont Salomon towers over the Rhône and Estressin (north Vienne) with Collège Ponsard in the foreground

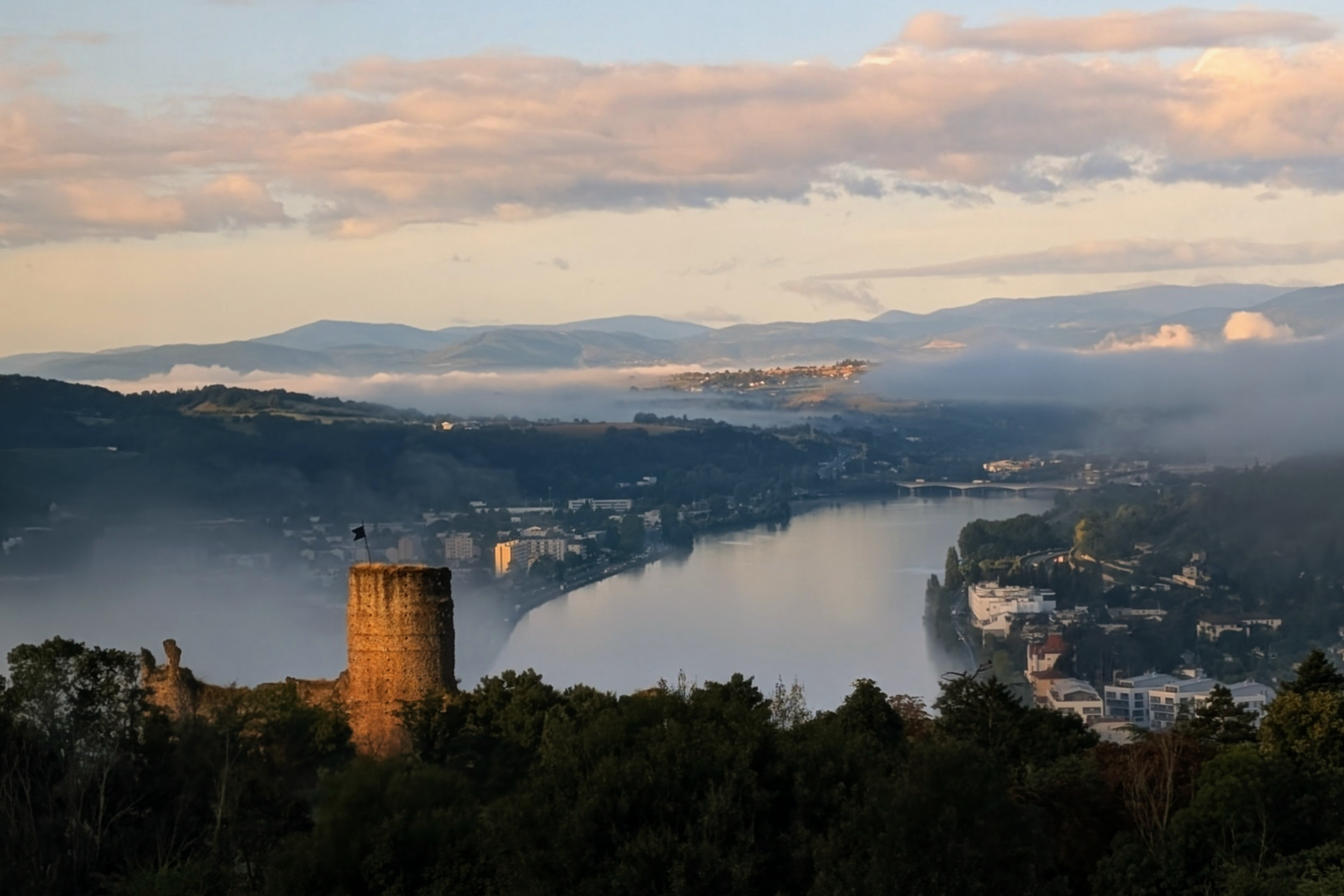
View from Mont Salomon with the Pilat massif in the background (Sainte-Colombe on the right, Vienne (south) on the right, the medieval castle in the foreground)

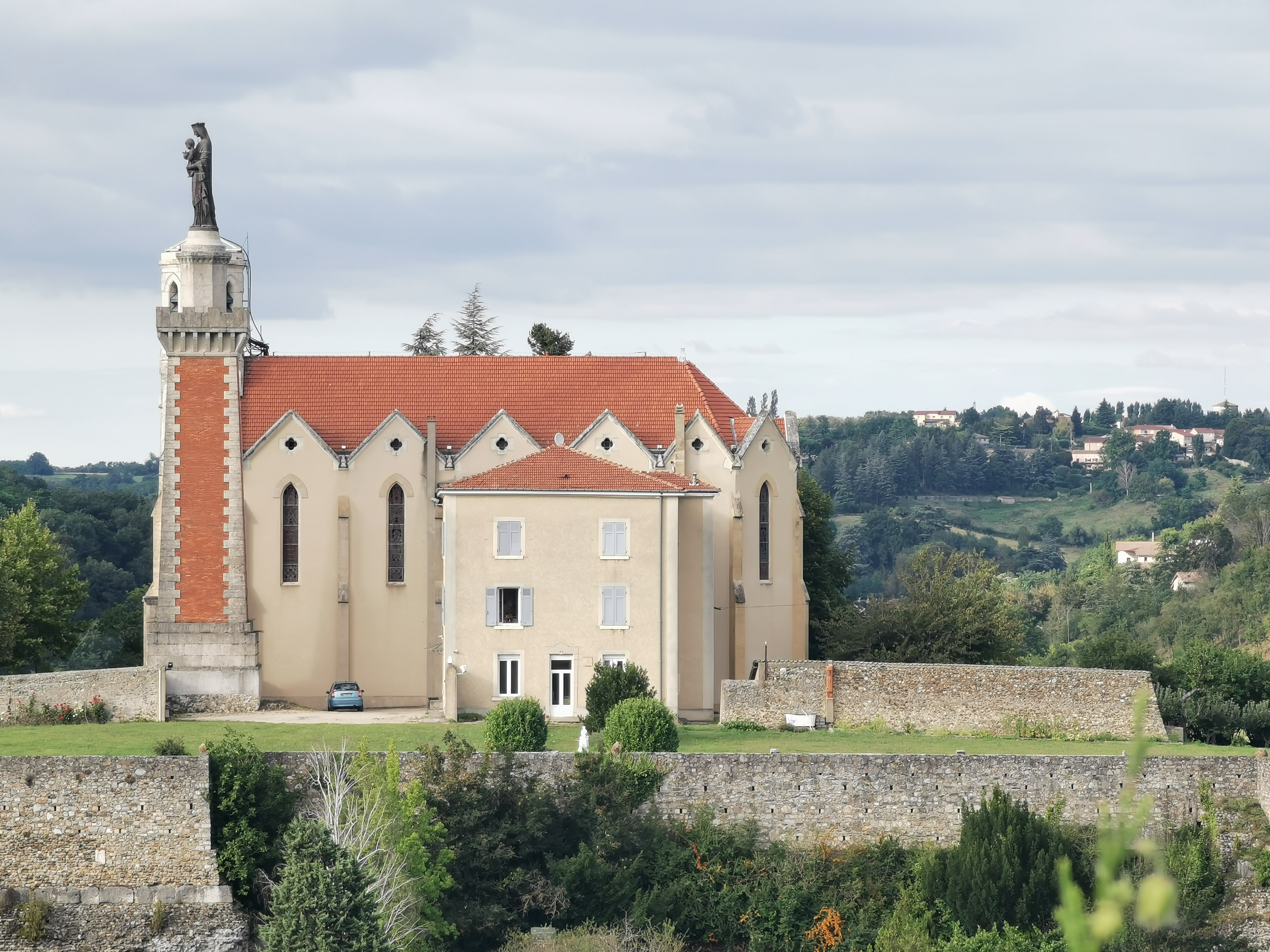
Chapelle Notre-Dame-de-la-Salette de Pipet

== Notable people ==
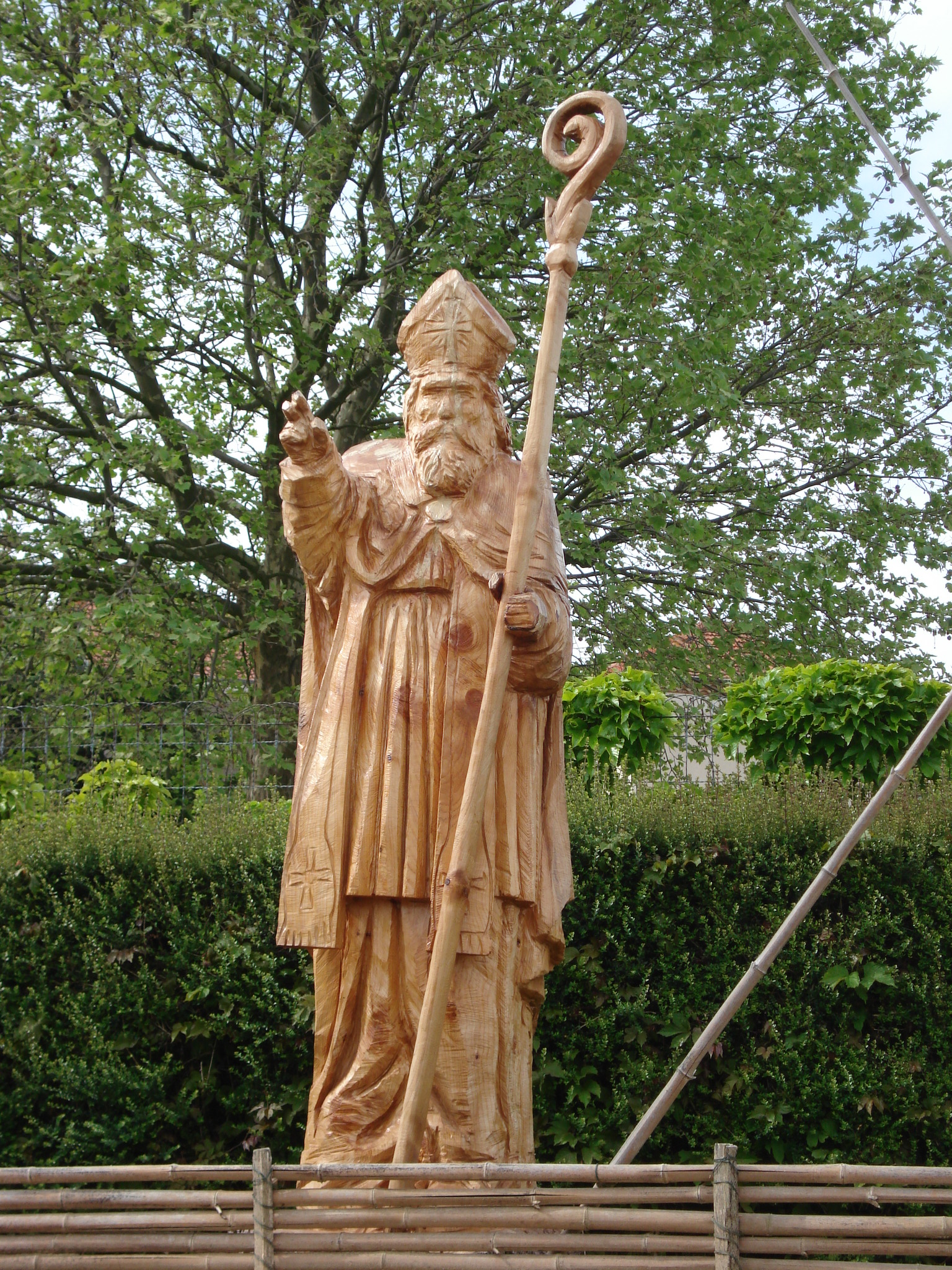
Sculpture of St. Avitus of Vienne

- Herod Archelaus (23 BC–c. 18 AD), ethnarch
- Pontius Pilate (according to legend)
- Avitus of Vienne (450–c. 578), poet, bishop of Vienne, and saint
- Saint Clair du Dauphiné (c. 590–660)
- Boso of Provence, (c. 841–887), Carolingian king of Provence
- Pope Callixtus II (1065–1124), Archbishop of Vienne from 1088, Pope from 1119
- Michael Servetus (1509–1553), savant, burned as a heretic
- Nicolas Chorier (1612–1692), lawyer, historian, author
- Jean-François Leriget de La Faye (1674–1731), diplomat, wealthy landowner, art collector, and poet
- Pierre Schneyder (1733–1814), archeologist, artist, curator
- Jean-Baptiste-Charles Chabroud (1750–1816), lawyer and politician
- Laurent Mourguet (1769–1884), puppeteer
- François Ponsard (1814–1867), dramatist, poet, and author
- Joseph Martin (explorer) (1848–1892), geologist, topographer, and explorer of Eastern Siberia
- Louis Vialleton (1859–1929), zoologist and writer
- Fernand Point (1897–1955), chef
- Christophe Pourny (born 1962), antique restorer, and conservator

== Twin towns – sister cities ==
Vienne is twinned with:

- Albacete, Spain
- Esslingen am Neckar, Germany
- Greenwich, Connecticut, United States
- Goris, Armenia
- Neath Port Talbot, Wales, United Kingdom
- Piotrków Trybunalski, Poland
- Schiedam, Netherlands
- Udine, Italy
- Velenje, Slovenia

== Climate ==
Climate data for Vienne, Isère (Reventin-Vaugris), elevation 295 m (968 ft), (2004–2020 normals, extremes 2004–present)
Month	Jan	Feb	Mar	Apr	May	Jun	Jul	Aug	Sep	Oct	Nov	Dec	Year
Record high °C (°F)	17.9 (64.2)	21.2 (70.2)	25.2 (77.4)	28.7 (83.7)	33.6 (92.5)	38.3 (100.9)	40.0 (104.0)	41.2 (106.2)	34.2 (93.6)	29.4 (84.9)	21.0 (69.8)	18.2 (64.8)	41.2 (106.2)
Mean daily maximum °C (°F)	6.7 (44.1)	8.6 (47.5)	13.4 (56.1)	18.1 (64.6)	21.4 (70.5)	26.2 (79.2)	28.8 (83.8)	27.7 (81.9)	23.5 (74.3)	17.8 (64.0)	11.2 (52.2)	7.1 (44.8)	17.5 (63.5)
Daily mean °C (°F)	4.0 (39.2)	4.9 (40.8)	8.7 (47.7)	12.7 (54.9)	15.9 (60.6)	20.3 (68.5)	22.6 (72.7)	21.7 (71.1)	18.1 (64.6)	13.7 (56.7)	8.2 (46.8)	4.4 (39.9)	12.9 (55.2)
Mean daily minimum °C (°F)	1.2 (34.2)	1.3 (34.3)	4.0 (39.2)	7.4 (45.3)	10.5 (50.9)	14.4 (57.9)	16.4 (61.5)	15.7 (60.3)	12.7 (54.9)	9.6 (49.3)	5.2 (41.4)	1.8 (35.2)	8.3 (46.9)
Record low °C (°F)	−8.1 (17.4)	−11.8 (10.8)	−9.3 (15.3)	−3.3 (26.1)	2.6 (36.7)	6.0 (42.8)	9.8 (49.6)	9.0 (48.2)	2.0 (35.6)	−2.0 (28.4)	−5.7 (21.7)	−11.1 (12.0)	−11.8 (10.8)
Average precipitation mm (inches)	51.7 (2.04)	44.7 (1.76)	46.4 (1.83)	64.8 (2.55)	76.9 (3.03)	59.8 (2.35)	62.6 (2.46)	66.7 (2.63)	62.4 (2.46)	94.5 (3.72)	91.3 (3.59)	53.9 (2.12)	775.7 (30.54)
Average precipitation days (≥ 1.0 mm)	8.4	7.4	8.8	7.3	9.5	8.0	6.9	6.9	6.1	7.9	8.6	8.9	94.7
Source: Meteociel

== Cited works ==
- Cavard, Pierre (1950). La Réforme et les guerres de religions à Vienne [The Reformation and the Wars of Religion in Vienne] (in French). Vienne: Blanchard frères.
- Cavard, Pierre (1953). Le Procès de Michel Servet à Vienne [The Trial of Michaelus Servetus in Vienne] (in French). Vienne: Blanchard frères.
- Cavard, Pierre (1976). Vienne la sainte [Vienne the Holy] (in French). Vienne: Blanchard frères.
- Kibler, William W.; Zinn, Grover A., eds. (2016) [1995]. Medieval France: An Encyclopedia. New York and London: Routledge. ISBN 978-1-351-66566-7.
