= Hôtel de Ville, Vienne, Isère =

Town hall in Vienne, Isère, France

Hôtel de Ville
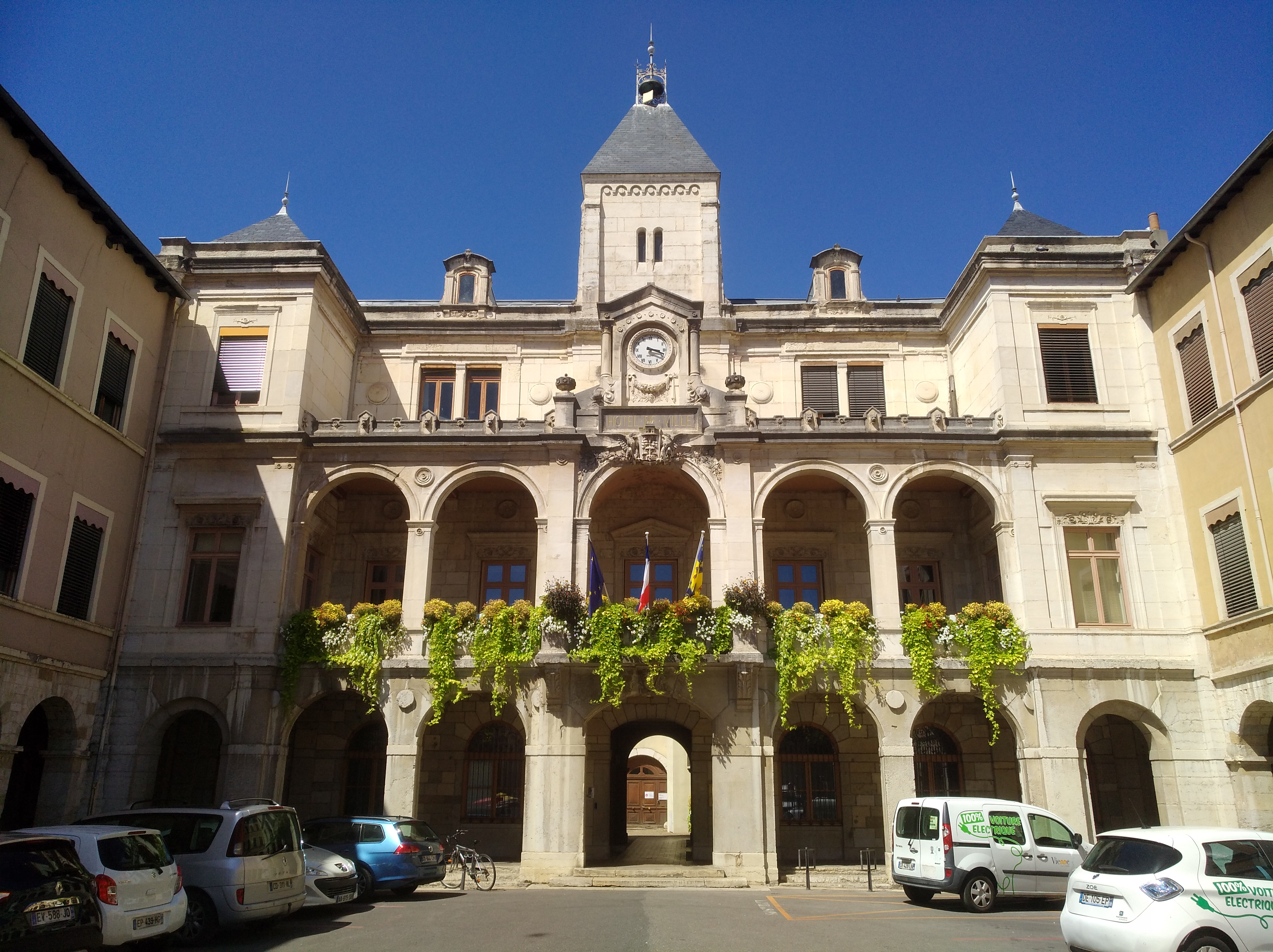
- The main frontage of the Hôtel de Ville in August 2020
- Interactive map of the Hôtel de Ville area

General information
- Type: City hall
- Architectural style: Neoclassical style
- Location: Vienne, Isère, France
- Coordinates: 45.5262°N 4.8753°E
- Completed: c.1690

The Hôtel de Ville (French pronunciation: [otɛl də vil], City Hall) is a municipal building in Vienne, Isère in southeastern France, standing on Place François Mitterrand.

== History ==
The first town hall in Vienne was the Maison de la Chaîne at the corner of Rue des Clercs and Rue de la Chaîne which the consuls acquired in 1471. The consuls then relocated to the Palais des Canaux on what is now Rue Chantelouve in the 16th century. This building had served as the residence of the Kings of Burgundy since the Middle Ages. After it was no longer required for municipal use, the palace was demolished to make way for the Théâtre Municipal in 1782.

In the mid-18th century, the consuls decided to buy a more substantial property. The building they selected was the Hôtel de Rachais. The purchase price, which was financed by public subscription, was 25,000 livres. The building had been commissioned as a private residence, probably by Sébastien de Rachais, in around 1690. It remained in the Rachais family until Hugues, Marquis de Rachais agreed to sell it to the consuls in 1771.

The building was laid out as a Hôtel particulier around a courtyard. The original entrance was on Rue Marchande: this changed with the demolition of the Couvent des Augustins (Convent of the Augustinians), which opened up access to Place Neuve (now Place François Mitterrand), in 1802. The design of the main block involved a symmetrical main frontage of seven bays facing onto the courtyard. The building was improved with loggias on the first two floors, the ground-floor loggia being completed in 1808 and the first-floor loggia being completed in 1852. A clock was added together with a square tower behind it, in 1853. Internally, the principal rooms included the Grand Salon, which was decorated with large canvases by Pierre Schneyder, and the Bureau du Maire (Mayor's Parlour) which was decorated in the style of the old masters such as Nicolas Poussin and Sébastien Bourdon.
