= Gère =

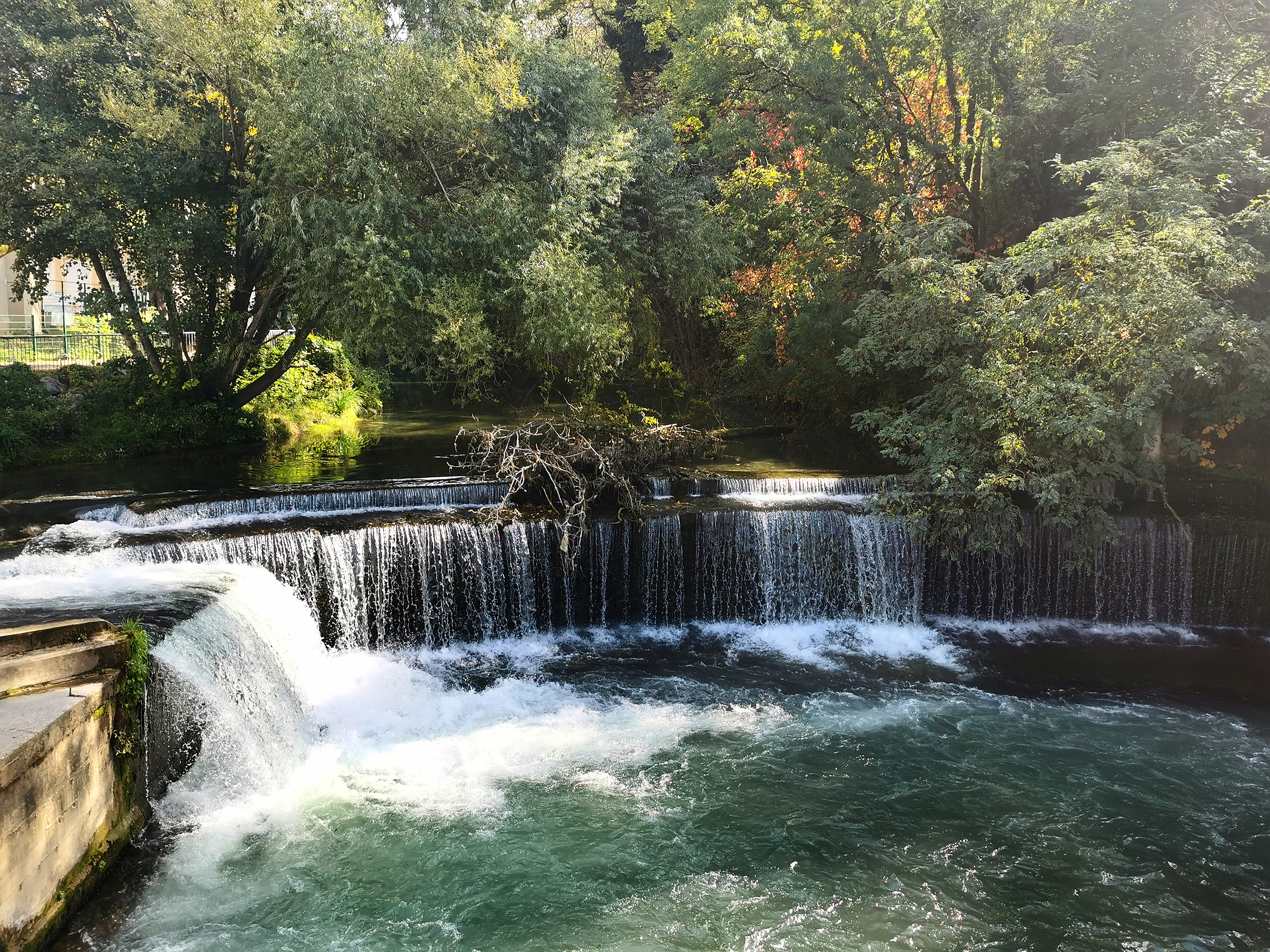
- The Gère in Vienne

- Location within France Location within Auvergne-Rhône-Alpes

Location
- Country: France
- Region: Auvergne-Rhône-Alpes
- Department: Isère
- Towns: Châtonnay; Pont-Évêque; Vienne

Physical characteristics
- Source: Eastern part of the Bonnevaux forest, étang de la Grande Tuilière
  - location: Châtonnay
  - coordinates: 45°27′45″N 5°13′12″E
  - elevation: 549 m
- Mouth: Rhône
  - location: Vienne
  - coordinates: 45°31′40″N 4°52′24″E
  - elevation: 152 m
- Length: 34.5 km (21.4 mi)
- Discharge
  - average: 3.15 cubic metres per second (111 cu ft/s)

Basin features
- Progression: Rhône→ Mediterranean Sea

The Gère (French pronunciation: [ʒɛʁ]) is a 34.5-kilometre-long (21.4 mi) tributary of the Rhône in the Isère department of Auvergne-Rhône-Alpes (France). Its source is in a pond of the Grand Tuilière in the eastern part of the Bonnevaux forest. It flows into the Rhone at Vienne. Its power was put to work for paper mills, foundries, and textile mills in the Gère Valley at the beginning of the industrial era.

== Gallery ==
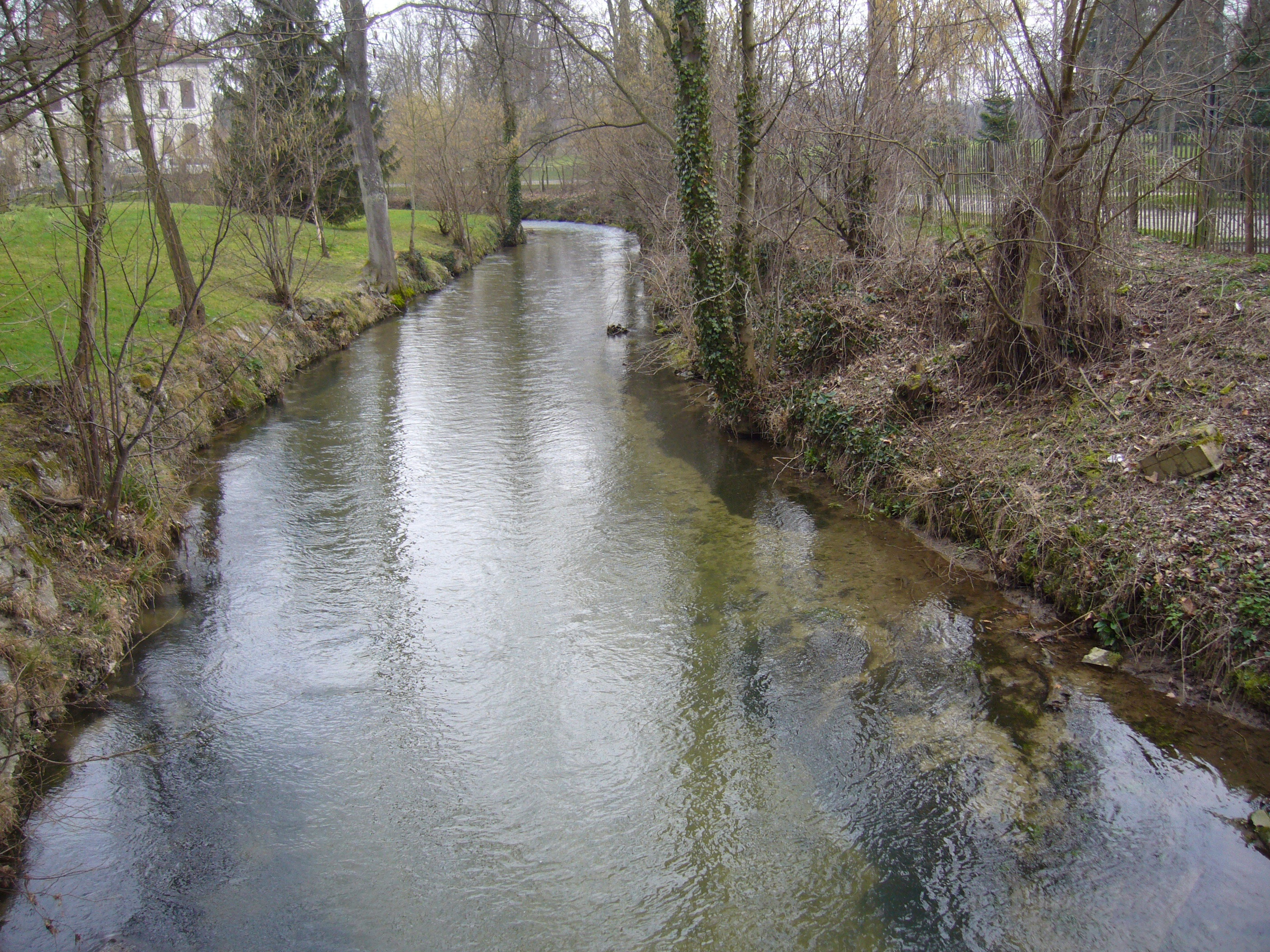
The Gère in Estrablin

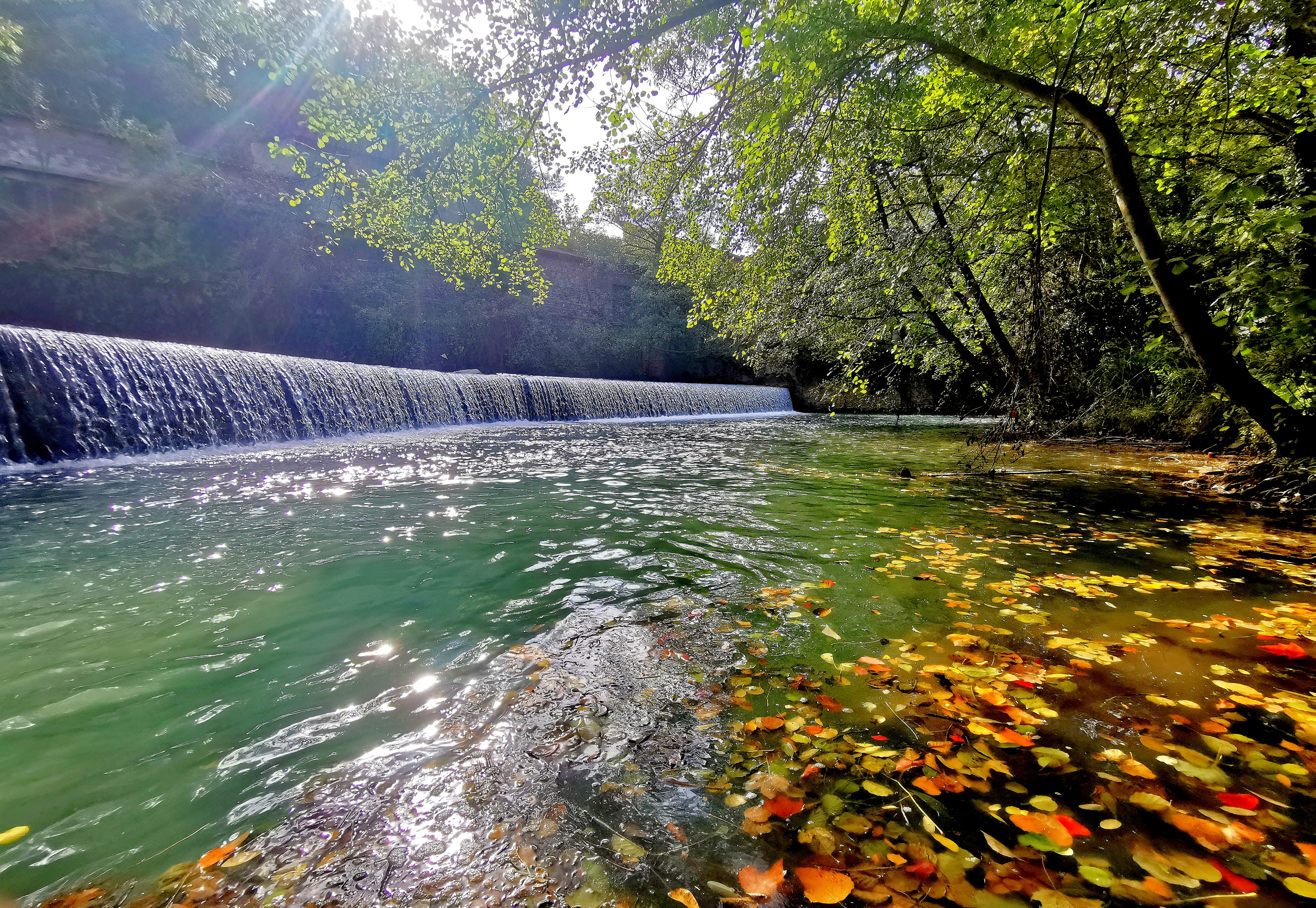
Weir in the Gère Valley (Vienne)

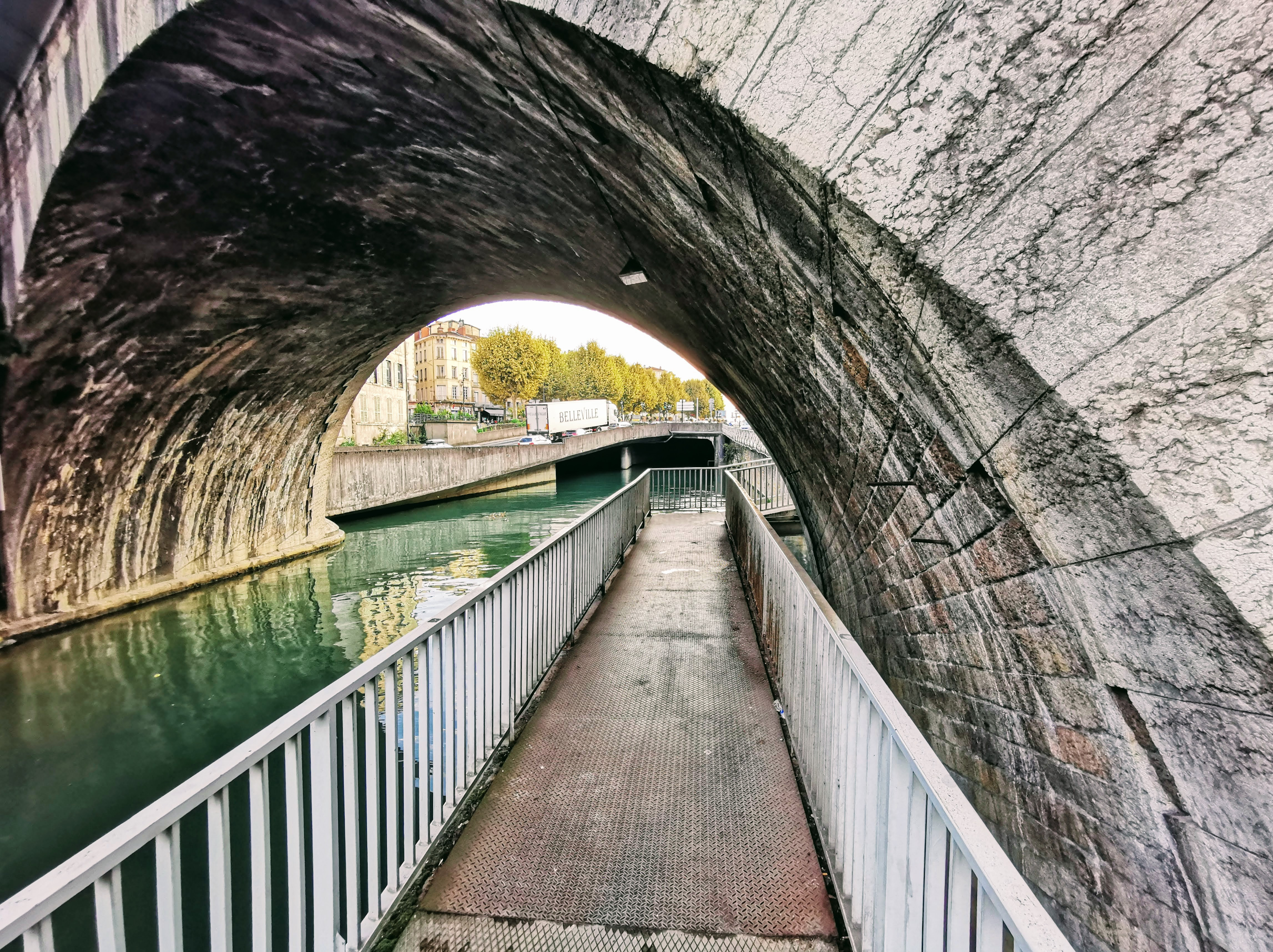
Railway bridge near the confluence with the Rhône

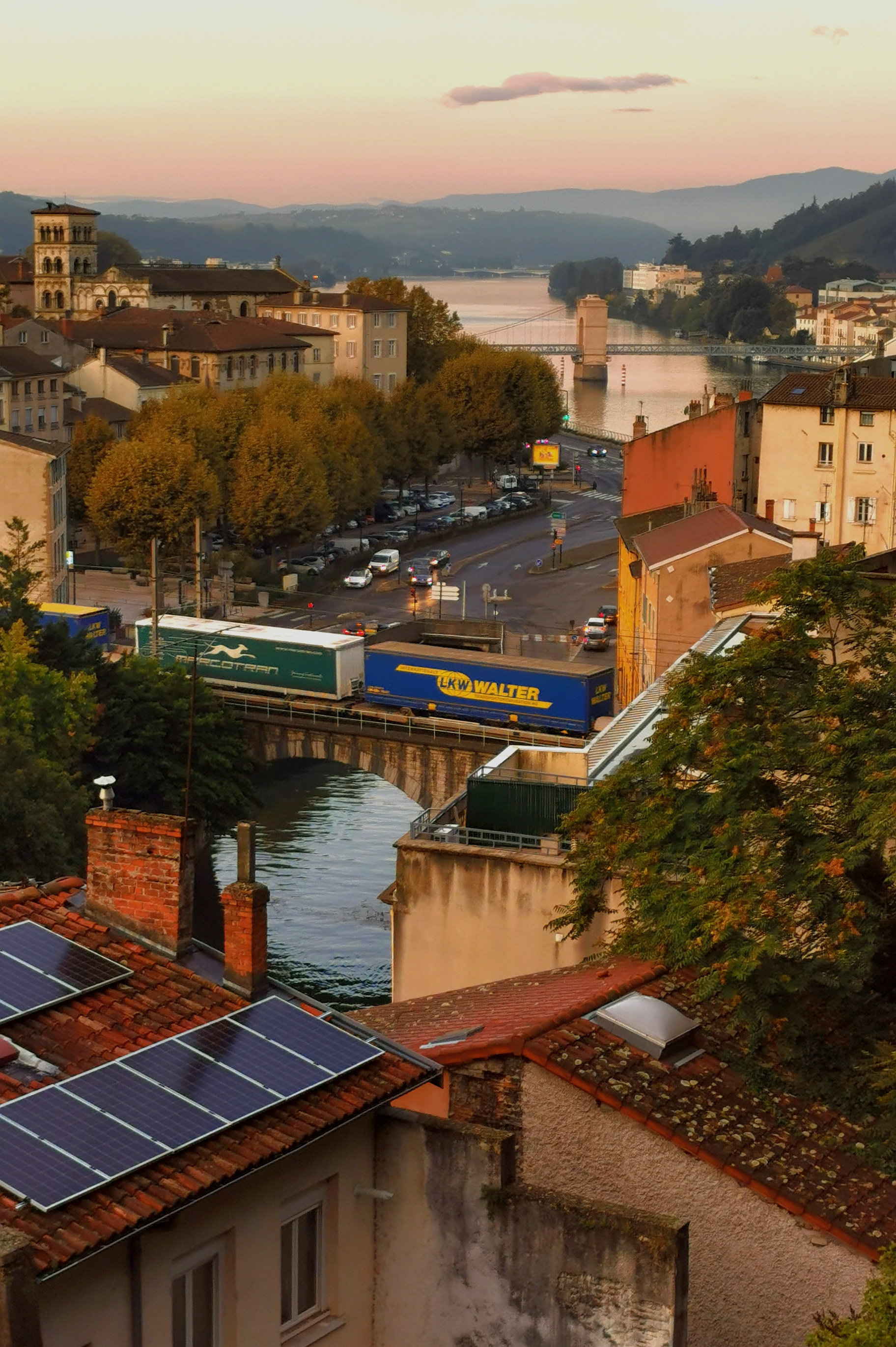
The Gère-Rhône confluence
