= Christophe Pourny =

Antique restorer and conservator

- Born: June 22, 1962 (age 64); Vienne, France
- Education: University of Nice
- Occupation: Antiques conservation

Christophe Pourny (born June 22, 1962) is an antique restorer and conservator, published author, entrepreneur and public personality. His clientele includes museums, The City of New York, Personalities from the world of entertainment, politics and finance as well as some of the most renowned interior designers. His work is regularly featured in national and international press.

== Early life ==
Christophe was born in France, the oldest of three children. When his father, a French military officer with a long career in colonial-then-independent Algeria, and his mother decided to make a radical life change, they became antique dealers. They moved to the south of France, to Fayence in the Var region, a small village, and opened their Antique Shop. Christophe grew up immersed in the world of antiques and furniture and after some classic and humanist studies in Nice in the Classes Preparatoires aux Grandes Ecoles and at the University of Nice, he moved to Paris to apprentice under the guidance of his great-uncle, Pierre Madel, whose shop Rue Jacob, was the oldest one on the block with Madeleine Castaing. A few years later Christophe moved to New York, elected the US as his new home and became an American citizen.

== Career ==
From a few of his parents’ clients in New York, Christophe started to build a clientele. He eventually met Amy Perlin and became her shop manager and advisor as she started her business. The renowned Designer John Saladino, a client of the gallery, would later discover Christophe’s amazing ability to recreate old period finishes and gave him his big break. Since then clients have included Mayor Bloomberg, the City of New York, The Holy see mission, famous personalities and designers as renowned as David Kleinberg, Bunny Williams and Benjamin Noriega Ortiz. Christophe is quoted to say: "I have my entrance to each and every building on Fifth and Park Avenues; from 9am to 4pm...Service entrance that is!" Martha Stewart came to appreciate Christophe's work for her very well-cared-for personal antiques and furniture. She invited him repeatedly on her TV and Radio Shows for segments on furniture care and maintenance and to showcase artisanal techniques and crafts. Other notable conservation projects include the Gracie Mansion Conservancy, residence of the Mayors of New York, George Washington writing desk and the Council Room wood panelings both in NY City Hall.

== Line of Products ==
Christophe and his partner Jason Jobson created a line of natural wood and leather care products, based on old artisans recipes. The line of products is manufactured in Brooklyn, NY and carried by over a hundred stores nationally and internationally.

== The Furniture Bible ==
The Furniture Bible, written by Christophe, published by Artisan, a division of Workman Publishing Co. came out in 2014. The book subtitle is "Everything You Need To Know To Identify, Restore And Care For Furniture" and describes the content very well. Martha Stewart wrote the foreword:" This is a very useful and important book for anyone who owns furniture-antique, modern or new-or anyone who plans to fix or restore it". The book is rapidly becoming a reference book for amateurs and professionals alike.

== References and links ==
- http://www.chicagotribune.com/lifestyles/home/sc-home-0223-furniture-bible-20150219-story.html
- http://www.marthastewart.com/1072991/christophe-pourny-brooklyn-studio-tour
- http://wwd.com/eye/design/to-the-table-born-8018624
- http://www.designsponge.com/2014/11/scavenging-with-the-furniture-bibles-christophe-pourney.html
- http://www.architecturaldigest.com/blogs/daily/2014/11/the-furniture-bible-christophe-pourny
- http://nymag.com/thecut/2015/01/tour-a-renovated-london-terrace-apartment.html
- http://www.1stdibs.com/introspective-magazine/the-furniture-bible-christophe-pourny/
