= Arzay =

- Part of Porte-des-Bonnevaux
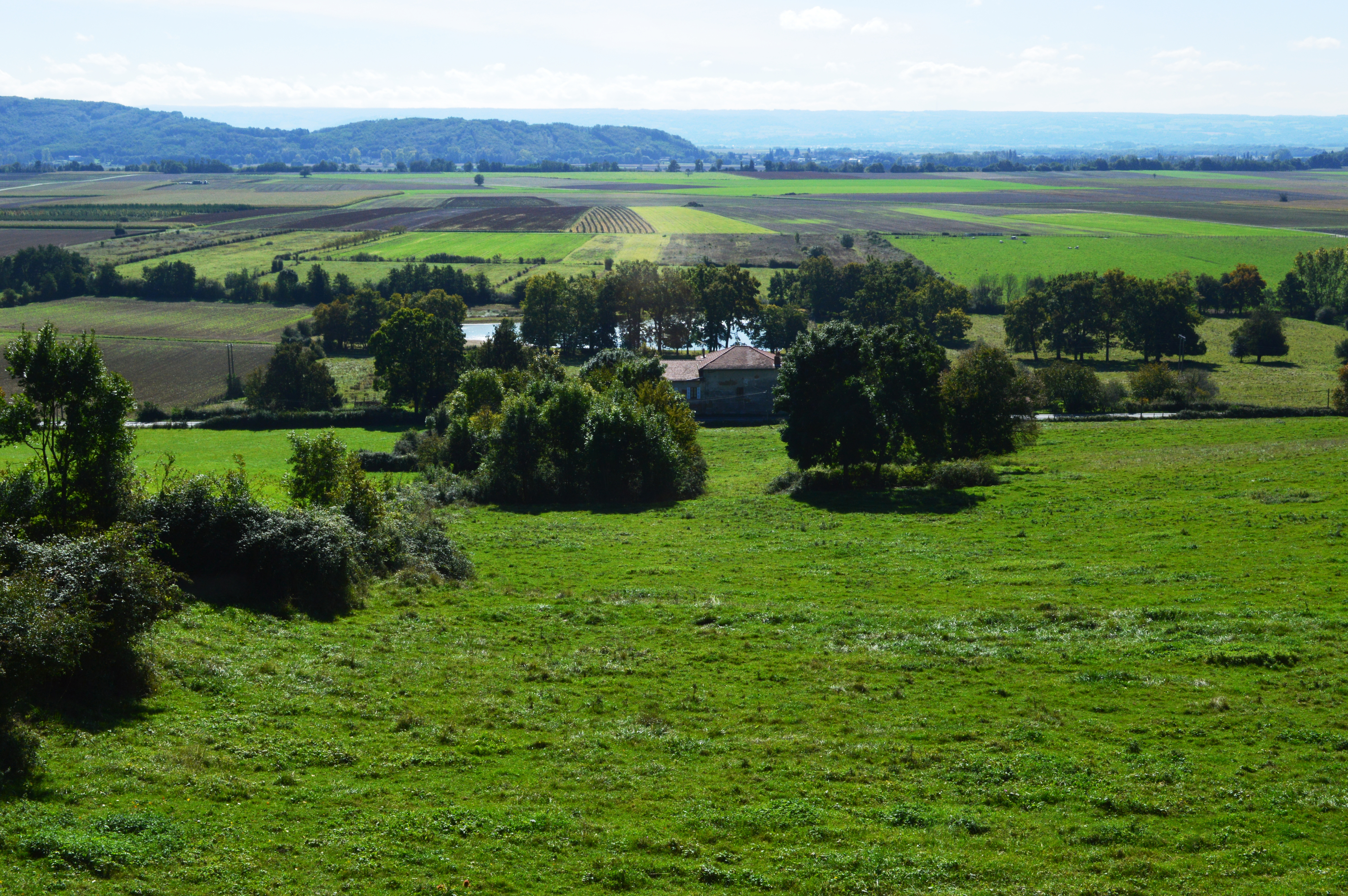
- View from Arzay
- Location of Arzay
- Location within France Location within Auvergne-Rhône-Alpes
- Coordinates: 45°25′35″N 5°10′16″E
- Country: France
- Region: Auvergne-Rhône-Alpes
- Department: Isère
- Arrondissement: Vienne
- Canton: Bièvre
- Commune: Porte-des-Bonnevaux
- Area^{1}: 9.79 km^{2} (3.78 sq mi)
- Highest elevation: 545 m (1,788 ft)
- Lowest elevation: 375 m (1,230 ft)
- Population (2022): 233
  - Density: 23.8/km^{2} (61.6/sq mi)
- Time zone: UTC+01:00 (CET)
  - Summer (DST): UTC+02:00 (CEST)
- Postal code: 38260
- ^{1} French Land Register data, which excludes lakes, ponds, glaciers > 1 km^{2} (0.386 sq mi or 247 acres) and river estuaries.

Arzay (French pronunciation: [aʁzɛ]) is a former commune in the Isère department in the Auvergne-Rhône-Alpes region of south-eastern France. On 1 January 2019, it was merged into the new commune Porte-des-Bonnevaux.

== Geography ==
Arzay is located some 27 km east by south-east of Vienne and 25 km south of Villefontaine. Access to the commune is by the minor D51 road (Route de Beaurepaire) from Pommier-de-Beaurepaire in the south-west passing through the heart of the commune south of the village and continuing to Semons in the east. Access to the village can be by several country roads running off the D51 including the Chemin de la Grande Fontaine, the Chemin de la Croix, or the Chemin de la Diligence. The hilly part of the commune north of the village is heavily forested (part of the Forest of Bonnevaux) while the flat commune south of the village is farmland.

A band of "Étangs" - ponds or lakes - crosses the commune in the north from south-west to north-east. The Étangs within the commune are:

- Étang du Grand Albert,
- Étang Girand,
- Étang Coquet,
- Étang du Grand Massot,
- Étang Girond,
- Étang du Petit Massot,
- Étang de Clos Gabet,
- Étang de la Chapelle,
- Étang Ras,
- Étang Tournier.

The Suzon river flows through the south of the commune from east to west and continues south-west to eventually join the Oron at Beaurepaire. The Grande Vareze flows into the largest of the Étangs in the north - the Étang du Grand Albert.

== Administration ==
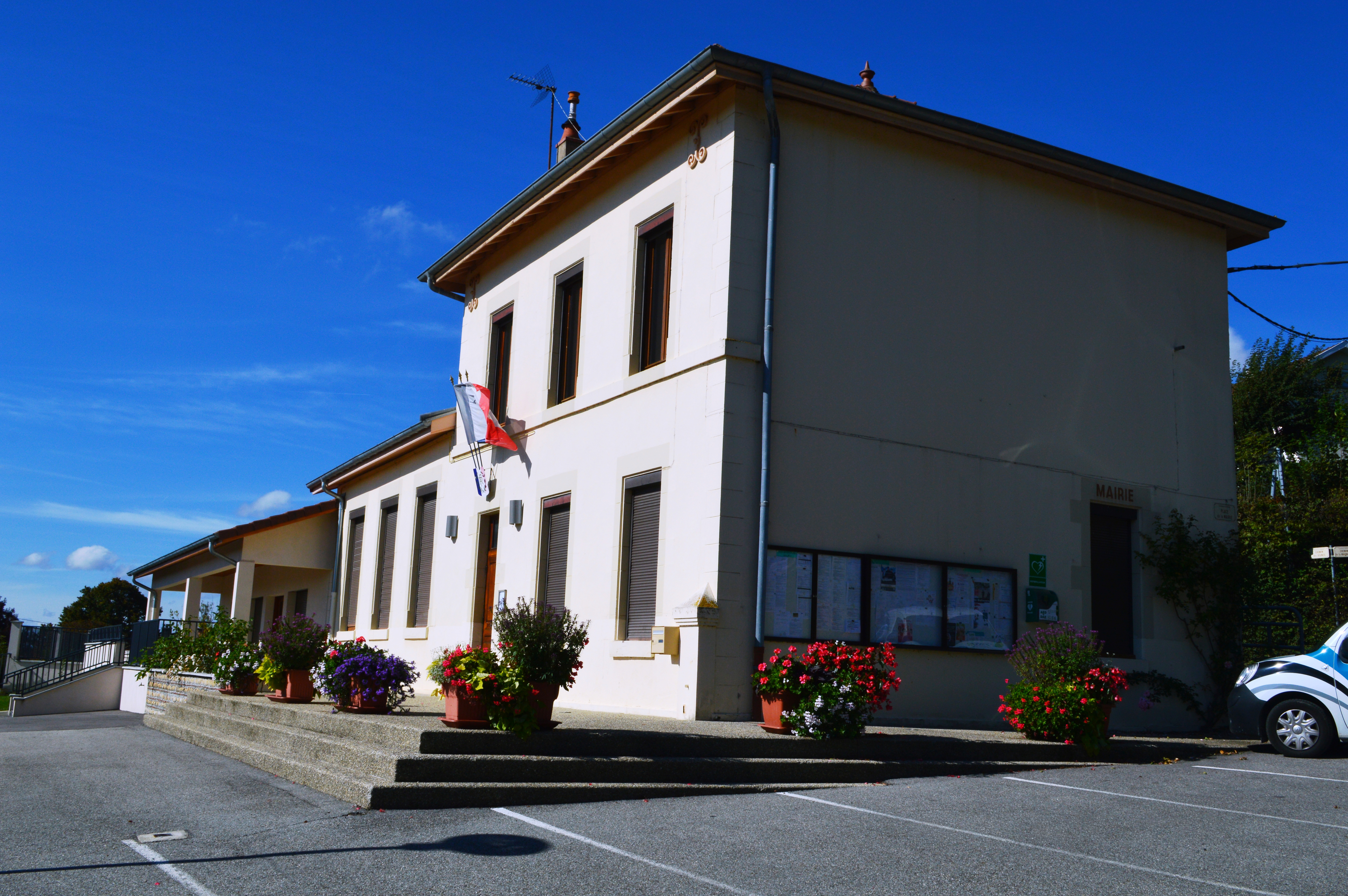
The Town Hall

List of Successive Mayors

From	To	Name
	2002	Jean Chabert
2002	2008	Nicole Reverchon
2008	2014	Élizabeth Virenque
2014	2019	Liliane Térol

== Demography ==
The inhabitants of the commune are known as Arzayaux in French.

Historical population

Year	Pop.	±% p.a.
1793	236	—
1800	254	+1.06%
1806	249	−0.33%
1821	291	+1.04%
1831	287	−0.14%
1836	295	+0.55%
1841	294	−0.07%
1846	306	+0.80%
1851	278	−1.90%
1856	260	−1.33%
1861	274	+1.05%
1866	264	−0.74%
1872	291	+1.64%
1876	269	−1.95%
1881	266	−0.22%
1886	243	−1.79%
1891	209	−2.97%
1896	176	−3.38%

Year	Pop.	±% p.a.
1901	191	+1.65%
1906	190	−0.10%
1911	180	−1.08%
1921	203	+1.21%
1926	200	−0.30%
1931	167	−3.54%
1936	143	−3.06%
1946	135	−0.57%
1954	121	−1.36%
1962	129	+0.80%
1968	125	−0.52%
1975	108	−2.07%
1982	142	+3.99%
1990	166	+1.97%
1999	169	+0.20%
2007	210	+2.75%
2012	216	+0.57%
2022	233	+0.76%

Source: EHESS and INSEE

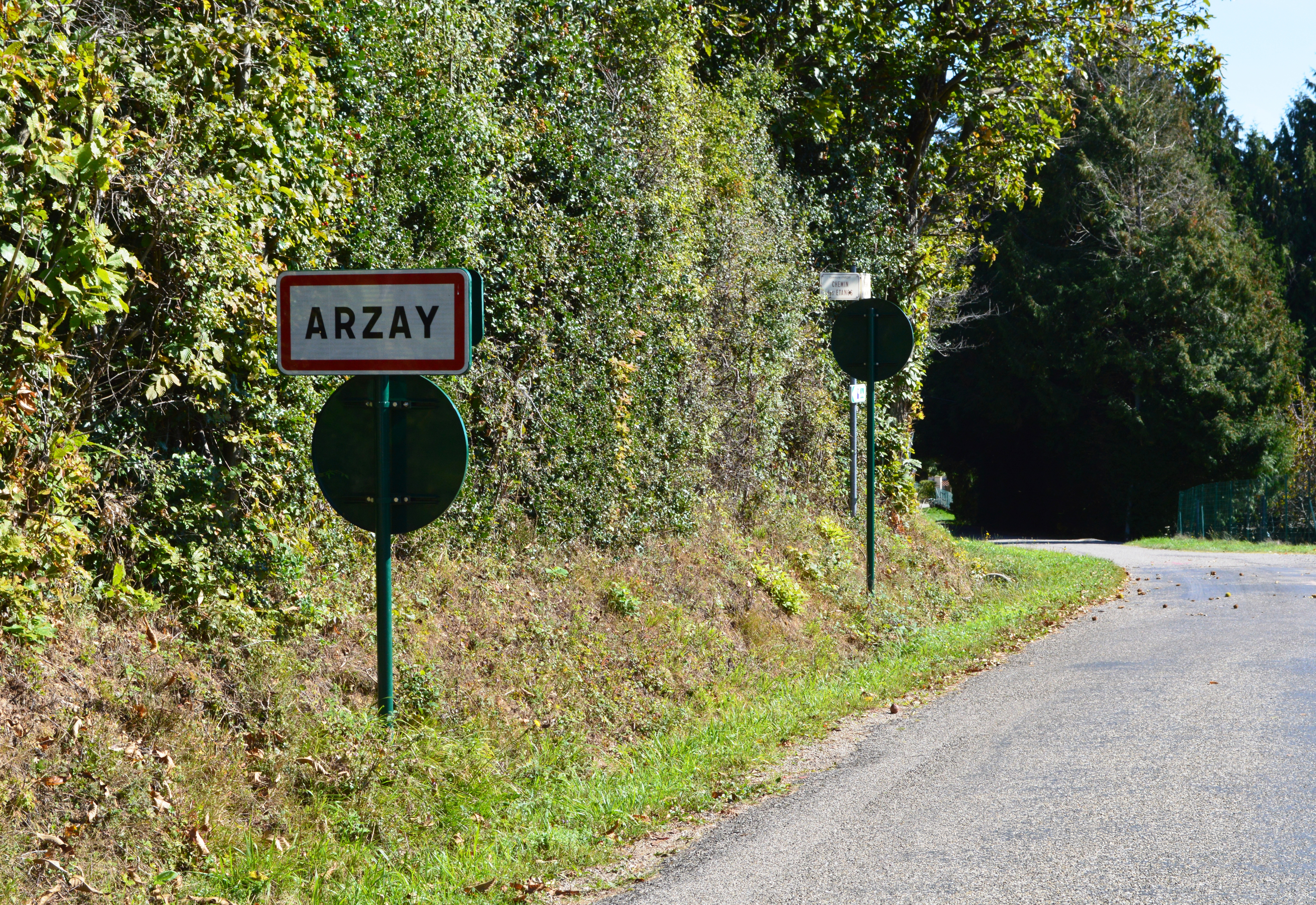
The entry to Arzay

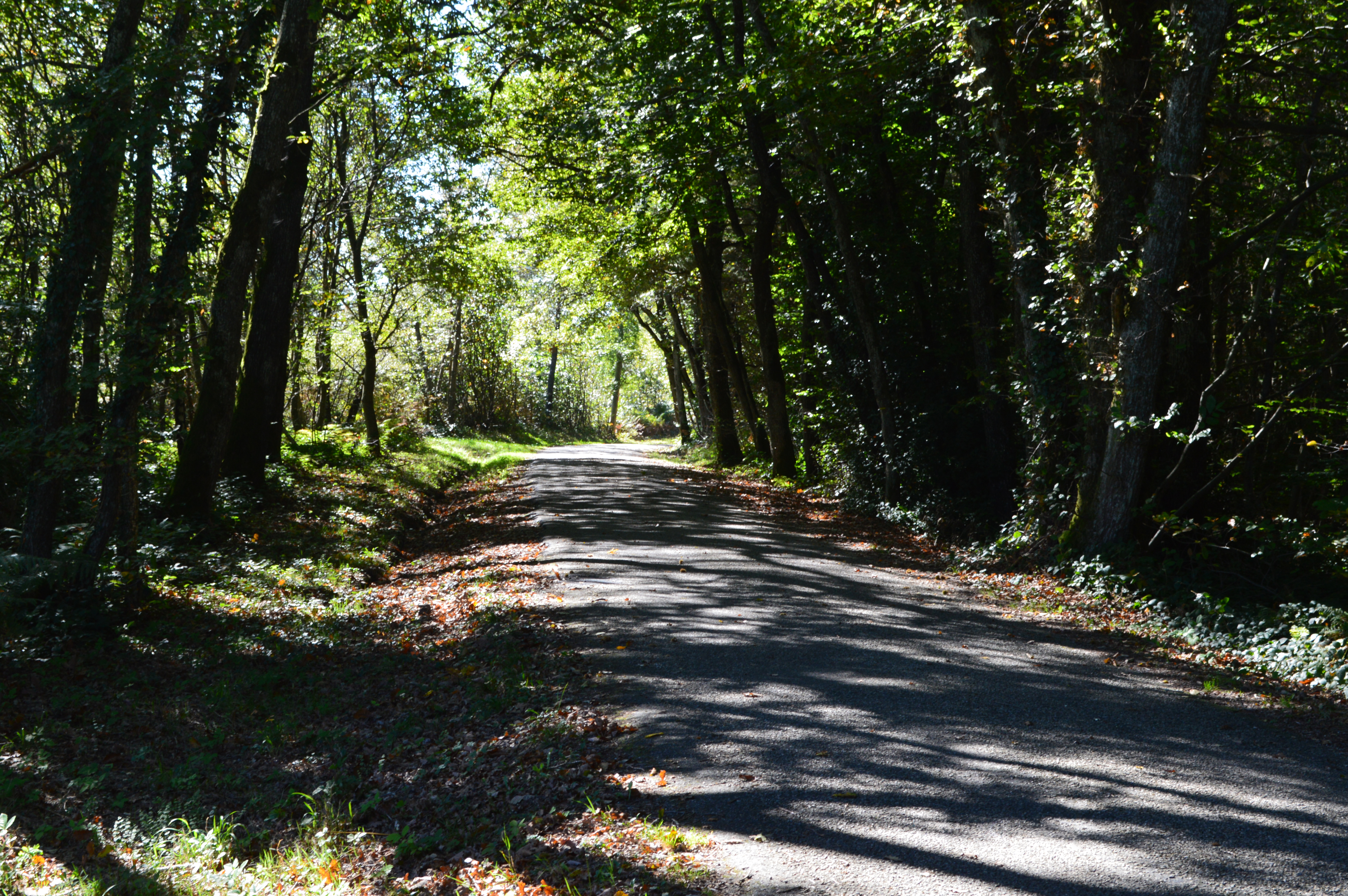
A road in Arzay

== Sites and monuments ==
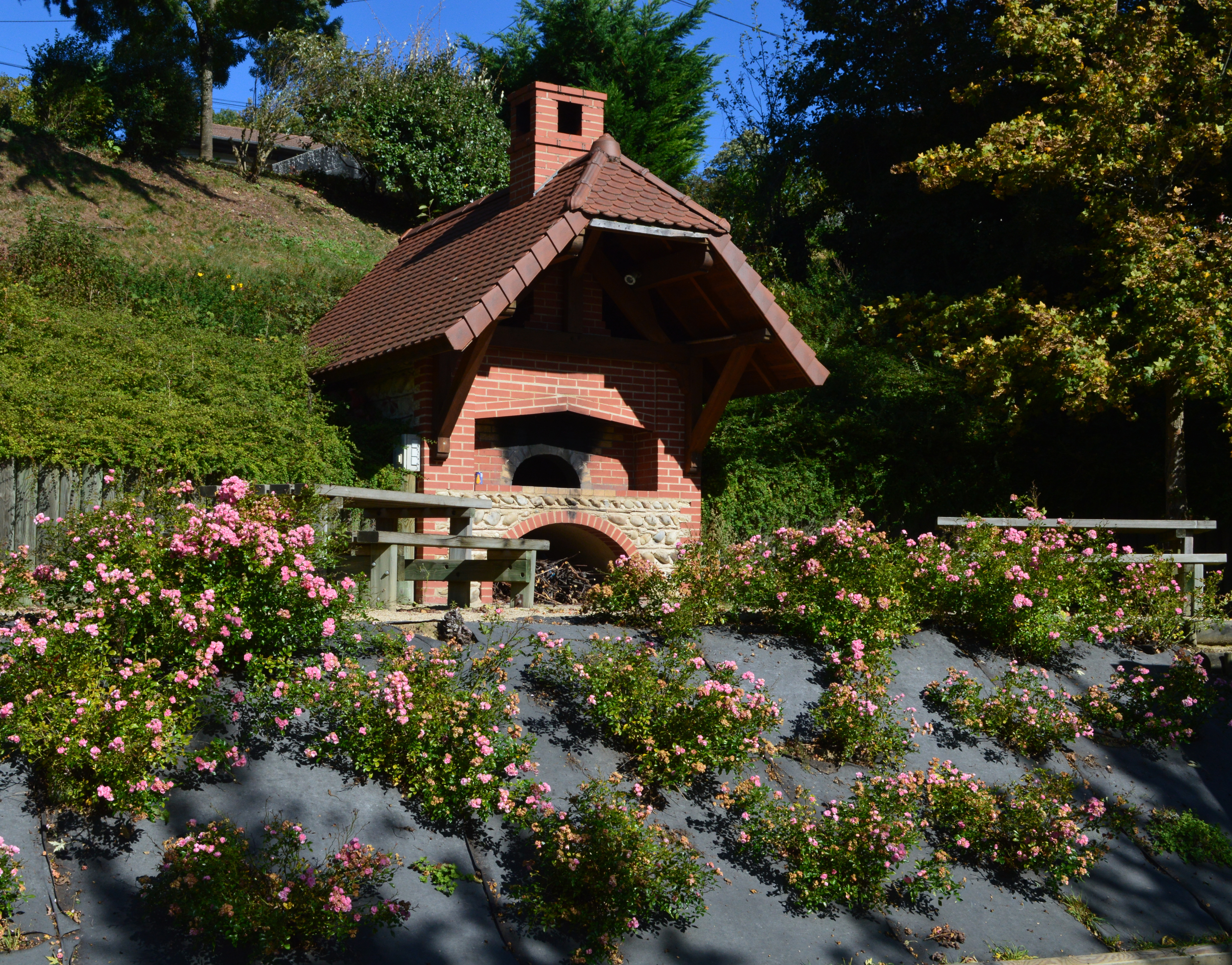
The Communal Bread Oven

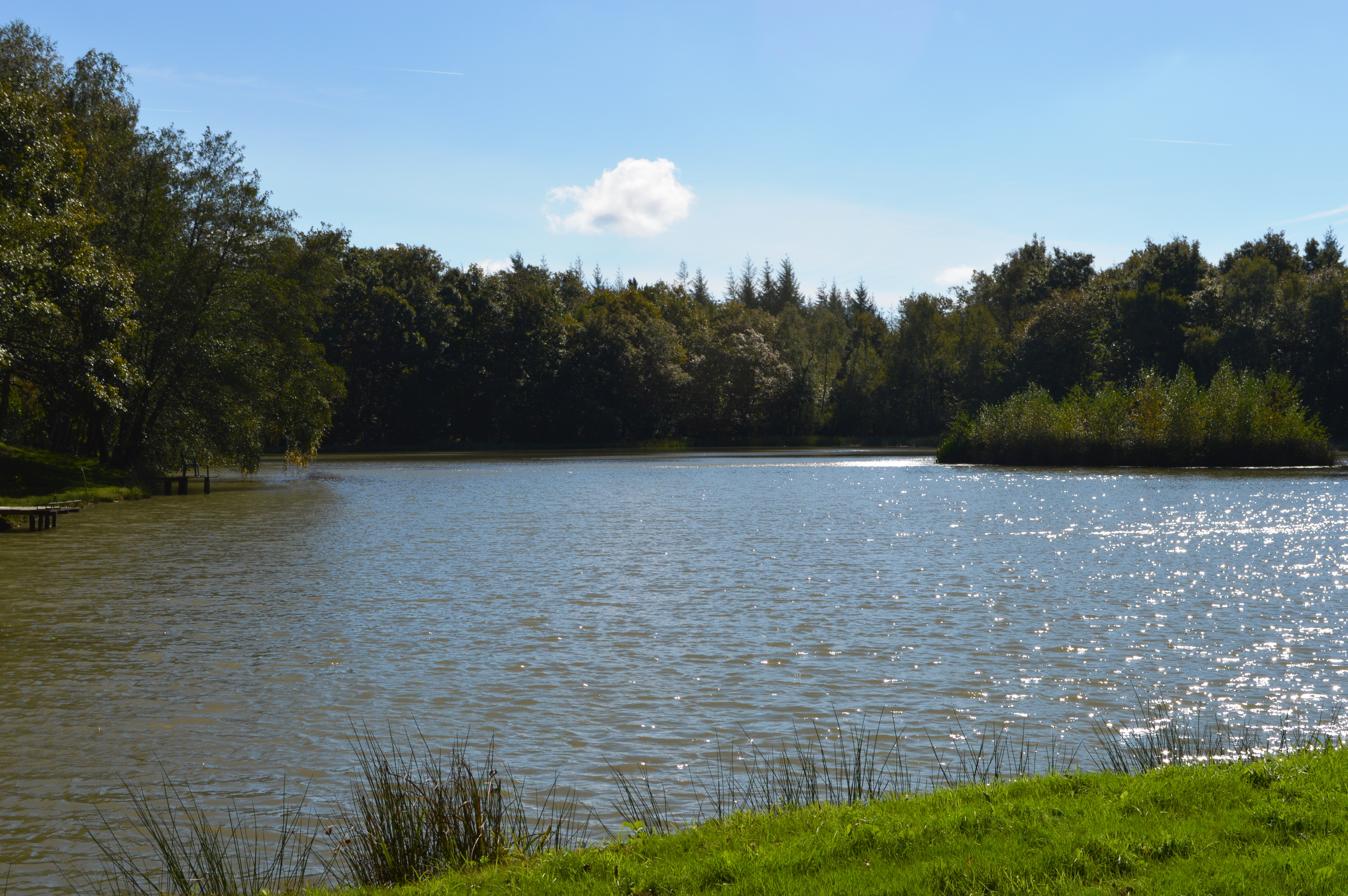
The Étang du Grand Albert

- The Chateau d'Arzay from the 19th century (chapel)
- A Bread oven in the Place Jean Chabert (next to the church)
- Numerous Étangs with the Étang du Grand Albert the most well known (private access)

=== Church Picture Gallery ===
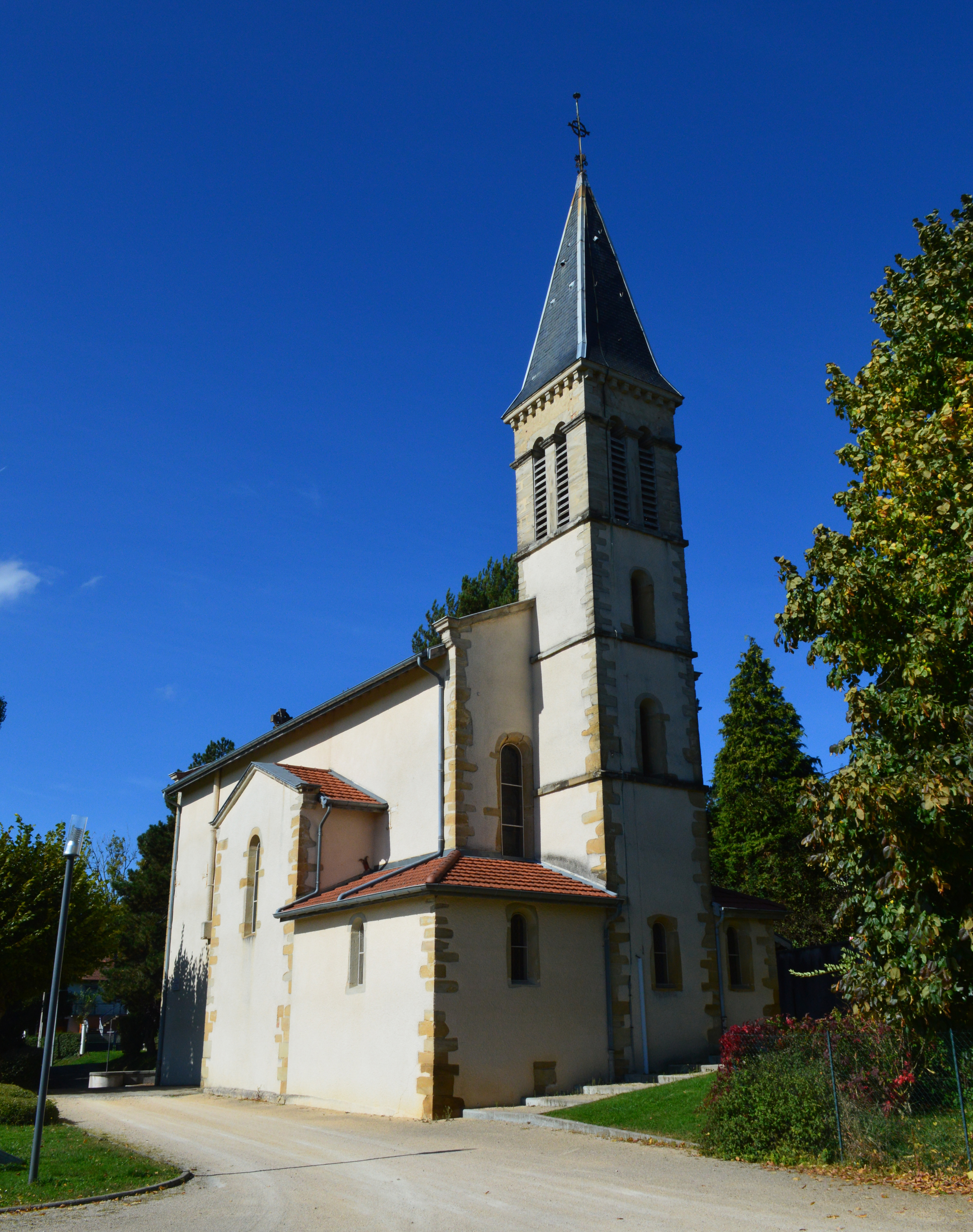
Arzay Church

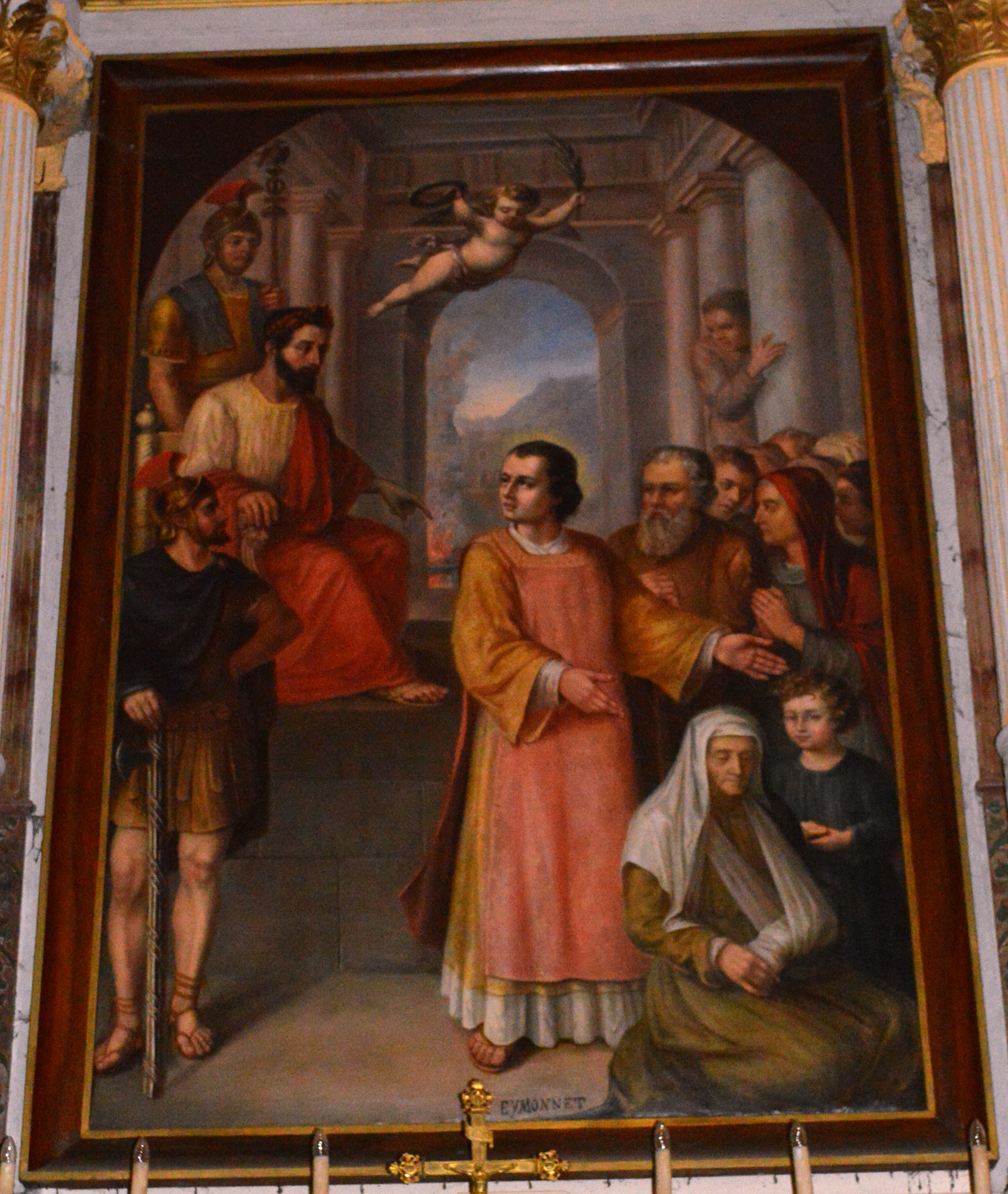
A Painting in the Church

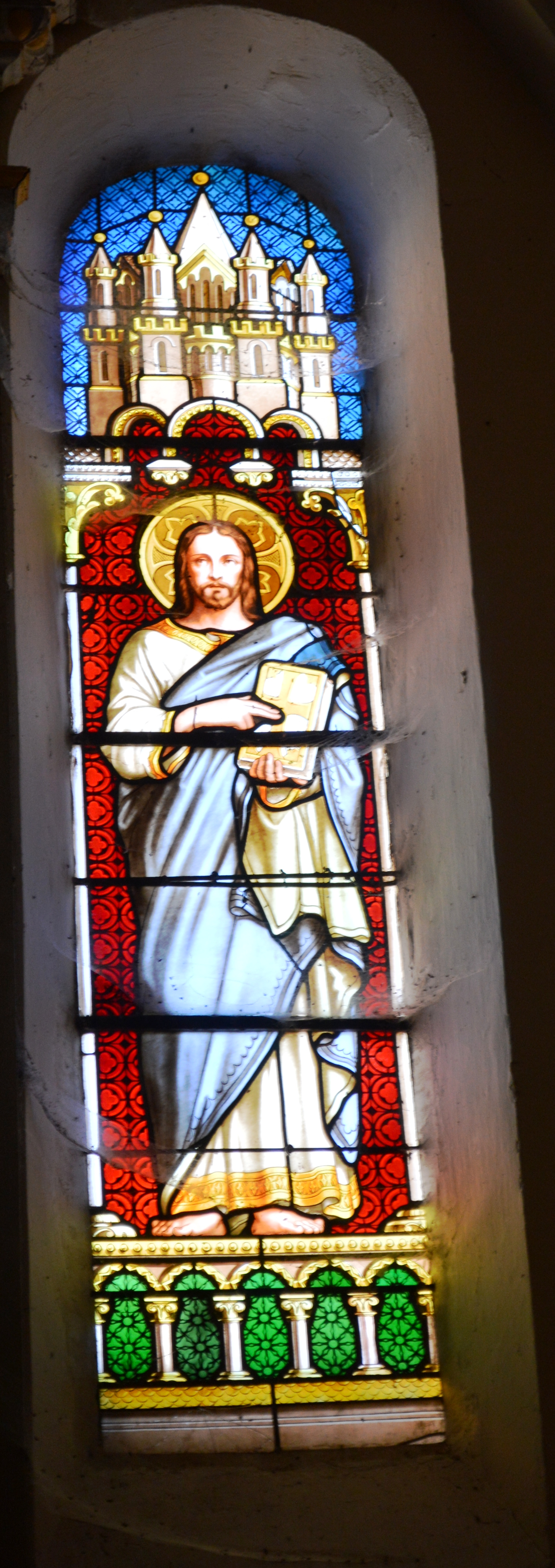
Stained Glass

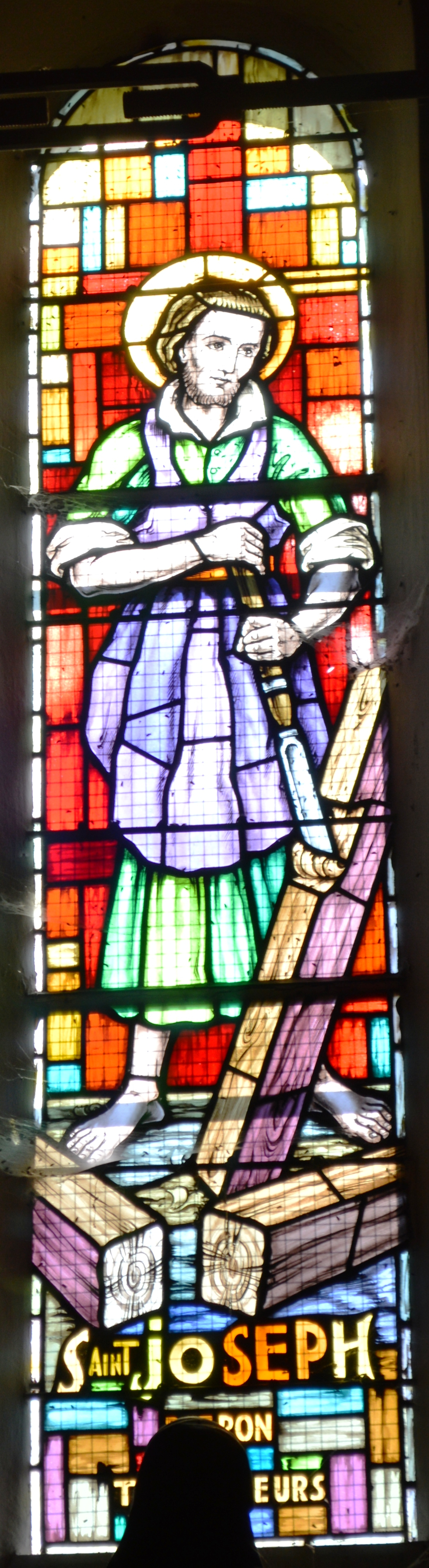
Stained Glass - Saint Joseph

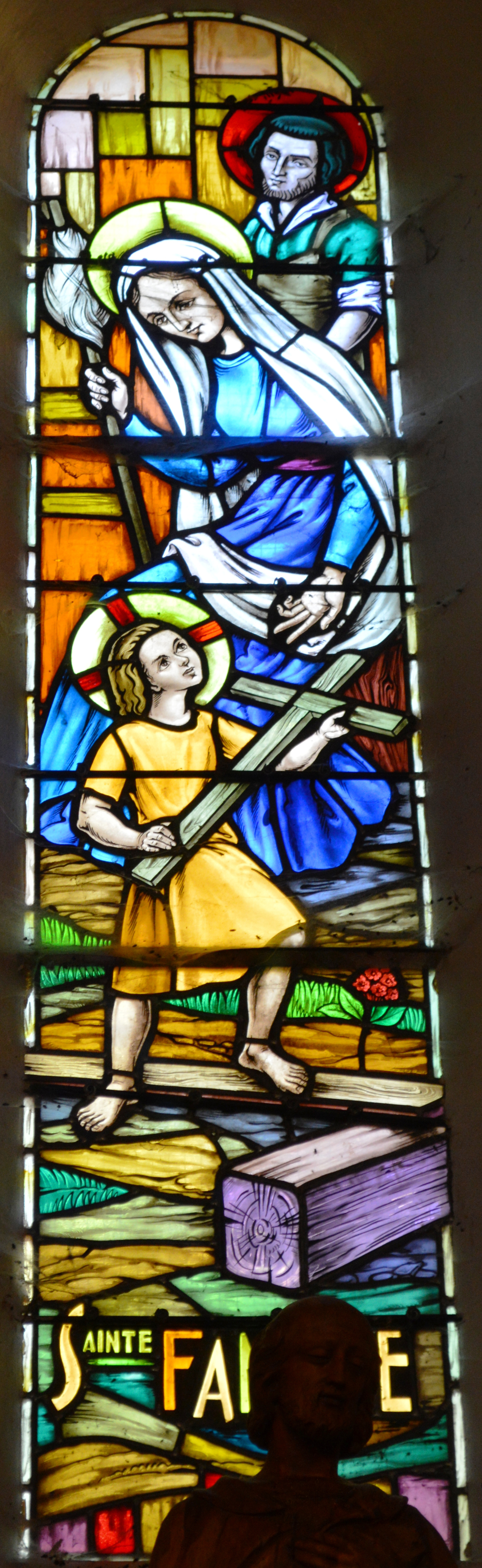
Stained Glass

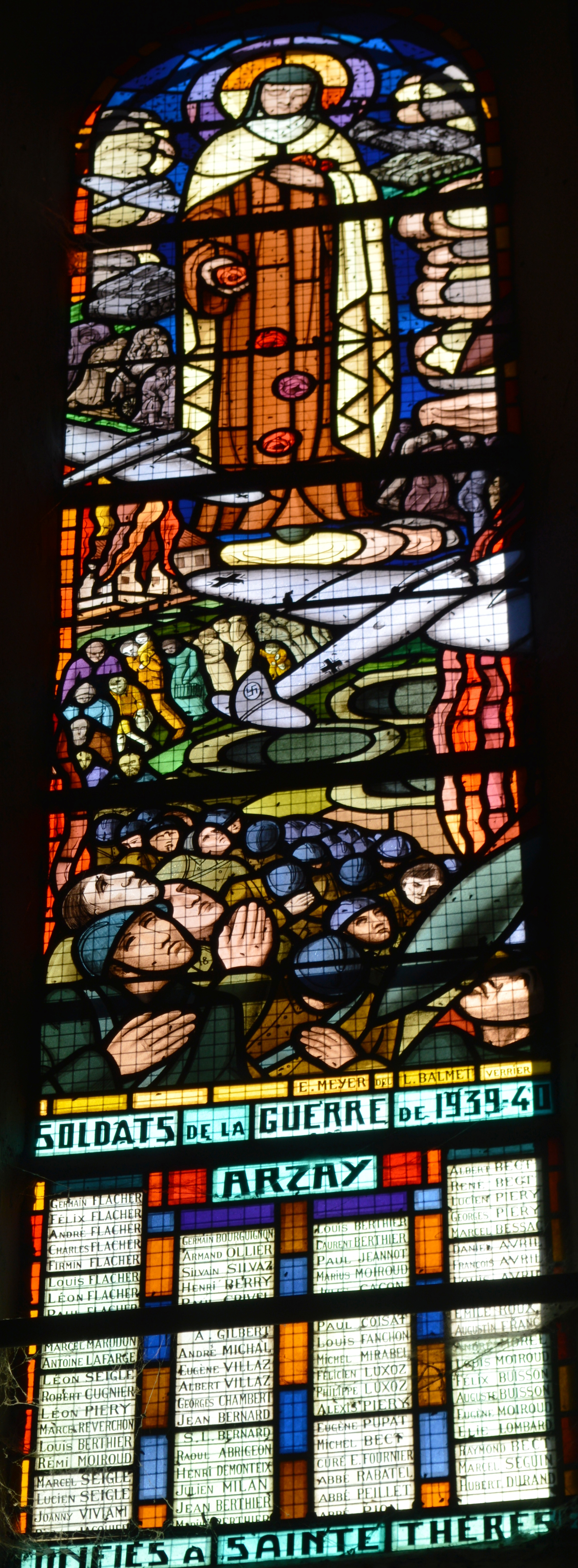
Stained Glass - 2nd World War

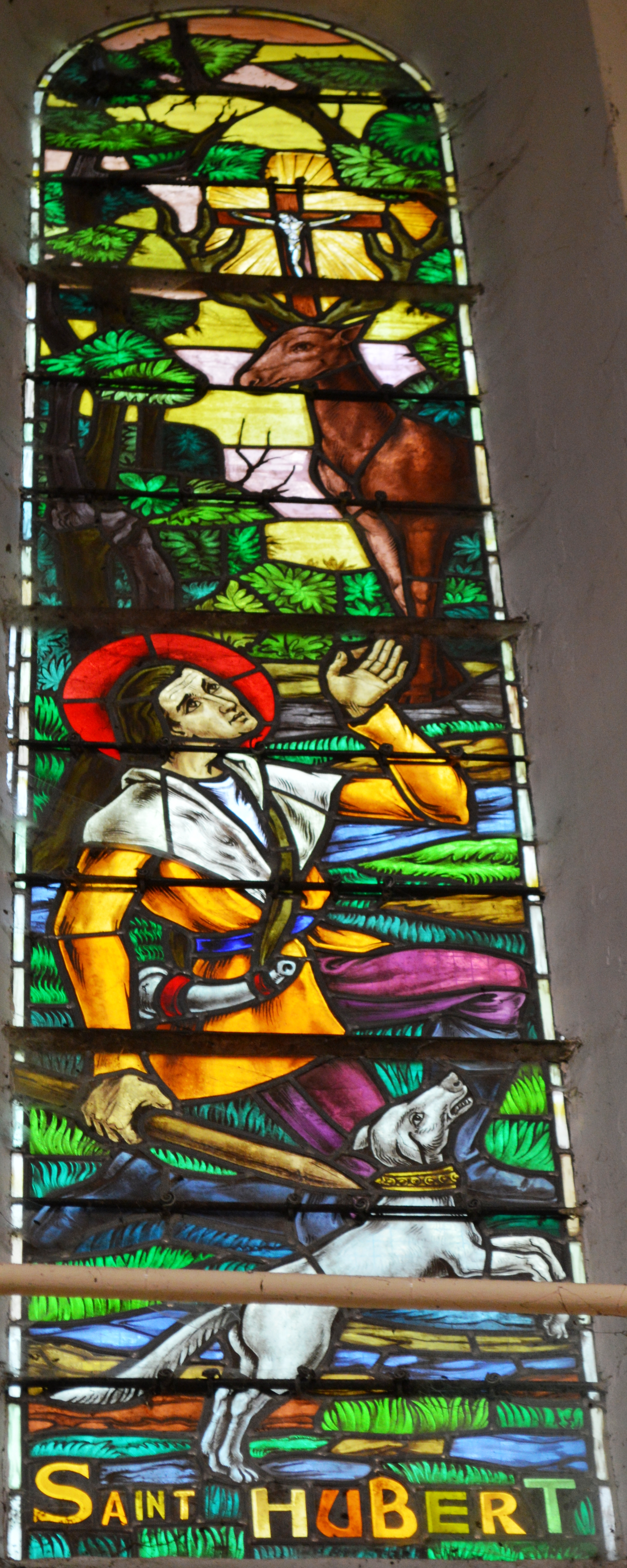
Stained Glass - Saint Hubert

== Life in the commune ==
- A Bread Festival in the last Sunday of August

== Notable people linked to the commune ==
- The Chambaran family, gentleman glassmakers of Arzay, allied to the great Daupinois families in the 17th century.

== See also ==
- Communes of the Isère department
