= List of sculptures in Notre-Dame de Paris =

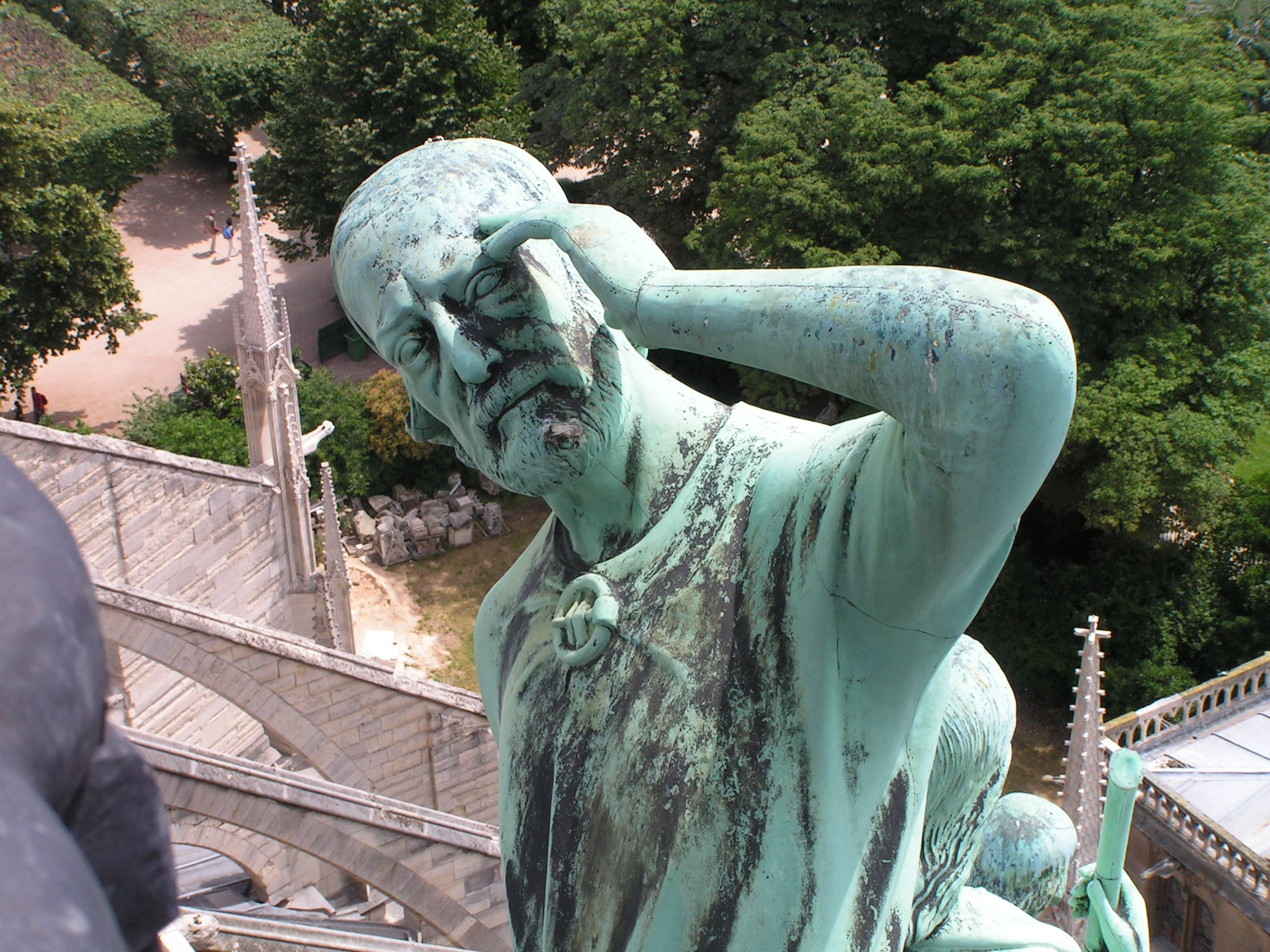
Statue of Thomas the Apostle, with the features of restorer Eugène Viollet-le-Duc, at the base of the spire

This is a list of sculptures in Notre-Dame de Paris.

Stone, copper, and bronze statues, including statues of the twelve Apostles that surrounded the base of the spire, had been removed from the site days prior to the 2019 fire as part of the renovations.

== Sculptures in Notre-Dame de Paris ==
Image	Name	Location	Artist	Date	Notes
	Adam	West facade			
	Eve	West facade			
	Angel of the Resurrection	Roof			
	Denis of Paris	West facade			
	Saint Stephen	West facade			
	Gallery of Kings	West facade			
	Pietà	Interior	Nicolas Coustou	1723	
	Louis XIII	Interior	Guillaume Coustou		Louis XIII consecrating his kingdom to the Virgin Mary. See The Vow of Louis XIII
	Jeanne d'Arc	Interior	Charles Desvergnes		See Joan of Arc
	Grand lutrin	Interior	Placide Poussielque-Rusand	1868	
	Le Stryge	Roof			
	Virgin of Paris	Interior		14th century	
	Madonna and Child	West facade			
	Ecclesia	West facade			See Ecclesia and Synagoga
	Synagoga	West facade			See Ecclesia and Synagoga
Notre Dame Cathedral Statues - Front Entrance	Unknown	Left of Front Entrance			

== See also ==
- List of bells in Notre-Dame de Paris
