= Charles Desvergnes =

French sculptor

Charles Desvergnes (1860–1928) was a French sculptor.

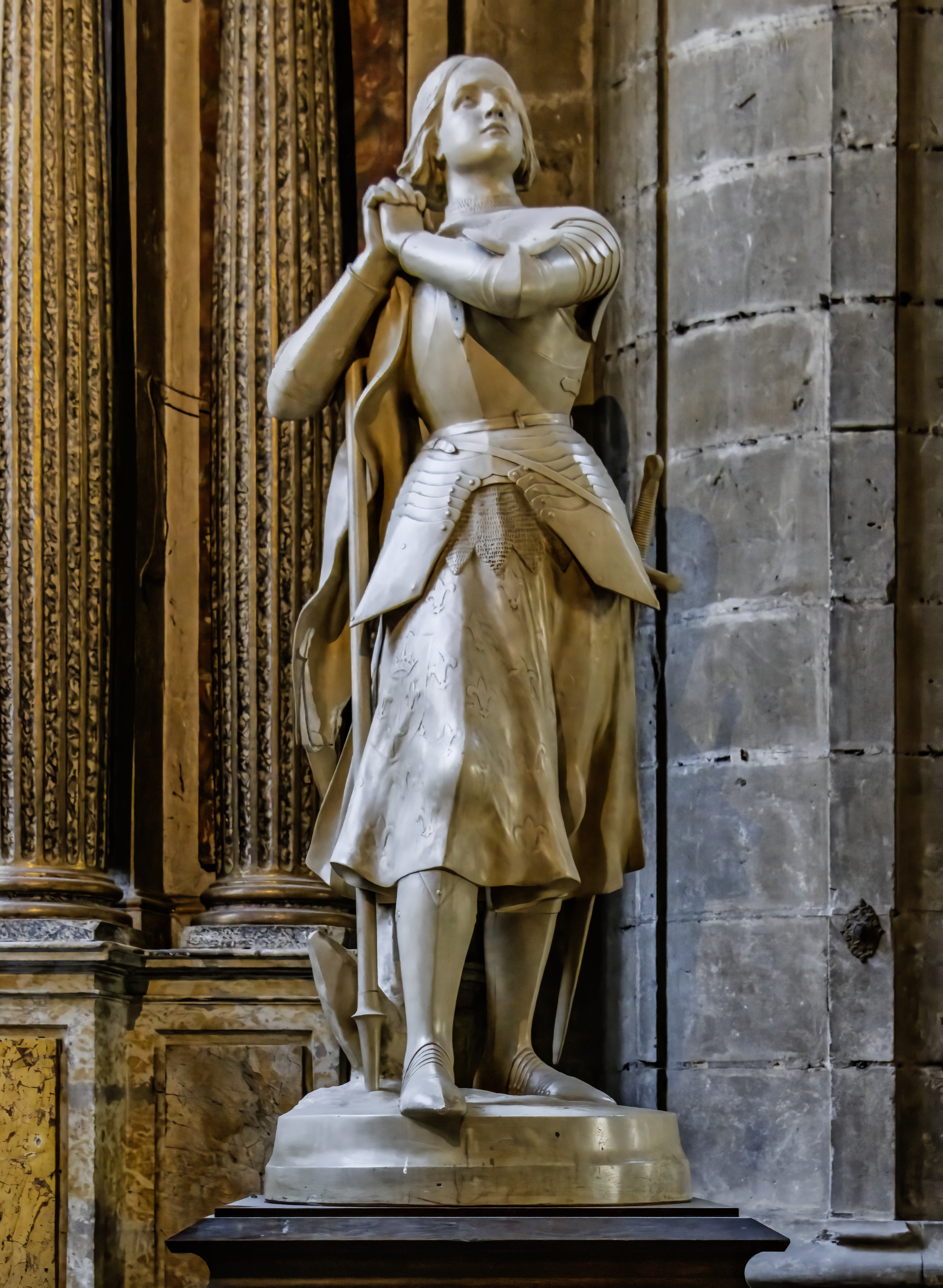
Desvergnes' Joan of Arc. Seen here in the Cathédrale Sainte-Marie d'Auch

== His life and achievements ==
Desvergnes was born in Bellegarde in Loiret, the son of a working-class family; his father was a baker. At his father's bakery, Desvergnes often used the dough to make models and his prowess came to the attention of the local Lord of the Manor, Charles Galopin, who introduced the young Desvergnes to the Paris sculptor Chapu.

By the age of 15, he had passed the entrance exams for the École des Beaux-Arts in Paris. The Conseil Général du Loiret and his home town financed his years as a student and he was to win several prizes whilst at the school. He was runner up for the Rome prize in 1887 and received the prize itself in 1889 for his high relief "Le Retour de l'enfant prodigue". He was subsequently accepted at the "Villa Médicis" in Rome and studied sculpture there for 5 years.

On his return to France he received some prestigious commissions for public monuments including a monument to the neurologist Dr Duchenne and in 1899 his "monument commémoratif du combat des Aydes au faubourg Bannier" was inaugurated in Orléans. His major break through came with a commission to work on the monument at Melun, another Franco-Prussian war memorial. For this he was to receive the "Legion d'Honneur".

It was his long collaboration with Marcel Marron in Orleans that was to ensure that Desvergnes' work had the maximum exposure. Over the years 1902 to 1912, Desvergnes designed and made statues depicting Joan of Arc and Marron made copies of these works and marketed them to churches throughout France. The statues were life size. Desvergnes also sculpted some busts of Joan of Arc and these were again marketed by Marron.

In the years after the end of the Great War, there was a huge demand in France for war memorials. The loss of life had been enormous and every city, town and village in France felt the need to honour those who had lost their lives. There was a strict line drawn in France between public war memorials and those to be erected in parish churches and other religious buildings so in many cases communities sought to have a public and a religious memorial.

Again Desvergnes worked with Marron and designed and sculpted several memorials which Marron was to copy and market.

Thus Desvergnes' bas-relief of an angel drawing the attention of a dying soldier to Jesus on the cross, his composition showing an angel about to crown a soldier and his composition showing a soldier resting his foot on a German helmet can be seen throughout France.

Desvergnes' final work was at Beauvais Cathedral and was a study of the Bishop of Beauvais, Le Senne, seeking a pardon from Joan of Arc. Sadly Desvergnes died before this work was completed and it was finished off by others.

Towards the end of his life, Desvergnes left a collection of his work to his home town of Bellegarde, where it can be seen at the Pavillon d'Antin.

Desvergnes' work can be put into the following categories.

== Early works including submissions for the Prix de Rome ==
| Work | Location | Subject, notes and references |
|---|---|---|
| Bust of Thomy-Thiéry | Paris | Desvergnes executed a bust of Thomy-Thiéry (1823–1902) an art collector and benefactor of the Louvre. This can be seen in the Musée d'Orsay. |
| Copy of a work of antiquity | Paris | Desvergnes' submission for the 1892 Prix de Rome was this copy of a work of antiquity. This is held in the archives of the Beaux-arts de Paris, l'école nationale supérieure. |
| Gaston Thys | Angers | This bronze bas-relief is held in the Musée des Beaux-arts in Angers. The work is dated 1892 and was executed in Rome. |
| "Tête de Christ ou la Résignation" | Paris | This was a work which Desvergnes submitted as part of his diploma course in 1888. This is held in the archives of the Beaux-arts de Paris, l'école nationale supérieure. |
| "Le retour de l'enfant prodigue" | Paris | This was Desvergnes' winning submission for the 1889 Prix de Rome. This is held in the archives of the Beaux-arts de Paris, l'école nationale supérieure. |
| "L'Egypte et l'Assyrie initiant la Grèce à la pratique des Arts" | Paris | Part of Desvergnes' diploma work and dating to 1884. |

== Early works. Public statues and monuments ==
| Work | Location | Subject, notes and references |
|---|---|---|
| Monument to Dr. Duchenne | Boulogne-sur-Mer, Pas-de-Calais | This work is dated 1899 and comprises a bronze bust of Dr Duchenne. The bust is positioned on a pedestal and below this bust a female figure is depicted writing an inscription on the pedestal. This female figure was meant to represent the rebirth of Boulogne. The monument is located in the boulevard Albert Ier. It is recorded that Desvergnes sculpted the bust free of charge. The bronze casting work was carried out by "les Forges de Bussy". Dr Duchenne was a native of Boulogne (1806–1875) and a pioneer in neurology. He described progressive muscular dystrophy which is called "Duchenne's myopathy" as a tribute to his work. |
| Tomb of J. M. Vallet | Paris | Desvergnes added this magnificent sculpture to the grave of J. M. Vallet in the Père-Lachaise cemetery in Paris. The tomb of Vallet |
| Monument aux morts de la guerre de 1870–1871 et des colonies | Melun | There are few monuments in France linked to the 1870–1871 war and it has been remarked that this may have been because they were defeated; there was little to celebrate! The pressure to build this monument came from Buval's "Union des Défenseurs de la Patrie en Seine-et-Marne." and the public support he received raised sufficient funds to cover the commissioning. Desvergnes was chosen to do the sculptural work and this for him would have been his first prestigious commission. The monument was inaugurated on 2 June 1901. At the top of the monument and on a pedestal is a bronze allegory of France. She holds the National flag and has three soldiers around her. At one side of this and on a smaller pedestal, Desvergnes' composition depicts another allegorical depiction of France, again in bronze and this time dressed in peasant dress and holding a sheaf of wheat. She is shown handing a rifle to a youngster. Looking at the monument from the rear we see that the third soldier on the top of the pedestal has been wounded and possibly mortally so. The monument is located in the boulevard Chamblain, and on the sides of the pedestal are bronze emblems. For the Navy we have an anchor, a beret, a rifle and some laurel, for the infantry, a helmet, rifle and lance and for the cavalry, a cuirasse, helmet, sabre and lance. |
| Statue of Jean de Meung | Meung-sur-Loire | This statue honours the writer Jean de Meung, author of "Roman de la Rose". |
| The bust of Dr.Denance | Varennes-Changy, Loiret | The bust of Dr.Denance is on a pedestal near the parish church. The original bust was in bronze and dedicated to Dr.Denance who had done much work to combat tuberculosis in the Loiret region. The present bust is of plaster as the Germans melted down the bronze bust to be used to make armaments during their occupation of the Second World War. |
| Monument to Gaillardin | Montargis | In 1920 Desvergnes was commissioned to executed the bronze monument which celebrated the victory of Gaillardin over the English in 1427. The episode is summarised on the inscription ": LE 3 SEPTEMBRE 1427 / APRES TROIS MOIS D'HEROIQUES EFFORTS / LES MILICES MONTARGOISES SECOURUES PAR DUBOIS / POTHON [?] XAINTRAILLES [?] LAMIRE / FORCERENT LES ANGLAIS COMMANDES / PAR WARWICK SUFFOLK ET LA POOL / A LEVER LE SIEGE DE LA VILLE / GAILLARDIN / CITOYEN DE MONTARGIS / S'EMPARA DE L'ETENDARD DE WARWICK / CET ETENDARD FUT BRULE EN In1789 / EN SIGNE DE FRATERNITE / DES NATIONS" In Desvergnes' composition Gaillardin stands with his foot on the chest of Warwick brandishing Warwick's flag in triumph. |
| Monument des Aydes | Orléans | Monument dedicated to an episode of the 1870-1871 war when Orléans was defended against the German invaders. The inscription reads "V. ARAGO 1833-1870; AUX DEFENSEURS / D'ORLEANS / 11 OCTOBRE 1870" Commemorates an action in which 5000 French soldiers faced 40,000 German soldiers and the commandant Arago was killed and is held as a national hero. |
| Monument aux morts- War of 1870–71 | Thouars, Deux-Sèvres | This monument remembering the Franco-Prussian War was inaugurated on 16 November 1902. |
| Bust of Doctor Henri Poirot-Delpech | Sèvres | Desvergnes executed this bust in 1908. Poirot-Delpech had been the local mayor. |

== Early works. Medallions, bas-relief portraits ==
| Work | Location | Subject, notes and references |
|---|---|---|
| Mme Desvergnes Mère | Nemours | Desvergnes executed a medallion depicting his mother in 1890. This is now held in the collections of the Château-Musée in Nemours. |
| C. Erlanger | Nemours | Desvergnes executed a bas-relief depicting C. Erlanger in 1891. The work indicates that it was executed in Rome. Erlanger was a good friend of Desvergnes. This is now held in the collections of the Château-Musée in Nemours. |
| Le prince Jérôme Napoléon | Nemours | Desvergnes executed a medallion depicting Prince Jérôme Napoléon. This work is also dated 1891 and inscribed "Roma". This is now held in the collections of the Château-Musée in Nemours. |
| Lily de Trützschler | Nemours | Desvergnes executed a bas-relief in 1890 depicting Lily de Trützschler. The inscription indicates work executed in Rome. This is now held in the collections of the Château-Musée in Nemours. |
| A. de Ridder | Nemours | Desvergnes executed a bas-relief depicting A.de Ridder. Work dated 1890. This is now held in the collections of the Château-Musée in Nemours. |

There are several other Desvergnes medallions and bas-relief portraits held in the Nemours museum. These include studies of Leopoldo Taussig and U. Moreau, as well as a study entitled "Portrait d'homme" and another titled "Portrait de jeune femme".

== Depictions of Joan of Arc (Jeanne d'Arc) and St Michael marketed by Marcel Marron ==
Through Marcel Marron, Desvergnes marketed several life-size models of Joan of Arc. The first was entitled "Sainte Jeanne d'Arc" and was catalogued as the "modéle universel". It was available in various sizes. In this work Joan has her hands clasped together, with one arm linked around a flag. She has a sword hanging from her right hip. Her hair is parted in the centre. The original work was carried out by Desvergnes in 1909. The next model dates to 1912 and is entitled "Jeanne d'Arc s'élevant a la Gloire Céleste". It was also marketed as the "modéle du Centenaire". It was available in five sizes. Here Desvergnes depicts Joan holding a flag in her right hand whilst her left hand is held up from her side. Here the sword hangs down from her waist and in front of her. She wears her hair in a fringe. The third model is known as the "Modéle de Trouville" and has the title "Jeanne d'Arc Triomphante". This was available in three sizes. Easy to distinguish from the earlier models as Jeanne wears a helmet. Again she holds the flag in her right hand whilst her left hand hangs away from her body. Her sword hangs from a belt and is on the left side. There was also a model of a winged St Michel after he had slain the dragon. He stands triumphant with left arm raised whilst his right hand rests on his sword. The dead dragon was depicted at his feet. Very often a church would choose a statue of St Jeanne and one of St Michel and display the two standing together. Marron also offered busts of St Jeanne by Desvergnes. In one she has her hair parted down the centre, in another she is helmeted and in a third she has her hair in a fringe. Interesting to note that each statue issued by Marron was given a unique and sequential number. In the case of the Beaugency statue which is mentioned below the unique number was 169.

| Work | Location | Subject, notes and references |
|---|---|---|
| Statue in Saint-Claude Parish Church at Beaugency | Beaugency, Loiret | In the Beaugency church of Saint Claude, there is a modéle universel edition of a Joan of Arc statue. Each Desvergnes/Marron statue was given a unique number and the Beaugency model was marked number "169". Beaugency also has a bust of St Joan; one of the Desvergnes/Marron editions. |
| The Parish Church of St George. | Azerables, Creuse | In this church the modéle universel was chosen and the records show that it was marked as number "1533". |
| The Parish Church of Douadic | Douadic, Indre | In the church of St Ambroise is another modéle universel this time bearing the number 1688. |
| The Parish Church of Saint Anne. | Amiens, Somme | In this Amiens church in the rue Vulfran-Warmé is a brilliantly coloured version of the modéle universel. |
| The Parish Church of St Martin | Le Pertre, Ille-et-Vilaine | In this Brittany church there is an example of "Jeanne d'Arc s'élevant a la Gloire Céleste". |
| St Joan shown with St Michael slaying the dragon. | Les Pujols, Ariège | The composition in Les Pujols' parish church of St Blaise comprises two large statues of St Joan and St Michael slaying the dragon and a smaller work depicting the immaculate conception. Here the statue of St Michael is the work of the sculptor E. Lancé but the St Joan is a Desvergnes/Marron model. |
| The Parish Church of Sainte-Mélanie | Messé, Deux-Sèvres | In this church there is a Desvergnes/Marron edition of St Michael slaying the dragon. Interesting to note the number on the base is "217" |
| The parish church of Notre-Dame | Losse, Landes | This church has a Desvergnes/Marron figure of St Michael slaying the dragon with St Joan at his side. |

== Other depictions of Joan of Arc ==
| Work | Location | Subject, notes and references |
|---|---|---|
| Saint Joan and the Bishop of Beauvais | Beauvais, Oise | This was Desvergnes' final work and indeed he died before it was completed and it was left to Marc Jacquin and Gabriel Chauvin to finish it off. We see Joan of Arc and the Bishop of Beauvais, Le Senne. Le Senne is asking Joan to forgive the actions of his predecessor Cauchon, whilst an angel is depicted offering the coats of arms of the three Popes and a cardinal. To the rear of the work are bas-reliefs showing Joan's condemnation and another showing her rehabilitation. See images below courtesy Giogo and chatsom. |

== Images Beauvais ==
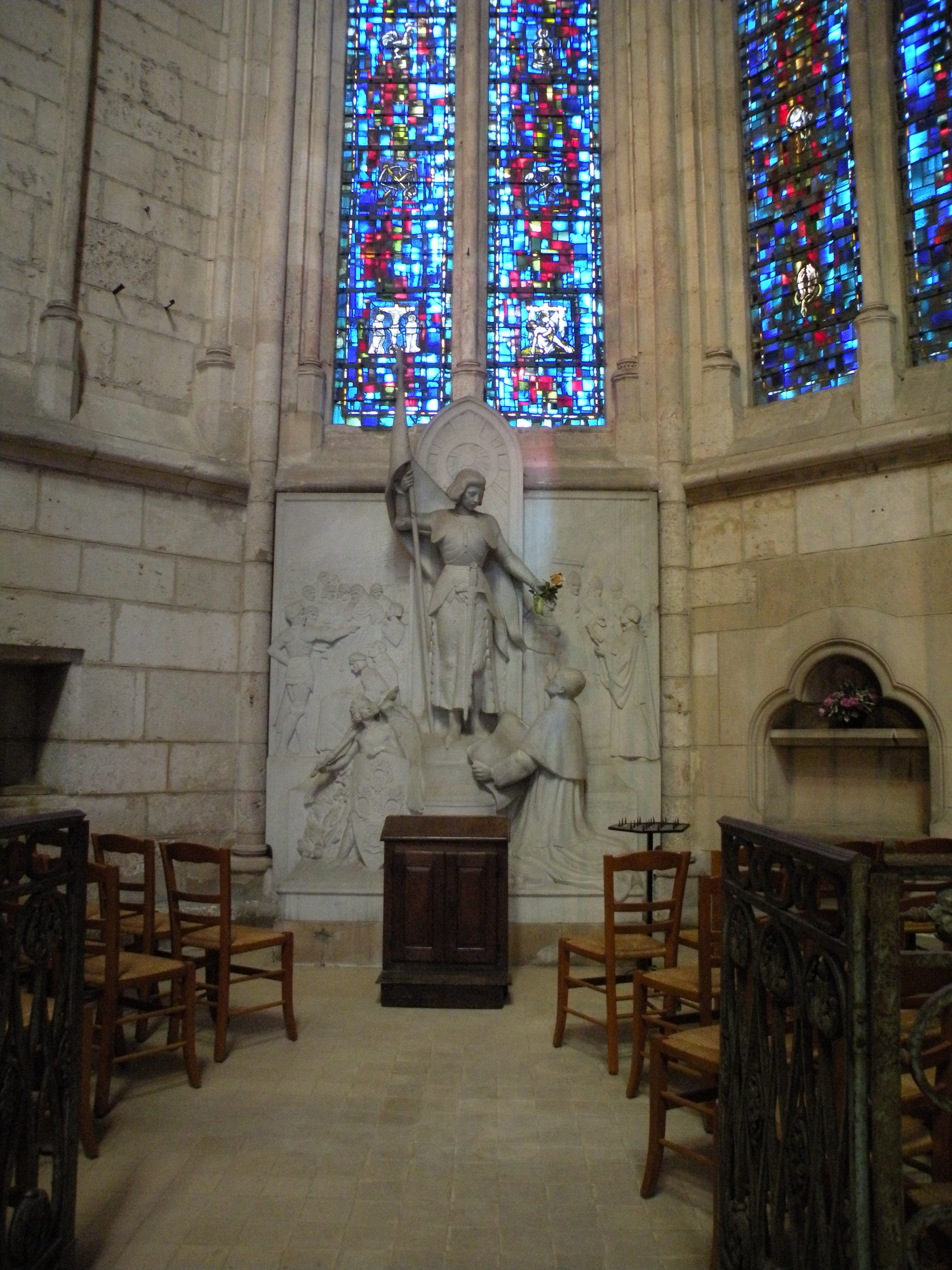

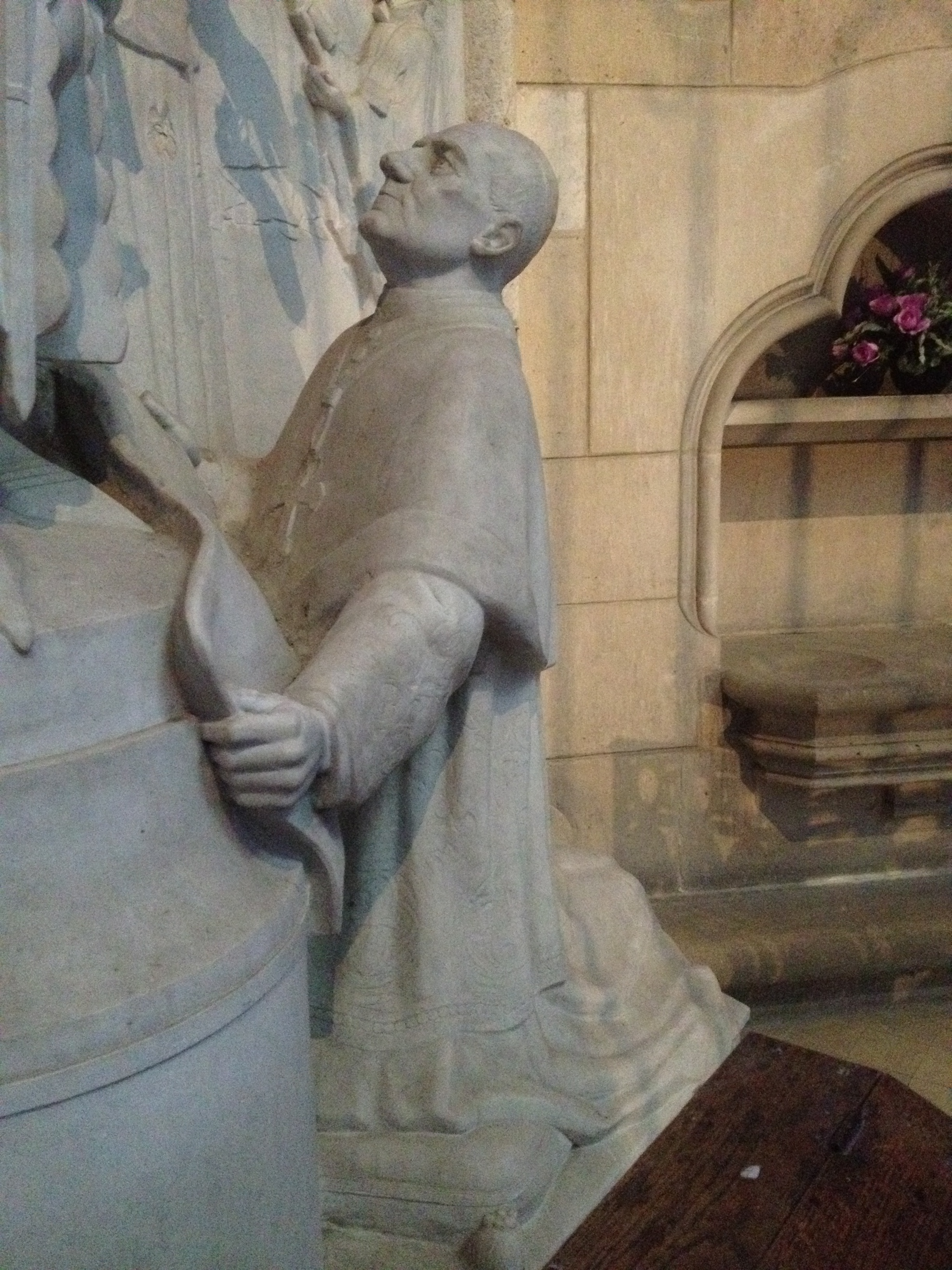
Le Senne begs forgiveness

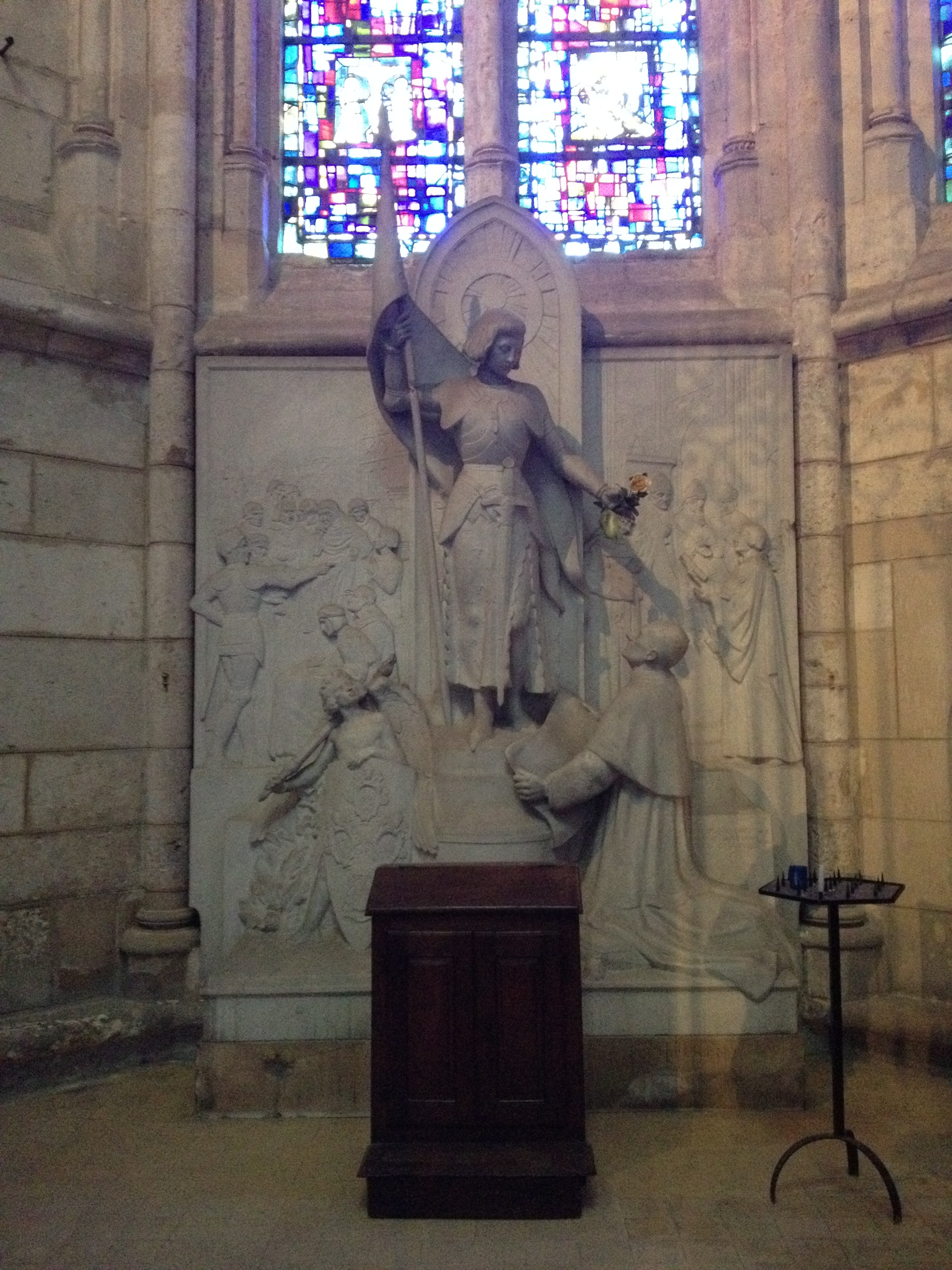

== Other work. Churches ==
| Work | Location | Subject, notes and references |
|---|---|---|
| A "Pieta" in Saint-Ambroise parish church in Douadic | Douadic, Indre | Another Desvergnes work marketed by Marron. This particular one was dedicated to the memory of Tony de Liron, an ex-mayor of Douadic. The work is dated 1919. |
| Chasuble | La Souterraine, Creuse | For the La Souterraine parish church of the Assomption-de-la-Très-Sainte-Vierge, Desvergnes designed gold ornamentation for a chasuble. |
| Sainte Thérèse de l'Enfant Jésus | Lille, Nord | The church of St Michel has a Desvergnes/Marron statue depicting Sainte Thérèse de l'Enfant Jésus. |
| The convent of the carmélites Notre-Dame-de-l'Incarnation | Tours, Indre-et-Loire | This convent has a Desvergnes/Marron piece depicting St Joseph. |

Some of Desvergnes' monument aux morts are listed below as are details of his statues of Joan of Arc. It must be stressed that the list is not definitive.

The lists identify where monument aux morts were made and marketed through Masson, and have been recorded where possible by the model involved. Otherwise Desvergnes did work with other founders or other marketing arms and also produced the occasional monument aux mort independently. Again separate lists have been drawn up.

== Monuments aux morts. Models marketed by Marcel Marron ==
Marcel Marron was a company based in Orleans who sold statues and memorials. They worked with Charles Desvergnes and their joint works, mostly bas-reliefs, and of a religious nature, can be seen throughout France. The most popular works were-"Ange de reconnaissance couronnant un poilu", "Le Divin modèle", "L'Héroïque poilu de France" and "Lauriers célestes". The composition of "Ange de reconnaissance couronnant un poilu" comprises an angel, a soldier and a central upright stone. Normally the names of the men remembered would be inscribed on this stone and sometimes an epitaph. The angel stands at the back of the upright stone. She has a sprig of laurel in her left hand and in her right hand she holds a crown. She holds this crown over the head of the soldier who stands to the right of the central upright. He stands with hands held together and legs crossed. In the "Le Divin modèle", we have a wounded or dying soldier being comforted by a winged angel. She is pointing to the figure of Christ on the cross which is behind them and which appears to be rising up from the trenches where we see soldiers carrying the wounded away from the front line. "L'Héroïque poilu de France" depicts a standing soldier who is resting his foot on the spiked helmet worn by German soldiers. It was this model which the Germans were to take exception to during the Second World War occupation and many such monuments were destroyed. The composition of "Lauriers célestes" was of three elements. In the centre Desvergnes depicted the crucified Christ and to the left an angel carrying some laurel. This and the panel to the left was an ornate composition with fruit, oak leaves and other foliage.

=== Monuments aux morts. Models marketed by Marcel Marron."Ange de reconnaissance couronnant un poilu" ===
| Work | Location | Subject, notes and references |
|---|---|---|
| The monument aux morts at Mennevret | Mennevret, Aisne | In the parish church is an "Ange de reconnaissance couronnant un poilu" |
| The monument aux morts at Eréac | Éréac | An example of "Ange de reconnaissance couronnant un poilu", a version in plaster inaugurated 18 September 1921. |
| The monument aux morts at Mézières-sur-Oise | Mézières-sur-Oise, Aisne | Another good example of "Ange de reconnaissance couronnant un poilu". |
| The monument aux morts of Montaigu-de-Quercy | Montaigu-de-Quercy, Tarn-et-Garonne | This church has another "Ange de reconnaissance couronnant un poilu". |
| The monument aux morts at Préveranges | Préveranges, Cher | The monument here was inaugurated 20 June 1923. |
| The monument aux morts at Saint-Civran | Saint-Civran, Indre | Inaugurated 8 March 1923. |
| The monument aux morts at Saint-Hilaire-les-Andrésis | Saint-Hilaire-les-Andrésis, Loiret | Another "Ange de reconnaissance couronnant un poilu". |
| The monument aux mort at Thiézac | Thiézac, Cantal | This monument was given to the parish by Mr and Mrs Pierre Justin Laveissière of Clout in memory of their son who died in combat. |
| The monument aux morts at Saint-Sauveur-d'Aunis | Saint-Sauveur-d'Aunis, Charente-Maritime | In the Priory of Saint-Sauveur which serves as the parish church is a Desvergnes/Marron edition of "Ange de reconnaissance couronnant un poilu". |
| The monument aux morts at Saint-Geours-de-Maremne | Saint-Geours-de-Maremne, Landes | The parish church of St Georges also has a "Ange de reconnaissance couronnant un poilu". |
| The monument aux morts at Léon | Léon, Landes | The monument aux morts at Saint-Geours-de-Maremne is repeated in the Léon parish church of Saint-André. |

This is by no means a complete list of all the copies of "Ange de reconnaissance couronnant un poilu" to be found in French churches

=== Monuments aux morts. Models marketed by Marcel Marron."Le Divin modèle" ===
| Work | Location | Subject, notes and references |
|---|---|---|
| The monument aux morts at Marcoing | Marcoing, Nord | This church has a "Le Divin modèle" |
| The monument aux morts at Semons | Semons, Isère | The version the "Le Divin modèle" in this church was inaugurated on 29 January 1922. |
| The monument aux morts at Malzéville | Malzéville, Meurthe-et-Moselle | The parish church of St Martin in Malzéville has a Desvergnes/Marron "Le Divin modèle".The monument takes the form of a triptych. The bas-relief is in the centre and on either sides are marble plaques with the names of the 233 people, servicemen and civilians, who lost their lives in the Great War. Two further plaques have been added which list those 47 people who were killed in the Second World War. |
| The monument aux morts at Achicourt | Achicourt, Pas-de-Calais | The parish church has a version of "Le Divin modèle". The monument was inaugurated on 13 July 1924. |
| The monument aux morts at Authon-du-Perche | Authon-du-Perche, Eure-et-Loir | Monument inaugurated 23 October 1921. |
| The monument aux morts at Bonny-sur-Loire | Bonny-sur-Loire, Loiret | Another "Le Divin modèle" in the parish church. |

A further church which features "Le Divin modèle" is the parish church at La Ferté-Loupière in Yonne. Again it should be stressed that this is not a definitive list of churches that hold the "Le Divin modèle".

=== Monuments aux morts. Models marketed by Marcel Marron."L'Héroïque poilu de France" ===
| Work | Location | Subject, notes and references |
|---|---|---|
| The monument aux morts at Nibelle. | Nibelle, Loiret | An example of "L'Héroïque poilu de France". The problem with this Desvergnes/Marron edition was that it portrayed a soldier with his foot on the pointed helmets as worn by the German soldiers of the Great War. During the German occupation many such monuments were destroyed or mutilated as the Germans took exception to what they saw as an implied humiliation. After the Second World War, the Nibelle monument was restored but minus the German helmet. The original monument was inaugurated on 4 December 1921. |
| The monument aux morts at Launois-sur-Vence | Launois-sur-Vence, Ardennes | This monument aux morts no longer exists. It disappeared during the German occupation of the Second World War, no doubt as a consequence of its unfavourable treatment of the German helmet! |
| The monument aux morts at Les Noëls | Les Noëls, Loir-et-Cher | The monument survived the Second World War German helmet and all! |

=== Monuments aux morts. Models marketed by Marcel Marron. "Lauriers célestes". ===
| Work | Location | Subject, notes and references |
|---|---|---|
| The monument aux morts at Patay | Patay, Loiret | The monument depicts Jesus on the cross in the centre and lists of the dead on either side. On the right hand side an angel has a crown and some laurel leaves and on the left is a bough of oak leaves and a cross in the foliage at the top. |

== Other Desvergnes/Marron versions of monument aux morts ==
| Work | Location | Subject, notes and references |
|---|---|---|
| The monument aux morts at Espiens | Espiens, Lot-et-Garonne | Another Desvergnes/Marron piece is located in Espiens' parish church Notre Dame. Here the bas-relief shows a dead soldier and a kneeling woman who is covering his body with a flag on which we see part of the words "Honneur" and "Patrie". Behind them is a cross which appears to be rising up from an area of trenches. The names of the 23 men lost in the Great War are listed and the epitaph reads- "CHRETIEN QUE TON FRONT SE DECOUVRE / DEVANT CEUX QUI SONT MORTS POUR TOI". |
| The monument aux Morts at Chiché | Chiché, Deux-Sèvres | In this Desvergnes/Marron edition we have a Jesus on the cross positioned between a statue of the Virgin Mary and a statue of St Joan. In the foreground an angel is seen crowning a soldier. |
| The monument aux morts at Doncourt-lès-Longuyon | Doncourt-lès-Longuyon, Meurthe-et-Moselle | This monument aux morts stands in front of the Doncourt-lès-Longuyon parish church and depicts an angel crowning a soldier. |
| The monument aux morts at Morcenx. | Morcenx, Landes | In the parish church of Saint-Pierre, a Desvergnes/Marron edition depicts an angel on a cloud and holding an olive branch and a crown of laurel leaves. |

=== Monuments aux morts. Other models marketed by Marcel Marron."Grenadier" and others ===
| Work | Location | Subject, notes and references |
|---|---|---|
| The monument aux morts at Gien | Gien, Loiret | The Gien monument featured an allegorical depiction of France and a grenadier. This monument was inaugurated on 30 March 1924. This Marron edition did not prove a popular one. |
| The monument aux morts at Beaune-la-Rolande | Beaune-la-Rolande, Loiret | This monument featured just the Desvergnes/Marron "Grenadier". |
| The monument aux morts at Puiseaux | Puiseaux, Loiret | A Desvergnes/Marron edition that depicted a woman writing the names of those remembered on an upright stone. |
| The monument aux morts at Vincennes | Vincennes, Val-de-Marne | This monument again incurred the wrath of the occupying Germans in the Second World War but the local mairie has kept a small version. This is very much a salute to the soldiers of Vincennes over the years and Desvergnes depicts the King Philippe-Auguste, Saint-Louis, Charles V and Henry IV, the Count of Rantzau, the Prince of Condé, Mazarin, Colbert, La Fayette, Mirabeau, Daumesnil, the Duke of Aumale, the "polytechniciens" of 1814 to 1815, an artillery man and a cavalry. At the very top a French soldier rested his foot on the head of an Imperial German eagle. The whole composition was considered anti-German and dynamited by the German army on 26 July 1940. |
| Monument aux morts in the Cathedral of Périgueux | Périgueux, Dordogne | In this work a bas-relief depicts the Virgin Mary and a kneeling figure who carries a child for her to bless. |

== Monuments aux morts. Models marketed by other founders ==
| Work | Location | Subject, notes and references |
|---|---|---|
| The monument aux morts at Bricquebec | Bricquebec, Manche | In Bricquebec's rue du 11 novembre is a Desvergnes work but this time a model marketed by the founders Durenne. It comprises a pedestal bearing marble plaques indicating the remembrance of the dead of two world wars and a group cast in bronze and depicting a woman wearing a helmet adorned with laurel leaves kissing the face of a dying soldier. The soldier leans his back against a cannon. At the rear of the scene is a cross. |
| The monument aux morts of Villeneuve-le-Roi | Villeneuve-le-Roi, Val-de-Marne | In the parish church of Saint-Pierre and Saint-Paul in Villeneuve-le-Roi, the monument aux morts comprises a part lead, part marble tablet upon which are inscribed the names of the dead. The tablet is set into a wooden surround. The tablet is decorated with an olive branch, oak leaves and fruits. |
| Monument aux morts L'église Notre-Dame-de-l'Assomption-de-Passy | Paris | The monument aux morts in this church is dedicated to the men of the parish of Notre-Dame-de-la-Miséricorde who lost their lives in the Great War. A dying soldier lies before the robed figure of Jesus Christ who gives him the sign of the benediction. |
