= Nantoin =

- Part of Porte-des-Bonnevaux
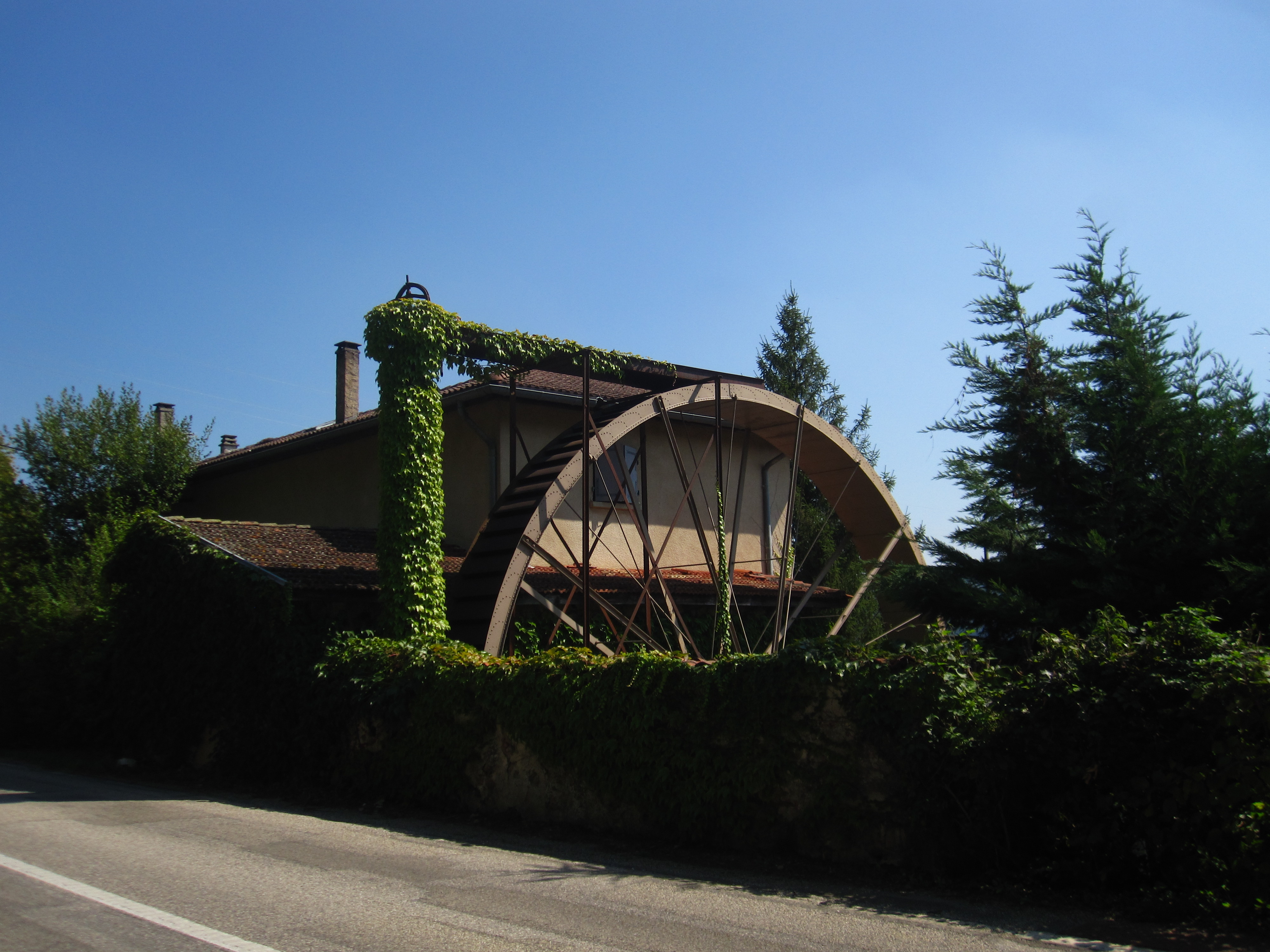
- Mill
- Location of Nantoin
- Location within France Location within Auvergne-Rhône-Alpes
- Coordinates: 45°26′20″N 5°16′15″E
- Country: France
- Region: Auvergne-Rhône-Alpes
- Department: Isère
- Arrondissement: Vienne
- Canton: Bièvre
- Commune: Porte-des-Bonnevaux
- Area^{1}: 9.5 km^{2} (3.7 sq mi)
- Highest elevation: 609 m (1,998 ft)
- Lowest elevation: 430 m (1,410 ft)
- Population (2023): 473
  - Density: 50/km^{2} (130/sq mi)
- Time zone: UTC+01:00 (CET)
  - Summer (DST): UTC+02:00 (CEST)
- Postal code: 38260
- ^{1} French Land Register data, which excludes lakes, ponds, glaciers > 1 km^{2} (0.386 sq mi or 247 acres) and river estuaries.

Nantoin (French pronunciation: [nɑ̃twɛ̃]) is a former commune in the Isère department in southeastern France. On 1 January 2019, it was merged into the new commune Porte-des-Bonnevaux.

== See also ==
- Communes of the Isère department
