= Porte-des-Bonnevaux =

- Commune
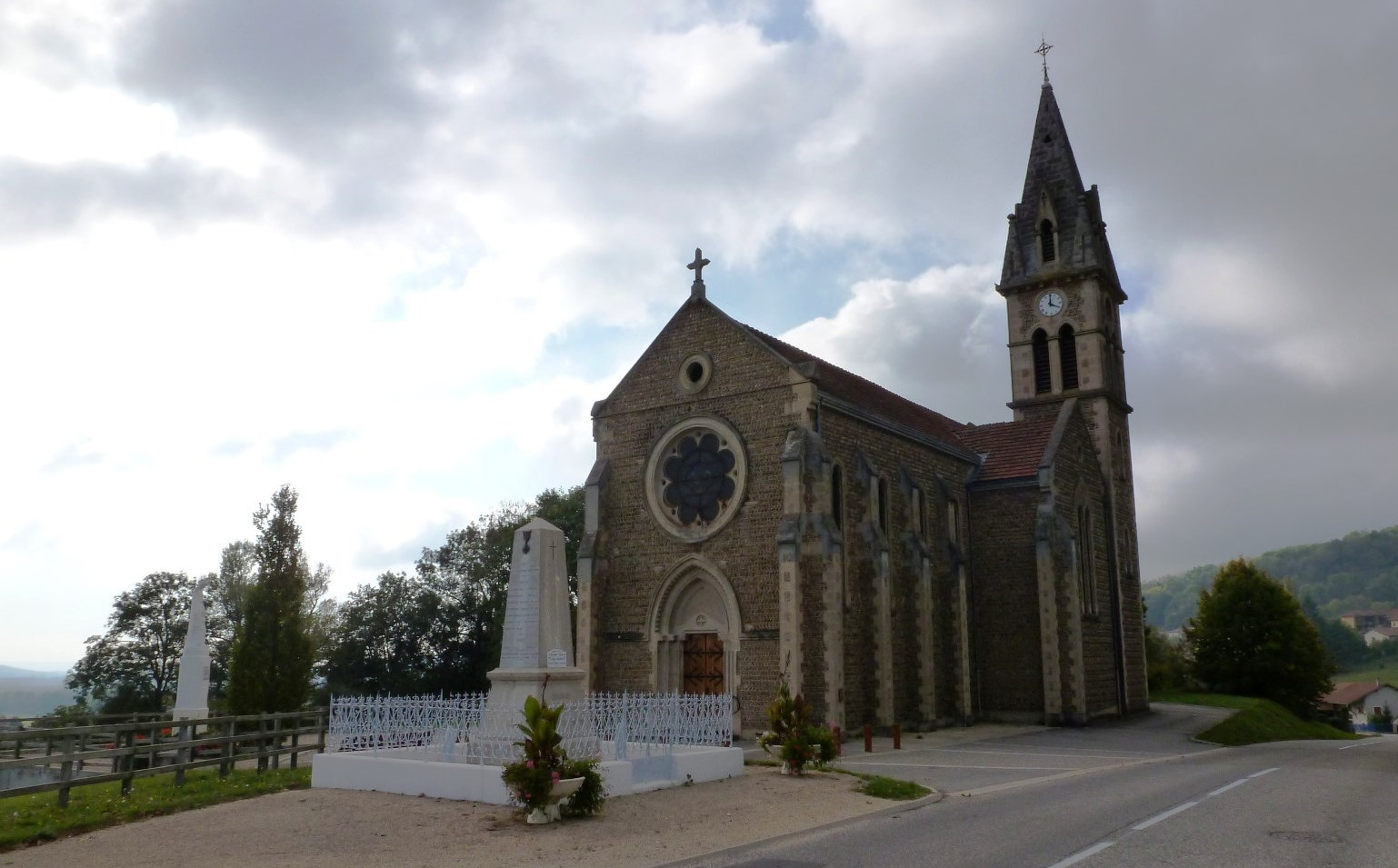
- The church of Semons
- Location of Porte-des-Bonnevaux
- Location within France Location within Auvergne-Rhône-Alpes
- Coordinates: 45°25′58″N 5°11′44″E
- Country: France
- Region: Auvergne-Rhône-Alpes
- Department: Isère
- Arrondissement: Vienne
- Canton: Bièvre
- Intercommunality: Bièvre Isère

Government
  - Mayor (2020–2026): Alain Meunier
- Area^{1}: 43.88 km^{2} (16.94 sq mi)
- Highest elevation: 609 m (1,998 ft)
- Lowest elevation: 375 m (1,230 ft)
- Population (2023): 2,099
  - Density: 47.84/km^{2} (123.9/sq mi)
- Time zone: UTC+01:00 (CET)
  - Summer (DST): UTC+02:00 (CEST)
- INSEE/Postal code: 38479 /38260
- ^{1} French Land Register data, which excludes lakes, ponds, glaciers > 1 km^{2} (0.386 sq mi or 247 acres) and river estuaries.

Porte-des-Bonnevaux (French pronunciation: [pɔʁt de bɔnvo]) is a commune in the Isère department in southeastern France. It was established on 1 January 2019 by merger of the former communes of Semons (the seat), Arzay, Commelle and Nantoin.

== Population ==
Population data refer to the commune in its geography as of January 2025.

Historical population
Year	Pop.	±% p.a.
1968	979	—
1975	1,013	+0.49%
1982	1,214	+2.62%
1990	1,330	+1.15%
1999	1,379	+0.40%
2007	1,684	+2.53%
2012	1,872	+2.14%
2017	2,015	+1.48%
2023	2,099	+0.68%
Source: INSEE

== See also ==
- Communes of the Isère department
