= Commelle =

- Part of Porte-des-Bonnevaux
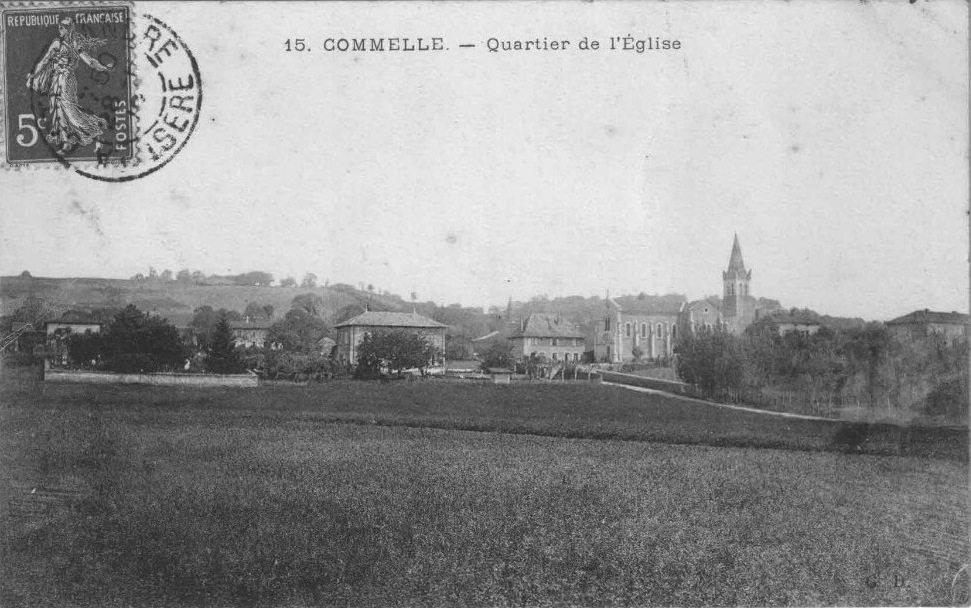
- Commelle at the start of the 20th century
- Location of Commelle
- Location within France Location within Auvergne-Rhône-Alpes
- Coordinates: 45°25′45″N 5°13′37″E
- Country: France
- Region: Auvergne-Rhône-Alpes
- Department: Isère
- Arrondissement: Vienne
- Canton: Bièvre
- Commune: Porte-des-Bonnevaux
- Area^{1}: 14.04 km^{2} (5.42 sq mi)
- Elevation: 420 m (1,380 ft)
- Highest elevation: 587 m (1,926 ft)
- Lowest elevation: 396 m (1,299 ft)
- Population (2022): 1,023
  - Density: 72.86/km^{2} (188.7/sq mi)
- Time zone: UTC+01:00 (CET)
  - Summer (DST): UTC+02:00 (CEST)
- Postal code: 38260
- ^{1} French Land Register data, which excludes lakes, ponds, glaciers > 1 km^{2} (0.386 sq mi or 247 acres) and river estuaries.

Commelle (French pronunciation: [kɔmɛl]) is a former commune in the Isère department in southeastern France. On 1 January 2019, it was merged into the new commune Porte-des-Bonnevaux.

== Population ==
Historical population

Year	Pop.	±% p.a.
1793	728	—
1821	809	+0.38%
1846	756	−0.27%
1872	737	−0.10%
1901	583	−0.81%
1926	517	−0.48%
1946	480	−0.37%
1962	408	−1.01%

Year	Pop.	±% p.a.
1968	401	−0.29%
1975	436	+1.20%
1982	518	+2.49%
1990	563	+1.05%
1999	598	+0.67%
2006	656	+1.33%
2022	1,023	+2.82%

Source: EHESS and INSEE

== See also ==
- Communes of the Isère department
