= Virgin of Paris =

Statue of the Virgin Mary

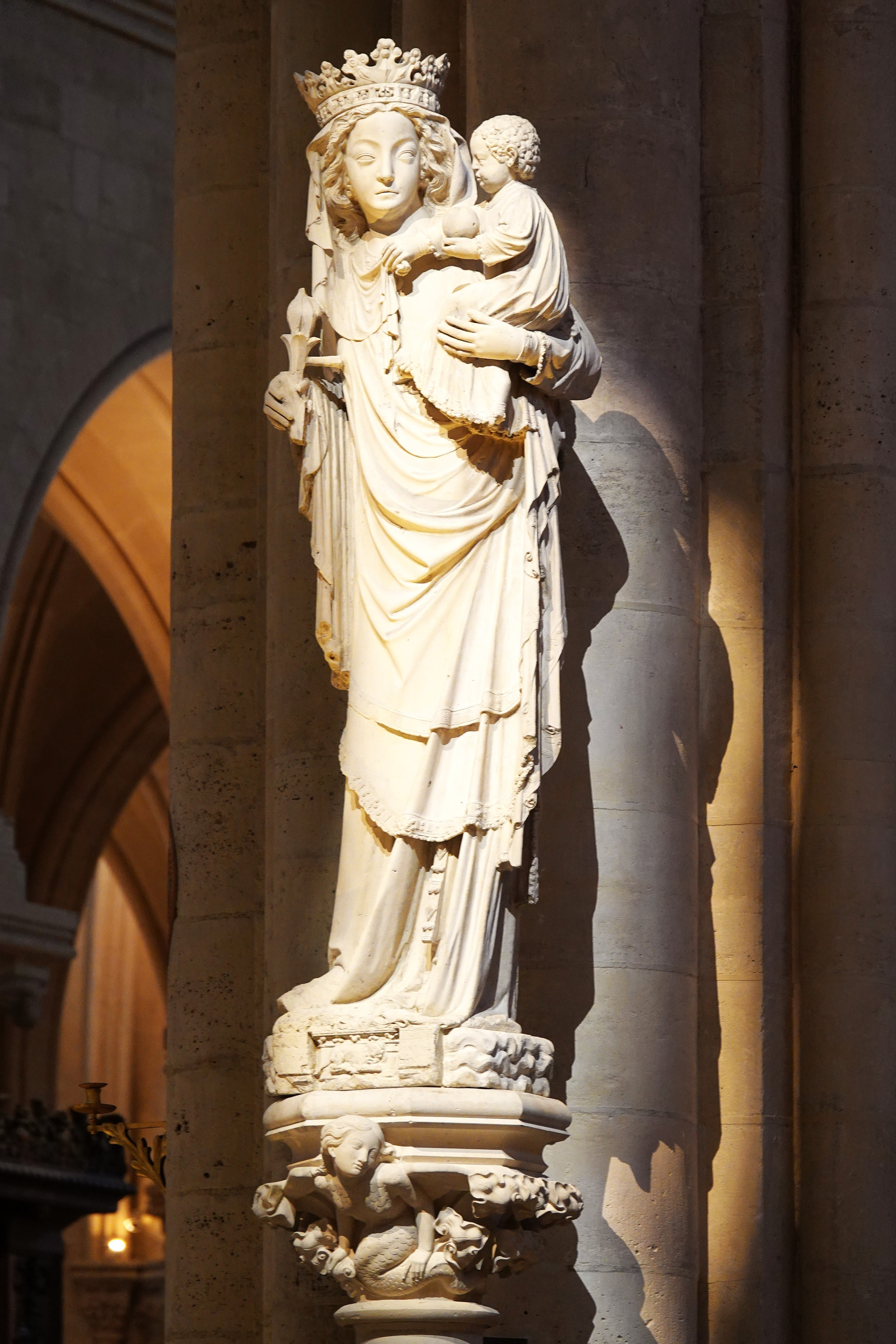
Notre-Dame de Paris, 14th century.

The Virgin of the pillar or Notre-Dame de Paris is a title of the Blessed Virgin that is associated with a near life-size stone statue, 1.8 metres tall, of the Virgin and Child created in the early 14th century. The statue was transferred to Notre-Dame in 1818, it was first placed in the over mantal of the portal of the Virgin to replace the 13th century Virgin, which was destroyed in 1793. In 1855, during the restoration campaign of Viollet-le-Duc, it was installed in its current location at the south-east pillar of the transept, a historically meaningful site since an altar to the Virgin stood at the same place at the end of the 12th century. The statue was commissioned for, and remains in the Cathedral of Notre-Dame in Paris, where it survived the 2019 Notre-Dame fire. It is an example of the court style in Late Gothic sculpture.

The statue is in honour of the Blessed Virgin, mother of Jesus. It retains an emotional appeal that links it to the Strasbourg Death of the Virgin.

== Details ==
In this sculpture, the Virgin Mary is shown standing and holding her son, the Child Jesus, against her body. Unlike previous renditions of these two, both are naturalistic, with recognizable facial features. Typical of most sculptural depictions of the subject in this period, Jesus does not look like a baby, but a miniature adult. The artist tried to counter this by giving him the mannerisms of an infant as he plays with his mother’s veil and holds a ball. Mary wears royal dress and a crown, depicting her as Queen of Heaven. The globe her son holds also alludes to their royalty and holiness, as a reference to Christ as Salvator Mundi (“Saviour of the World”). The orb symbolizes Earth, and how Christ is King of the entire world (see also globus cruciger).

== Style ==
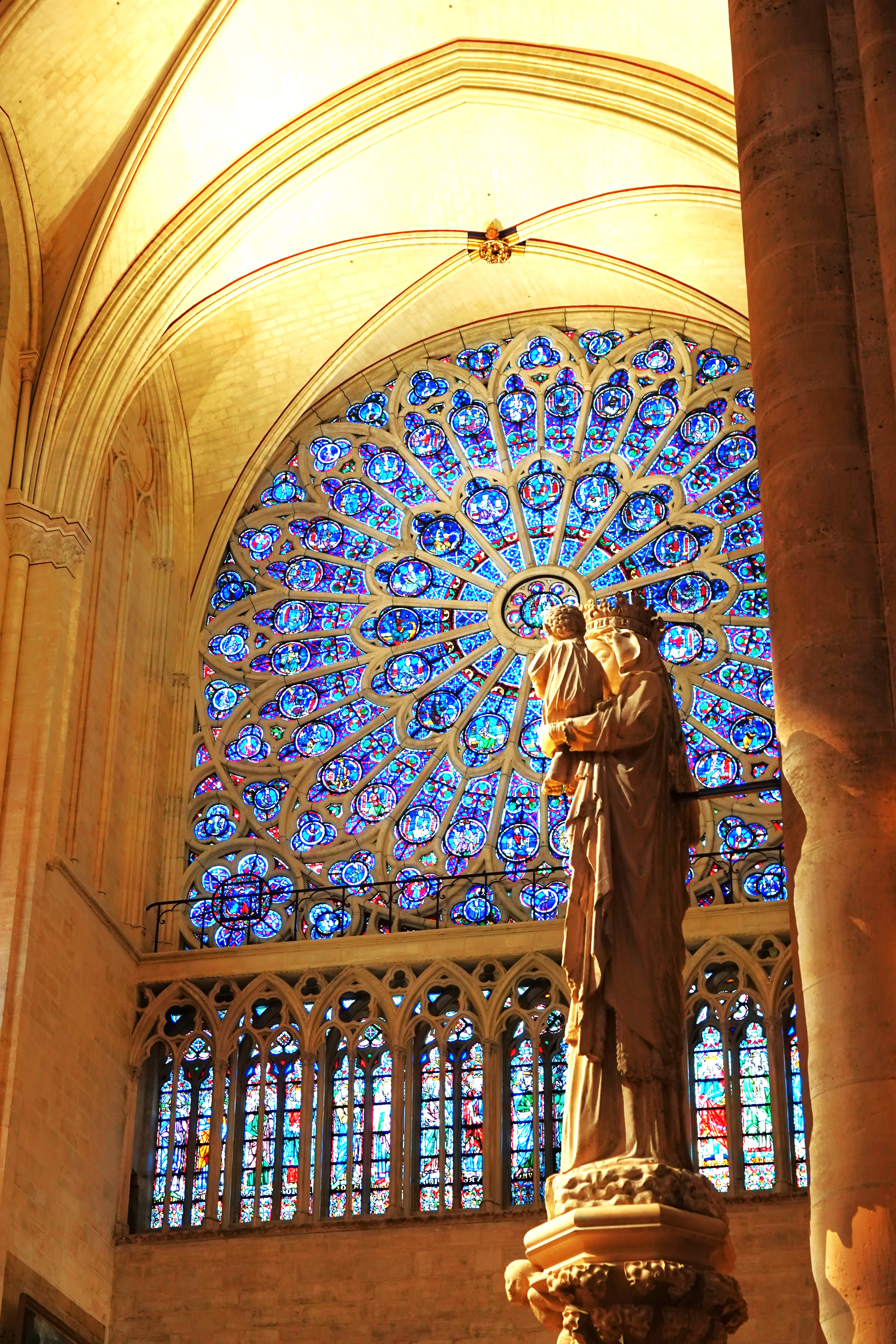
Another view

One of the main characteristics of Gothic sculpture is elegance. Other changes occurred to sculpture, such as less enjambment into the background architecture, the contrasting of light and dark, and the Praxitlian ‘S’ curve. Gothic style moved away from the Romanesque style by simplification. The greatest change though was in sculptures separation from the architectural. Instead of having figures be created against walls or columns, sculptures were carved away from their supports. Also apparent in the piece is the contrast of shadow and light, made evident by the deep recesses in the clothes fabric.

The sculptor of Mary exaggerated the S-curve of her body, a signature element of Gothic style, particularly in beautiful Madonnas. The S-curve did not originate during the Gothic Period of Europe, but well before in Greece. In the 4th century BCE, Greek sculptors were enthralled by the body’s movements and muscles, and tried to capture complete naturalism through the S- curve. For Gothic sculptors, the desired effect was not of body movement, but of elegance and elongation. By the beginning of the fourteenth century and the start of the Late Gothic style, sculptures began to lack in volume. This extension and lightness is evident in Mary’s body.

== In popular culture ==
In the Disney animated movie adaptation of The Hunchback of Notre Dame, Esmeralda sings God Help the Outcasts as her prayer to God through the Virgin of Paris for protection for her fellow Gypsies.

== See also ==
- List of sculptures in Notre-Dame de Paris
