= Semons =

- Part of Porte-des-Bonnevaux
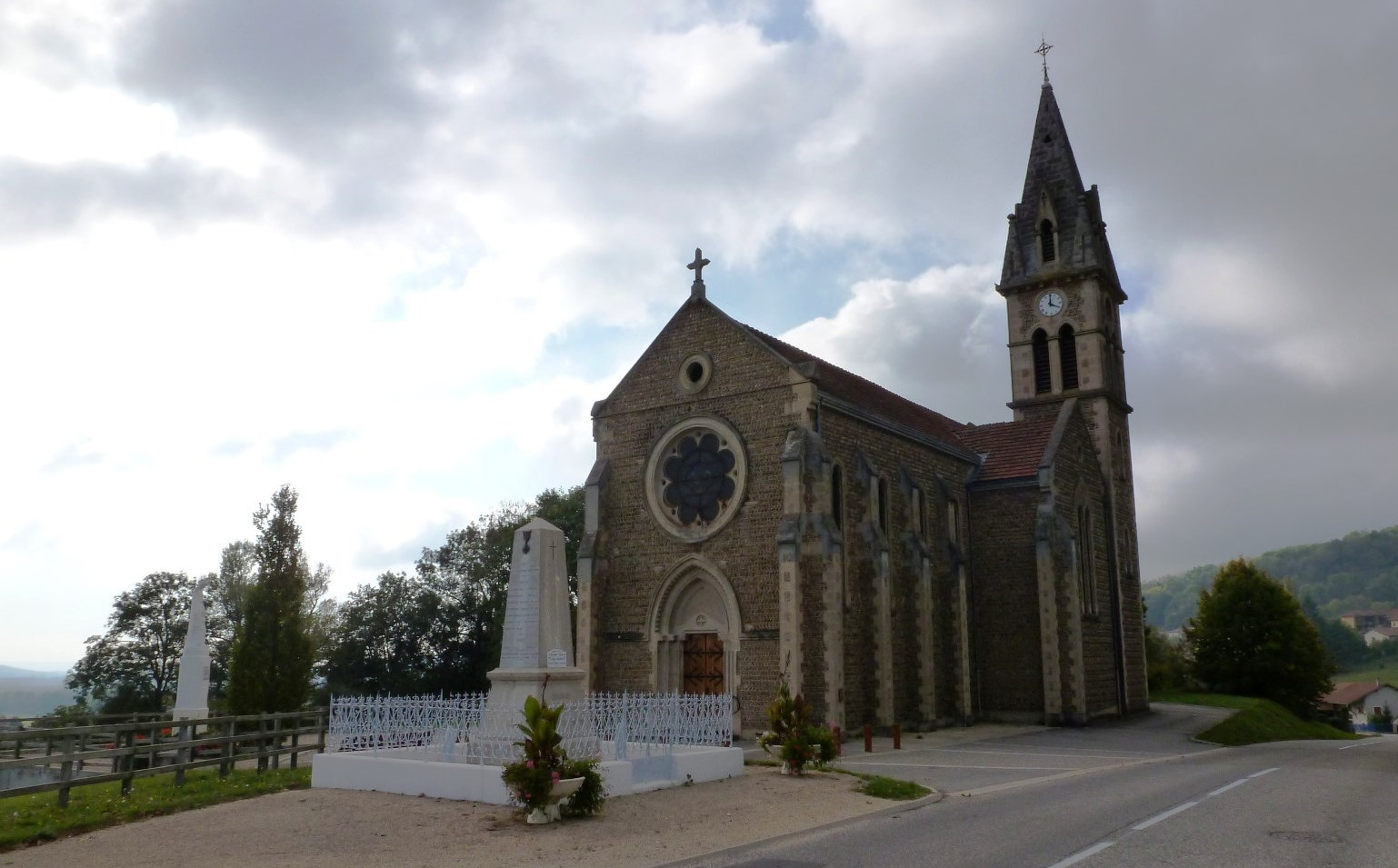
- The church of Semons
- Location of Semons
- Location within France Location within Auvergne-Rhône-Alpes
- Coordinates: 45°25′58″N 5°11′44″E
- Country: France
- Region: Auvergne-Rhône-Alpes
- Department: Isère
- Arrondissement: Vienne
- Canton: Bièvre
- Commune: Porte-des-Bonnevaux
- Area^{1}: 10.55 km^{2} (4.07 sq mi)
- Highest elevation: 564 m (1,850 ft)
- Lowest elevation: 388 m (1,273 ft)
- Population (2023): 366
  - Density: 34.7/km^{2} (89.9/sq mi)
- Time zone: UTC+01:00 (CET)
  - Summer (DST): UTC+02:00 (CEST)
- Postal code: 38260
- ^{1} French Land Register data, which excludes lakes, ponds, glaciers > 1 km^{2} (0.386 sq mi or 247 acres) and river estuaries.

Semons (French pronunciation: [səmɔ̃]) is a former commune in the Isère department in southeastern France. On 1 January 2019, it was merged into the new commune Porte-des-Bonnevaux.

== See also ==
- Communes of the Isère department
