= List of Cistercian monasteries in France =

Cistercian coat of arms

The following is a list of Cistercian monasteries in France, including current and former Cistercian abbeys, and a few priories, on the current territory of France, for both monks and nuns.

These religious houses have belonged, at different times, to various congregations or groups within the Cistercian order, among which the most important, for the French monasteries, are:

- the Cistercians of the Common Observance, including the Cistercian Congregation of the Immaculate Conception;
- the Congregation of the Feuillants (1592–1791) (the Feuillants and Feuillantines)
- the Trappists (Cistercians of the Strict Observance, otherwise known as the Reformed Cistercians)
- the Bernardine Cistercians of Esquermes

Many of these monasteries during the course of their existence have been both Cistercian and Benedictine: see also List of Benedictine monasteries in France.

The dates in brackets are those of the beginning and the end of a monastery's status as a Cistercian house, which may be different from its dates of foundation and suppression.

The names of currently active Cistercian abbeys and independent priories are in bold. Apart from a very few unusually significant ones, dependent priories no longer operational are not usually listed.

== A ==
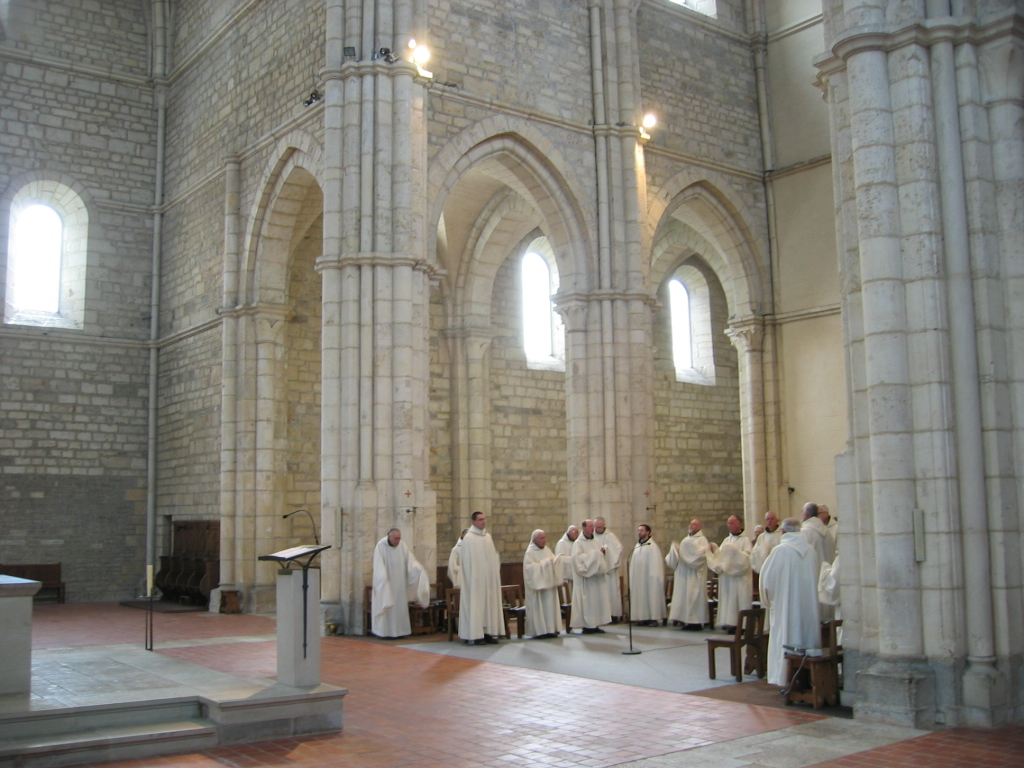
Acey Abbey (Jura)

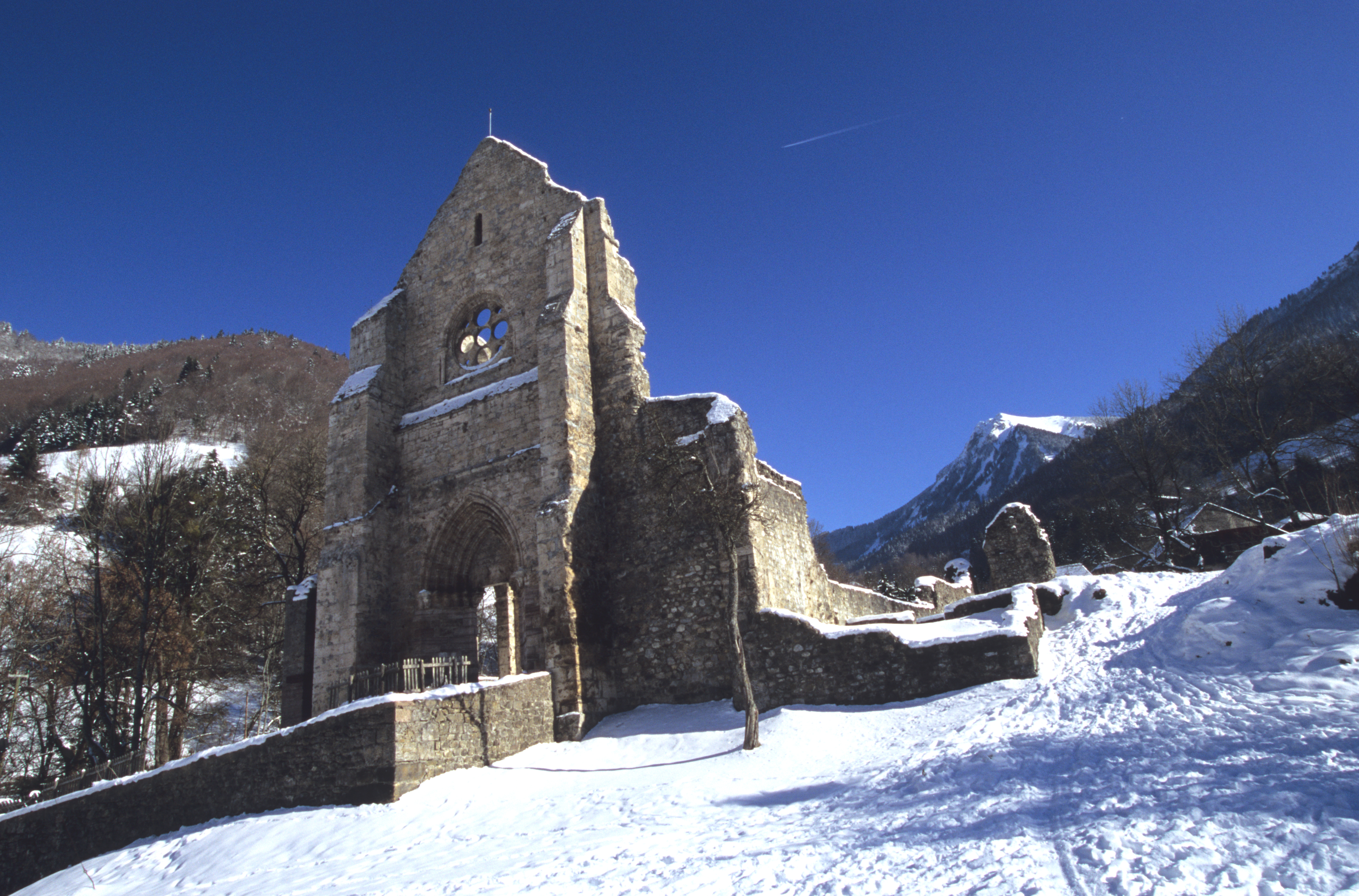
Aulps Abbey (Savoy)

- Abbaye-aux-Bois, nuns, diocese of Paris (1202–1792) (Rue de Sèvres and Rue de la Chaise, Paris, 1654–1792; founded 1202 as Notre-Dame-aux-Bois ("Our Lady of the Woods") at Ognolles, Oise, diocese of Noyon)
- Abbaye Blanche, see Blanche
- Abbaye nouvelle, see Gourdon
- Abondance Abbey, monks, diocese of Geneva (Feuillants: 1607-1761) (Abondance, Haute-Savoie)
- **Acey Abbey**, monks, diocese of Saint-Claude (extant; Cistercians 1136-1790; Trappists from 1873; priory 1873-1938, when restored to status of abbey) (Vitreux, Jura)
- **Aiguebelle Abbey**, monks, diocese of Saint-Paul-Trois-Châteaux (extant; 1137–1791; 1816 onwards) (Montjoyer, Drôme)
- Almanarre, see Lamanarre
- **Altbronn Abbey** (sometimes Ergersheim Abbey), nuns (Ergersheim, Bas-Rhin)
- L'Amour-Dieu Abbey, nuns, diocese of Châlons-sur-Marne (1232–1791) (Troissy, Marne)
- Ardorel Abbey (or Arborel Abbey), monks, diocese of Castres (Payrin-Augmontel, Tarn)
- Argensolles Abbey (or Argensoles Abbey), nuns, diocese of Soissons (1124-?) (Moslins, Marne)
- Arques Abbey, nuns, diocese of Rouen (Arques-la-Bataille, Seine-Maritime)
- Aubazine, see Obazine
- Aubepierre Abbey or Aube-Pierres Abbey, monks, diocese of Limoges (1149-?) (Méasnes, Creuse)
- Auberive Abbey, monks, diocese of Langres (Auberive, Haute-Marne)
- Aubignac Abbey, monks, diocese of Bourges (1162–1790) (Saint-Sébastien, Creuse)
- Aulps Abbey, monks, diocese of Geneva, later diocese of Annecy (from 1822) (1093–1792) (Saint-Jean-d'Aulps, Chablais, Haute-Savoie)
- Aumet Abbey, see Ulmet
- L'Aumône Abbey (known as the Petit-Cîteaux), monks, diocese of Chartres (1121–1622), later Blois (1697–1801) (1121-?) (La Colombe, Loir-et-Cher)
- Aunay-sur-Odon Abbey (also known as Aulnay Abbey), monks, diocese of Bayeux (1131-?) (Aunay-sur-Odon, Calvados)
- Ayes Abbey (also known as Les Hayes Abbey), nuns, diocese of Grenoble (Crolles, Isère)

== B ==
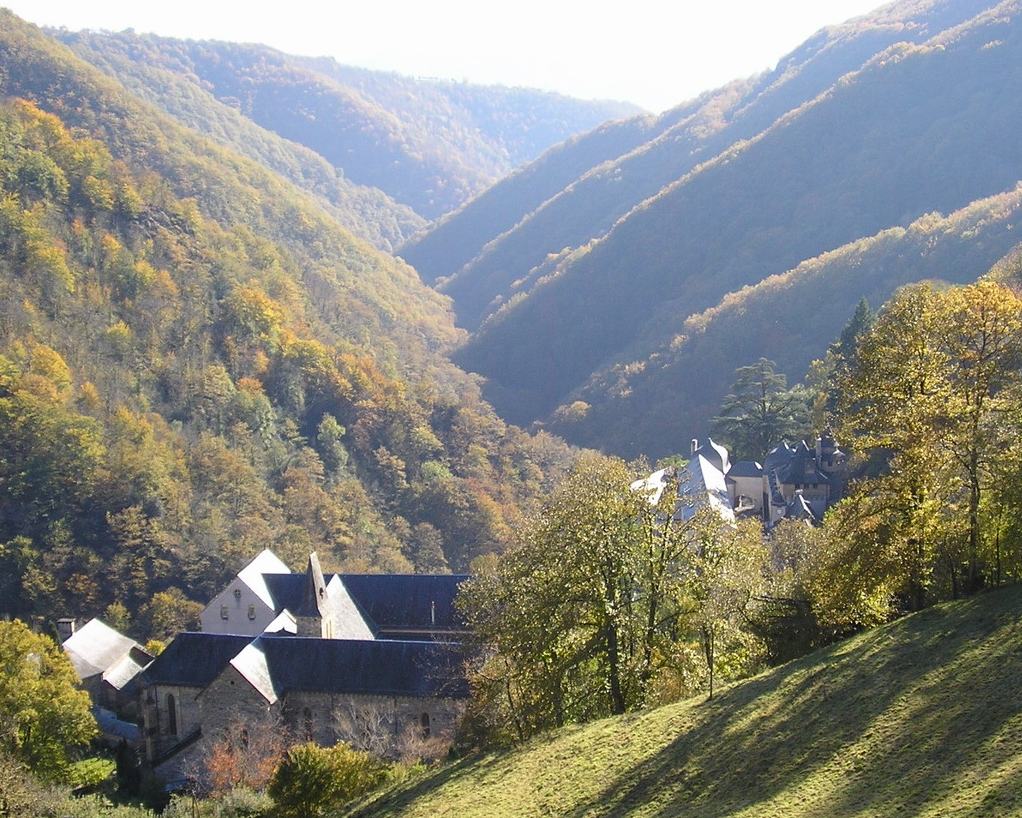
Bonneval Abbey (Aveyron)

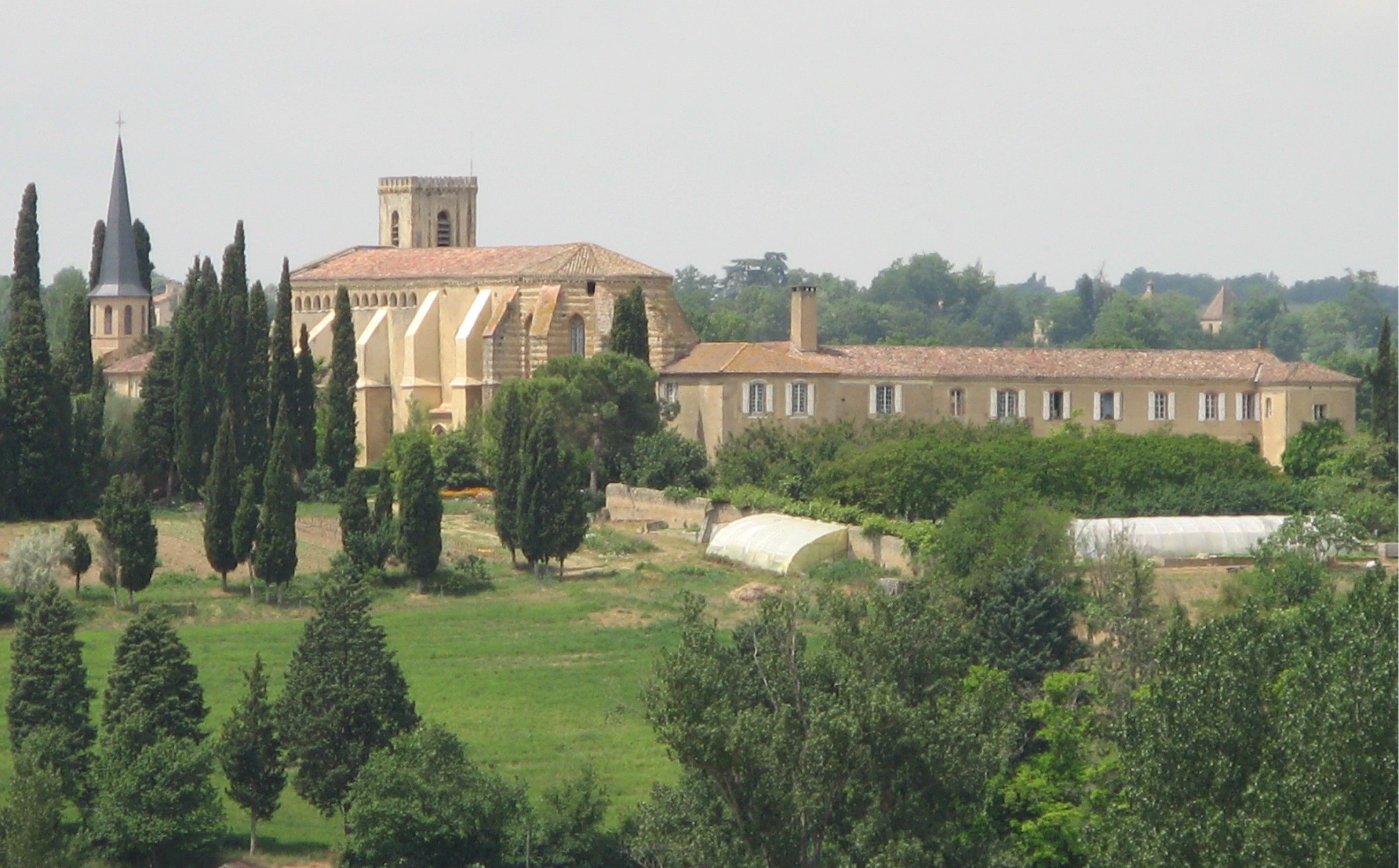
Boulaur Abbey (Gers)

- Balerne Abbey, in Franche-Comté, monks, diocese of Besançon, later diocese of Saint-Claude (Mont-sur-Monnet, Jura)
- Barbeau Abbey (also known as Barbeaux Abbey), monks, diocese of Sens (1147–1793) (Fontaine-le-Port, Seine-et-Marne)
- Barbery Abbey, monks, diocese of Bayeux (Barbery and Bretteville-sur-Laize, Calvados)
- Barzelle Abbey (also Barzelles Abbey), monks, diocese of Bourges (Poulaines, Indre)
- Battant Abbey, nuns, diocese of Besançon (Besançon, Doubs)
- Baumgarten Abbey, monks (1148-1525) (Bernardvillé, Bas-Rhin)
- Beaubec Abbey, monks, diocese of Rouen (Beaubec-la-Rosière, Seine-Maritime)
- Beaugerais Abbey, monks, diocese of Tours (Loché-sur-Indrois, Indre-et-Loire)
- Beaulieu Abbey, also Beaulieu-en-Bassigny Abbey, monks, diocese of Langres (Hortes, Haute-Amance, Haute-Marne)
- Beaulieu-en-Rouergue Abbey, also known as Belloc Abbey, monks, diocese of Rodez (Ginals, Tarn-et-Garonne)
- Beaupré Abbey, monks, diocese of Beauvais (1135-?1791) (Achy, Oise)
- Beaupré Abbey, diocese of Toul (1135–1790), later Nancy (Moncel-lès-Lunéville, Meurthe-et-Moselle)
- Beaupré Abbey (also known as Beaupré-sur-la-Lys Abbey), nuns, diocese of Saint-Omer (La Gorgue, Nord)
- Beauvoir Abbey, nuns, diocese of Bourges (Marmagne, Cher)
- Bégard Abbey, monks, diocese of Tréguier (Bégard, Côtes-d'Armor)
- Bellaigue Abbey, monks, diocese of Clermont (founded in 950 as a Benedictine priory, elevated to an abbey in 1136; Cistercian 1137-1791; re-founded as a Benedictine priory in 2000 (Virlet, Puy-de-Dôme)
- Belleau Abbey, from 1510 Belleau Priory (otherwise Belle Eau or Belle-Eau), nuns (Villeneuve-la-Lionne, Marne)
- Bellebranche Abbey, monks, diocese of Le Mans (Saint-Brice, Mayenne)
- Bellecombe Abbey, nuns, diocese of Le Puy (Yssingeaux, Haute-Loire)
- **Bellefontaine Abbey** (Abbaye Notre-Dame de Bellefontaine), Trappist monks (Bégrolles-en-Mauges, Maine-et-Loire)
- Belleperche Abbey, monks, diocese of Montauban (Cordes-Tolosannes, Tarn-et-Garonne)
- Bellevaux Abbey, monks, diocese of Besançon (Cirey, Haute-Saône)
- Belloc Abbey, see Beaulieu-en-Rouergues
- Belmont Abbey, nuns (Belmont, Haute-Marne)
- **Belval Abbey** (Abbaye Notre-Dame de Belval), nuns (formerly Troisvaux, Pas-de-Calais, now Saint Pol sur Ternoise)
- Bénisson-Dieu Abbey, nuns, diocese of Lyon (La Bénisson-Dieu, Loire)
- Bénisson-Dieu Abbey (also known as Nisors or Nizors Abbey), monks, diocese of Comminges (1184-?) (Boulogne-sur-Gesse, Haute-Garonne)
- Berdoues Abbey (also known as Berdouès Abbey), diocese of Auch (Berdoues, Gers)
- Le Betton Abbey, nuns, diocese of Maurienne (Betton-Bettonet, Savoie)
- Beuil Abbey, see Bœuil Abbey
- Biache Abbey, nuns, diocese of Noyon (Biache-Saint-Vaast, Pas-de-Calais)
- Billon Abbey or Buillon Abbey (Abbaye de Billon, Abbaye Notre-Dame de Billon, also de Buillon), monks, archdiocese of Besançon (Chenecey-Buillon, Doubs)
- Bithaine Abbey, monks, diocese of Besançon (Adelans-et-le-Val-de-Bithaine, Haute-Saône)
- Bival Abbey, nuns, diocese of Rouen (Nesle-Hodeng, Seine-Maritime)
- La Blanche en Noirmoutier Abbey, diocese of Luçon (Noirmoutier-en-l'Île, Vendée)
- Abbaye Blanche, sometimes Abbaye des Blanches, nuns, diocese of Avranches (Mortain, Manche)
- Blanche-Couronne Abbey (Abbaye Notre-Dame de Blanche-Couronne), monks (founded c. 1160, but apparently not Cistercian until later) diocese of Nantes (La Chapelle-Launay, Loire-Atlantique)
- **Blauvac Abbey** (Abbaye Notre-Dame de Bon Secours de Blauvac), nuns, diocese of Avignon (1927-) (Blauvac, Vaucluse)
- Blendecques Abbey (also known as Blandecques Abbey), nuns, diocese of Saint-Omer (Blendecques, Pas-de-Calais)
- Bœuil Abbey, also Beuil or Le Beuil Abbey (Abbaye de Bœuil, Abbaye Notre-Dame de Bœuil or Beuil), monks, diocese of Limoges (1123–1790) (Veyrac, Limousin)
- Bohéries Abbey, monks, diocese of Laon (Bohéries, later Vadencourt-et-Bohéries, nowadays Vadencourt, Aisne)
- Bois-Grolland Abbey, diocese of Luçon (Poiroux, Vendée)
- La Boissière Abbey, monks, diocese of Angers (Dénezé-sous-le-Lude, Maine-et-Loire)
- Bondeville Abbey, nuns, diocese of Rouen (priory to 1657, thereafter royal abbey to 1790) (Notre-Dame-de-Bondeville, Seine-Maritime)
- Bonlieu Abbey (also known as Carbonblanc Abbey), monks, diocese of Bordeaux (Carbon-Blanc, Gironde)
- Bonlieu Abbey, monks, diocese of Limoges (Peyrat-la-Nonière, Creuse)
- Bonlieu Abbey, nuns, diocese of Geneva (Sallenôves, Haute-Savoie)
- Bonlieu Abbey, nuns, diocese of Le Mans (Dissay-sous-Courcillon, Sarthe)
- Bonlieu Abbey, diocese of Valence (Bonlieu-sur-Roubion, Drôme)
- Bonlieu Abbey, nuns, diocese of Lyon (Sainte-Agathe-la-Bouteresse, Loire)
- Bonnaigue Abbey (sometimes Bonne-Aigue Abbey), monks, diocese of Limoges (Saint-Fréjoux, Corrèze)
- Bonnecombe Abbey, monks, diocese of Rodez (1166-1790; resettled by Trappist nuns 1876–1965) (Comps-la-Grand-Ville, Aveyron)
- Bonnecombe Abbey, nuns, diocese of Vienne (C12-1791) (Saint-Paul-d'Izeaux, Isère; from 1667 Beaurepaire, Isère)
- Bonnefont Abbey, monks, diocese of Comminges (Proupiary, Haute-Garonne)
- Bonnefontaine Abbey, monks, diocese of Reims (Blanchefosse, later Blanchefosse-et-Bay, Ardennes)
- **Bonneval Abbey** (Abbaye Notre-Dame de Bonneval), monks then nuns, diocese of Rodez (Espalion then Le Cayrol, Aveyron)
- Bonnevaux Abbey, monks, diocese of Poitiers (Marçay, Vienne)
- Bonnevaux Abbey, monks, diocese of Vienne (Saint-Jean-de-Bournay, Isère)
- Bonport Abbey, monks, diocese of Évreux (Pont-de-l'Arche, Eure)
- Bon-Repos Abbey, monks, diocese of Saint-Brieuc (Saint-Gelven, now Bon Repos sur Blavet, Côtes-d'Armor)
- Bonrepos or Bon-Repos, see Marquette
- Bons Abbey, also Bons-en-Bugey Abbey, nuns, diocese of Belley (Chazey-Bons, Ain)
- Boquen Abbey, monks, diocese of Saint-Brieuc (Plénée-Jugon, Côtes-d'Armor)
- Boschaud Abbey (also known as Bouchaud Abbey), diocese of Périgueux (Villars, Dordogne)
- Bouchet Abbey, also known as Le Bosquet Abbey (Abbaye de Bouchet, Abbaye Notre-Dame-du-Bosquet), nuns (founded c. 1146-50; Cistercian 1198-1408), diocese of Clermont (Bouchet, Drôme)
- Le Bouchet, see Le Bouschet-Vauluisant
- Bouillas Abbey, diocese of Auch (Sainte-Radegonde, Gers)
- Boulancourt Abbey, monks, diocese of Troyes (Longeville-sur-la-Laines, Haute-Marne)
- **Boulaur Abbey** (Abbaye Sainte-Marie de Boulaur), nuns (Boulaur, Gers)
- La Boulaye Abbey, monks (founded 1170 round a chapel founded c. 1134; transferred to form Torigny Abbey in 1308, leaving the original site as a small obscure priory) (Condé-sur-Vire, Manche)
- Boulbonne Abbey, monks, diocese of Mirepoix (Cintegabelle, Haute-Garonne)
- Bournet Abbey or Le Bournet Abbey (Abbaye Notre-Dame de l'Assomption du Bournet), monks (Benedictine 1113-1125, Cistercian 1125-15th century, Benedictine 15th century onwards) diocese of Angoulême (Courgeac, Charente)
- Bourras Abbey, monks, diocese of Auxerre (Saint-Malo-en-Donziois, Nièvre)
- Le Bouschet-Vauluisant Abbey, also Le Bouchet-Valluisant Abbey, monks (Yronde-et-Buron, Puy-de-Dôme)
- Brayelle-les-Aunoy Abbey or Brayelle Abbey, nuns, diocese of Cambrai (Annay-sous-Lens, Pas-de-Calais)
- Le Breuil-Benoît Abbey, monks, diocese of Évreux (Marcilly-sur-Eure, Eure)
- **Bricquebec Abbey** (Abbaye Notre-Dame-de-Grâce de Bricquebec), monks (abbey since 1836) (Bricquebec, Manche)
- Bueil Abbey, see Bœuil
- Buillon, see Billon
- La Bussière Abbey, monks, diocese of Autun (1130-French Revolution) (La Bussière-sur-Ouche, Côte-d'Or)
- Bussières Abbey, or Bussières-les-Nonains Abbey, nuns, diocese of Bourges (Saint-Désiré, Allier)
- Buzay Abbey, monks, diocese of Nantes (Rouans, Loire-Atlantique)

== C ==
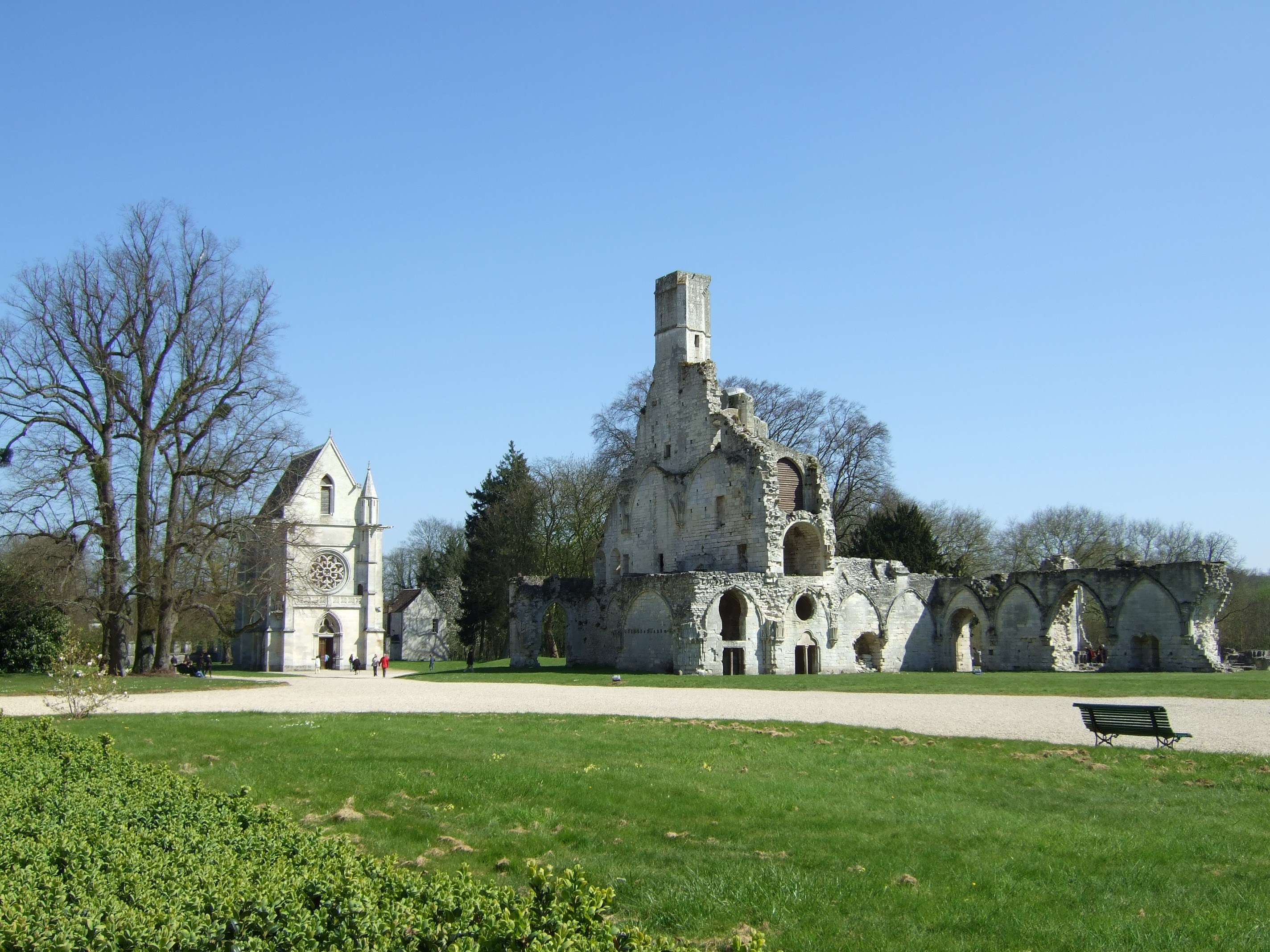
Chaalis Abbey (Oise)

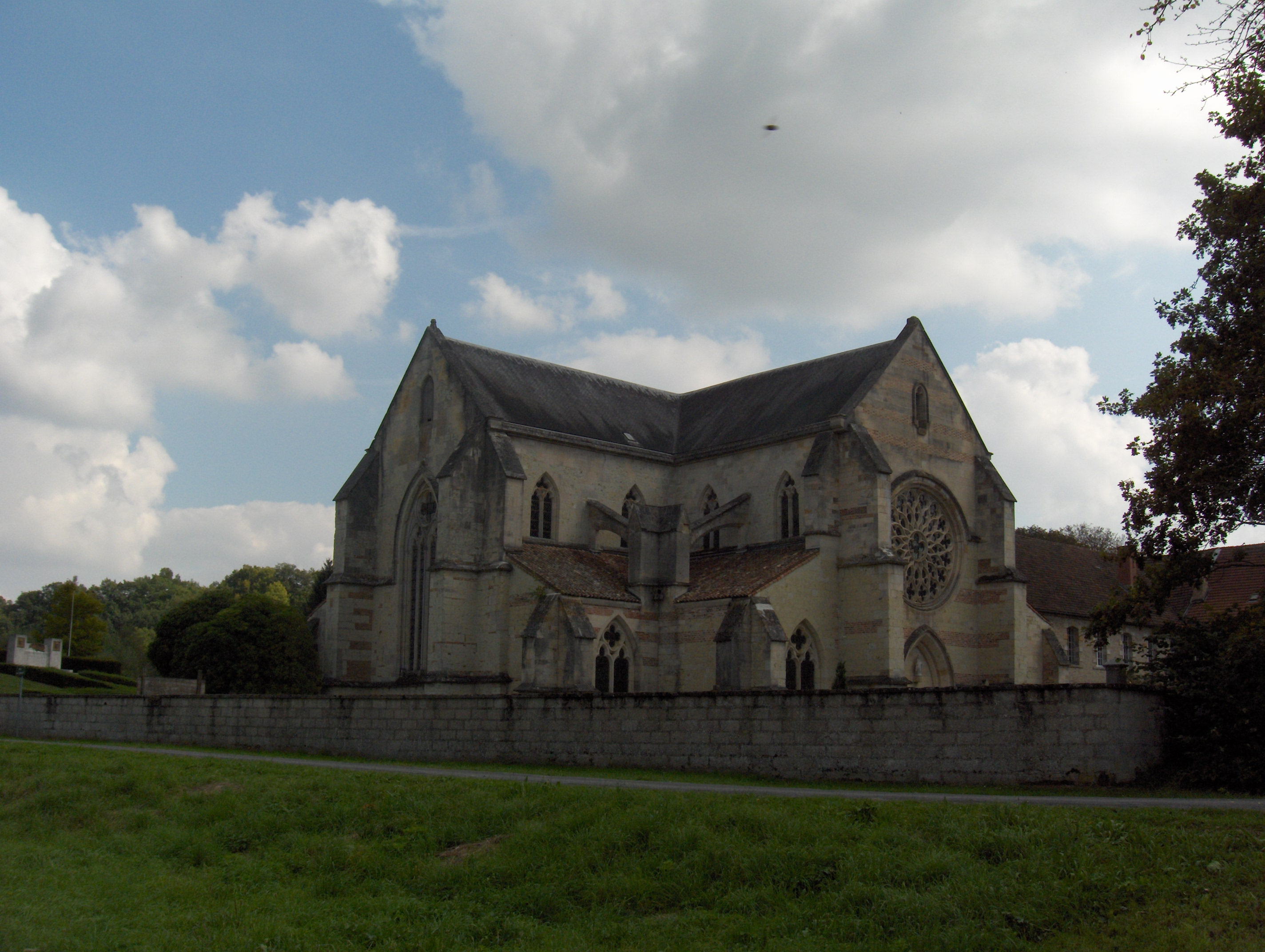
La Chalade Abbey (Meuse)

- Cadouin Abbey, monks, diocese of Sarlat (Le Buisson-de-Cadouin, Dordogne)
- Calers Abbey, monks, diocese of Rieux (Gaillac-Toulza, Haute-Garonne)
- Campénéac, see Abbey of la Joie-Notre-Dame de Campénéac
- Candeil Abbey, monks, diocese of Albi (1150 or 1152-1791) (Labessière-Candeil, Tarn)
- Carnoët Abbey (Abbaye Notre-Dame de Carnoët, latterly Abbaye Saint-Maurice de Carnoët), monks, diocese of Quimper (Clohars-Carnoët, Finistère)
- Carpentras Abbey, diocese of Carpentras
- **Castagniers Abbey** (Abbaye Notre-Dame de la Paix de Castagniers), nuns (1865-), diocese of Nice (Castagniers, Alpes-Maritimes)
- Celles-sur-Cher, see Selles
- Cercamp Abbey, monks, diocese of Amiens (Frévent, Pas-de-Calais)
- Cercanceaux Abbey, monks, diocese of Sens (Souppes-sur-Loing, Seine-et-Marne)
- Chaalis Abbey, monks, diocese of Senlis (Fontaine-Chaalis, Oise)
- La Chalade Abbey, diocese of Verdun (Lachalade, Meuse)
- Chalivoy Abbey or Chalivois Abbey, monks, diocese of Bourges (Herry, Cher)
- Chaloché Abbey, monks, diocese of Angers (Chaumont-d'Anjou and Corzé, Maine-et-Loire)
- **Chambarand Abbey** (Abbaye Notre-Dame de Chambarand), monks, then nuns (Roybon, Isère)
- Chambenoit Abbey or Priory, nuns (Poigny, Seine-et-Marne)
- Les Chambons Abbey, monks, diocese of Viviers, (Borne, Ardèche)
- Champagne Abbey, monks, diocese of Le Mans (1188-?) (Rouez-en-Champagne, Sarthe)
- Abbaye de la Charité, monks, diocese of Besançon
- Abbaye de la Charité-lès-Lézines, see Lézinnes
- La Charmoye Abbey or La Charmoie Abbey, monks, diocese of Châlons-sur-Marne (Montmort-Lucy, Marne)
- Charon Abbey or Charron Abbey diocese of La Rochelle (Charron, Charente-Maritime)
- Chassagne Abbey, monks, diocese of Lyon (Crans, Ain)
- Abbaye des Châteliers (or des Châtelliers): see Ré
- Châtillon Abbey (also known as Chastillon Abbey), diocese of Verdun (?-1791) (Pillon, Meuse)
- Chaumes, see Abbey of Saint-Léonard des Chaumes
- Cheminon Abbey, monks, diocese of Châlons-sur-Marne (Cheminon, Marne)
- Cherlieu Abbey, monks, diocese of Besançon (1131–1791) (Montigny-lès-Cherlieu, Haute-Saône)
- Chéry Abbey (also known as Chéhéry, or Chéery), monks, diocese of Reims (Chatel-Chéhéry, Ardennes)
- Chézery Abbey (also known as Chesery or Chézery-Mont-Sainte-Marie), monks, diocese of Belley, later diocese of Geneva, later diocese of Annecy (1140-?) (Chézery-Forens, Ain)
- **Cîteaux Abbey** (Abbaye Notre-Dame de Cîteaux) (Saint-Nicolas-lès-Cîteaux, Côte-d'Or)
- Clairefontaine Abbey (also known as Claire-Fontaine Abbey), monks, diocese of Besançon (Polaincourt-et-Clairefontaine, Haute-Saône)
- Les Clairets Abbey, nuns, diocese of Chartres (Mâle, Orne)
- Clairlieu Abbey, monks, diocese of Nancy (Villers-lès-Nancy, Meurthe-et-Moselle)
- Clairmarais Abbey, monks, diocese of Saint-Omer (Clairmarais, Pas-de-Calais)
- Clermont Abbey (also known as Clairmont Abbey), monks, diocese of Le Mans (1132–1794) (Olivet, since 1874 Port-Brillet, Mayenne)
- Clairvaux Abbey, monks, diocese of Langres (Ville-sous-la-Ferté, Aube)
- La Clarté-Dieu Abbey, monks, diocese of Tours (Saint-Paterne-Racan, Indre-et-Loire)
- Coëtmaloën Abbey, also Koad Malouen Abbey (Abbaye Notre-Dame de Coatmalouen, Abbaye Notre-Dame de Koad Malouen), monks, diocese of Quimper (Kerpert, Côtes-d'Armor)
- La Colombe Abbey, monks, diocese of Limoges (Tilly, Indre)
- **La Coudre Abbey** (Abbaye Notre-Dame de la Coudre), nuns (Laval, Mayenne)
- La Cour-Dieu Abbey, monks, diocese of Orléans (Ingrannes, Loiret)
- Coyroux Priory (also Coiroux), nuns, a dependent priory of Obazine Abbey, diocese of Limoges, later Tulle (Aubazine, Corrèze)
- La Crête Abbey (also known as La Creste Abbey), monks, diocese of Langres (Bourdons-sur-Rognon, Haute-Marne)
- Cuxa Abbey or Saint-Michel-de-Cuxa Abbey (also known as Cuixá Abbey) (1919–1965) (Codalet, Pyrénées-Orientales)

== D ==
- Dalon Abbey, monks, diocese of Limoges (Sainte-Trie, Dordogne)
- **Le Désert Abbey** (Abbaye du Désert or Abbaye Sainte-Marie du Désert), monks (1861-) (Bellegarde-Sainte-Marie, Haute-Garonne)
- Divielle Abbey (1869–1932), monks (Goos, Landes)
- Abbey of Notre-Dame des Dombes or Dombes Abbey (Abbaye Notre-Dame-des-Dombes), Trappist monks (1863–2001), afterwards taken over by the Community of the Chemin Neuf (Le Plantay, Ain)
- Droiteval Abbey, nuns (1128-?), later a priory of monks, diocese of Toul, later diocese of Saint-Dié (Claudon, Vosges)

== E ==
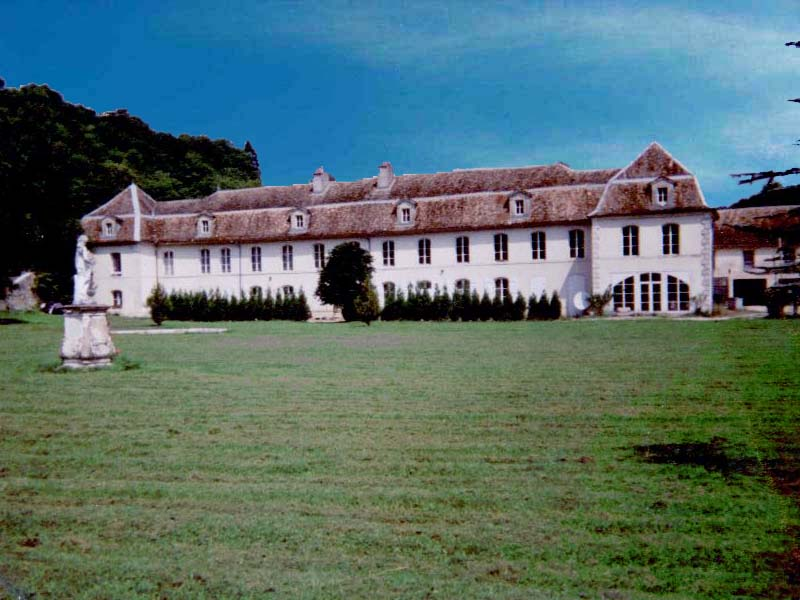
L'Étanche Abbey (Rollainville, Vosges)

- Eau Abbey (Abbaye Notre-Dame de l'Eau, Abbaye d'Eau-lès-Chartres), nuns, diocese of Chartres (Ver-lès-Chartres, Eure-et-Loir)
- Eaunes Abbey (Abbaye d'Eaunes, Abbaye de la Clarté-Dieu d'Eaunes), monks, diocese of Toulouse, (Eaunes, Haute-Garonne)
- Les Écharlis Abbey, also Les Escharlis Abbey (Abbaye des Écharlis or Escharlis), monks, diocese of Sens (Villefranche, Yonne)
- **Échourgnac Abbey** (Abbaye Notre-Dame de Bonne-Espérance d'Échourgnac), nuns (Échourgnac, Dordogne)
- L'Éclache Abbey, also L'Esclache Abbey (Abbaye de l'Éclache or l'Esclache), nuns, diocese of Clermont (Prondines, Puy-de-Dôme)
- Écurey Abbey, otherwise Escuray Abbey, monks, diocese of Toul (Écurey-en-Barrois, Montiers-sur-Saulx, Meuse)
- Élan Abbey, monks, diocese of Reims (Élan, Ardennes)
- Épagne Abbey, also Espagne Abbey (Abbaye d'Épagne or Espagne), nuns, diocese of Amiens (Épagne-Épagnette, Somme)
- L'Épau Abbey (also known as the Abbaye de la Piété-Dieu or de la Pitié-Dieu), monks, diocese of Le Mans (Le Mans, Sarthe)
- Escaladieu Abbey or **L'Escaladieu Abbey**, monks, diocese of Tarbes (Bonnemazon, Hautes-Pyrénées)
- Escharlis, see Écharlis
- L'Esclache, see L'Éclache
- Escuray, see Écurey
- Espagne, see Épagne
- Abbaye Notre-Dame d'Espérance, nuns, diocese of Dax
- Estanche, see L'Étanche
- L'Estrée Abbey (Abbaye Notre-Dame de l'Estrée, also Abbaye royale de l'Estrée), monks (founded 1140s), later nuns (1684-1791), diocese of Évreux (Muzy, Eure)
- L'Étanche Abbey (Abbaye Notre-Dame de L'Étanche), nuns, diocese of Toul (Rollainville, Vosges)
- L'Étoile Abbey (Abbaye Notre-Dame de l'Étoile), monks (Archigny, Vienne)

== F ==
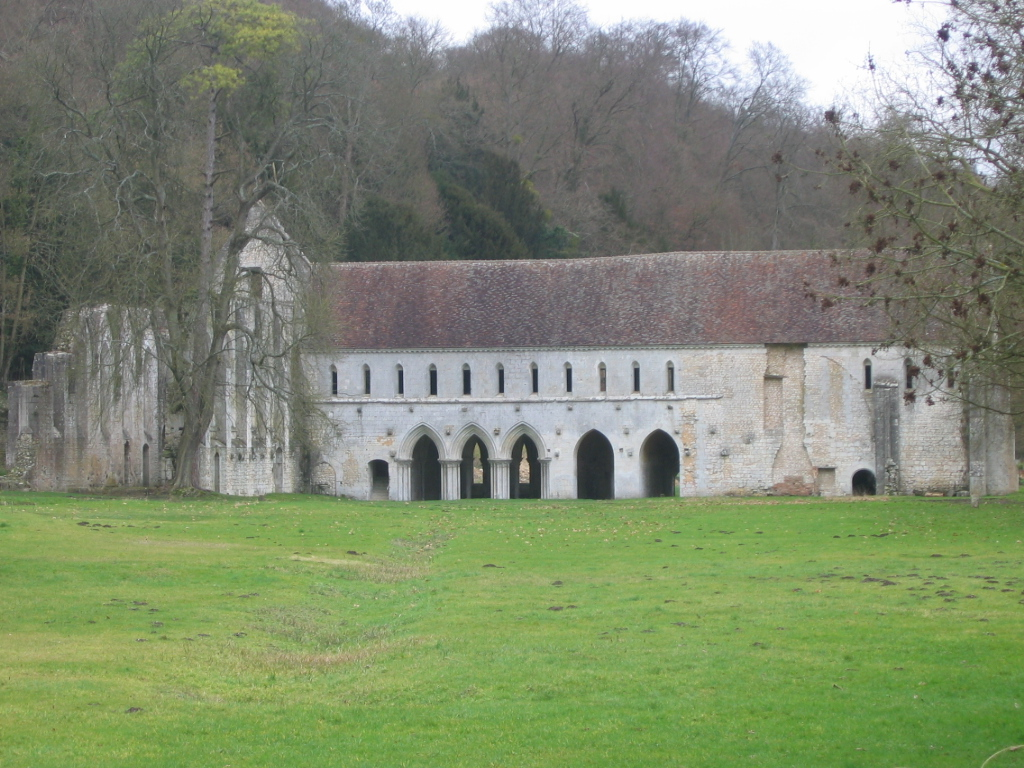
Fontaine-Guérard Abbey (Eure)

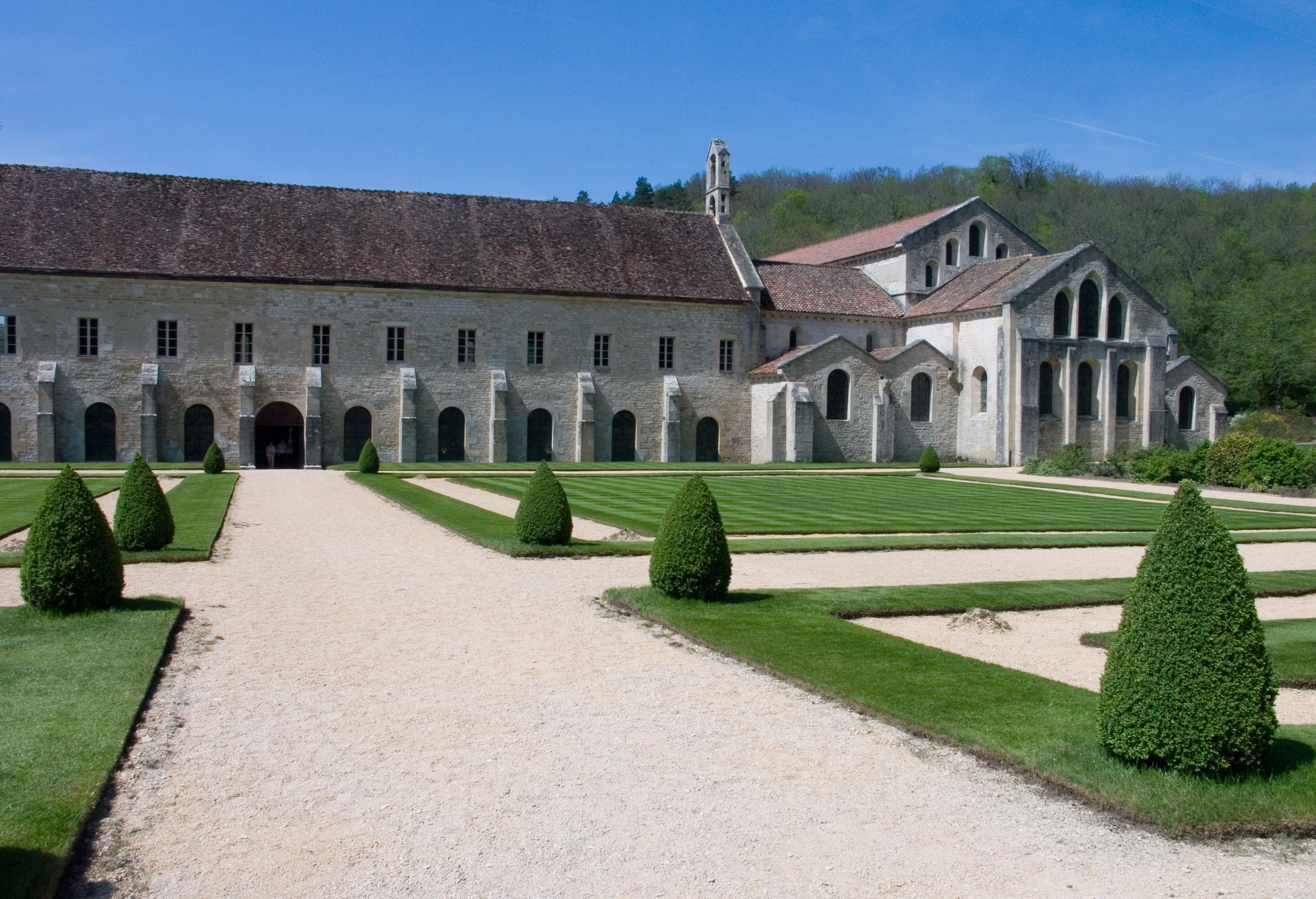
Fontenay Abbey (Côte-d'Or)

- Fabas Abbey, see La Lum-Dieu
- Faise Abbey, also La Faise Abbey (or La Faire Abbey), monks, diocese of Bordeaux (Les Artigues-de-Lussac, Gironde)
- Félipré Abbey, nuns (monks 1462-65) (Givet, Ardennes)
- Féniers Abbey or Feniers Abbey (also known as Le Val-Honnête Abbey or Le Vallonnette Abbey), monks, diocese of Clermont (Condat, Cantal)
- La Ferté Abbey (1113–1791) (La Ferté-sur-Grosne, Saint-Ambreuil, Saône-et-Loire)
- Fervaques Abbey (also known as Fontsomme or Fonsommes Abbey), nuns, diocese of Noyon, later diocese of Soissons (Fonsommes, Aisne)
- Les Feuillants Abbey (Abbaye Notre-Dame des Feuillants, des Feuillans or de Feuillant), diocese of Rieux, later diocese of Toulouse (Labastide-Clermont, Haute-Garonne)
- Flaran Abbey (Abbaye Notre-Dame de Flaran), monks, diocese of Auch (1151-?) (Valence-sur-Baïse, Gers)
- Flines Abbey, nuns, diocese of Arras (Flines-lez-Raches, Nord)
- Florièyes Abbey, also Florielle Abbey or Floriège Abbey, later a priory, monks, predecessor of Le Thoronet Abbey (1136–46, after which a priory of Le Thoronet; suppressed 1791) (Tourtour, Var)
- Foigny Abbey, monks, diocese of Laon (La Bouteille, Aisne)
- Font de Nîmes Abbey, nuns, diocese of Nîmes
- Font-aux-Nonnains Abbey, nuns, diocese of Alès
- Fontaine-Daniel Abbey, monks, diocese of Le Mans (Fontaine-Daniel, Saint-Georges-Buttavent commune, Mayenne)
- Fontaine-Guérard Abbey, nuns (Radepont, Eure)
- Fontainejean Abbey or Fontaine-Jean Abbey, monks, diocese of Sens, (Saint-Maurice-sur-Aveyron, Loiret)
- Fontaine-les-Blanches Abbey, monks (Autrèche, Indre-et-Loire)
- Fontenay Abbey, monks, diocese of Autun (Marmagne, Côte-d'Or)
- Fontenelle Abbey, nuns, diocese of Cambrai (1212-?) (Maing, Nord)
- Fontfroide Abbey (Abbaye Sainte-Marie de Fontfroide), monks, diocese of Narbonne (Narbonne, Aude)
- Fontguilhem Abbey, monks, diocese of Bazas, (Masseilles, Gironde)
- Fontmorigny Abbey, monks, diocese of Bourges (Menetou-Couture, Cher)
- Foucarmont Abbey, monks, diocese of Rouen (Foucarmont, Seine-Maritime)
- Franquevaux Abbey, monks, diocese of Nîmes (Beauvoisin, Gard)
- Freistroff Abbey, monks, diocese of Metz (Freistroff, Moselle)
- La Frenade Abbey, monks, diocese of Saintes (Merpins, Charente)
- Froidmont Abbey, monks, diocese of Beauvais (Hermes, Oise)

== G ==
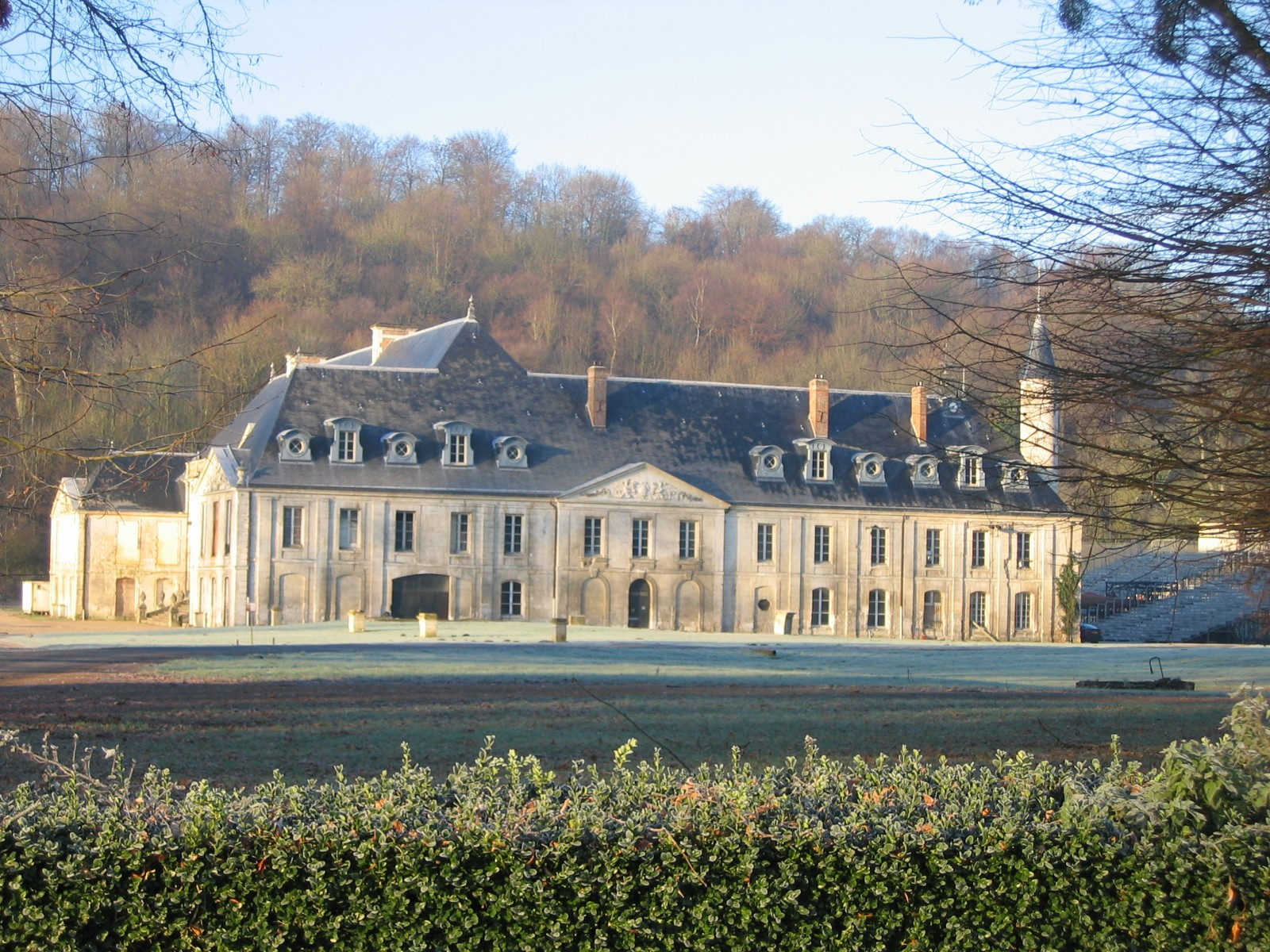
Gruchet-le-Valasse Abbey (Seine-Maritime)

- Le Gard Abbey (Abbaye Notre-Dame du Gard), monks, diocese of Amiens (Crouy-Saint-Pierre, Somme)
- La Garde-Dieu Abbey, monks, diocese of Cahors (Mirabel, Tarn-et-Garonne)
- **Les Gardes Abbey** (Abbaye Notre-Dame des Gardes), diocese of Angers, nuns (1818-) (Saint-Georges-des-Gardes, Maine-et-Loire)
- Gimont Abbey, see Planselve Abbey
- Gomerfontaine Abbey, nuns, diocese of Rouen, later diocese of Beauvais (1207–1792) (Trie-la-Ville, Oise)
- Gondon Abbey (Abbaye de Gondon, Abbaye Saint-Pierre de Gondon), monks, diocese of Agen (Gondon-les-Montastruc, Monbahus, Lot-et-Garonne)
- Gourdon Abbey (Abbaye de Gourdon, Abbaye de Léobard, or most commonly Abbaye nouvelle), monks, diocese of Cahors (Léobard, Lot)
- La Grâce-Dieu Abbey (Abbaye de la Grâce-Dieu), in Franche-Comté, monks (1139-1791, 1844–1909), later nuns (originally from Besançon, since 1927), diocese of Besançon (Chaux-lès-Passavant, Doubs)
- La Grâce-Dieu Abbey, diocese of La Rochelle
- La Grâce-Notre-Dame Abbey, nuns (Montmirail, Marne)
- Grandselve Abbey, monks, diocese of Toulouse (Bouillac, Tarn-et-Garonne)
- Grosbot Abbey (also known as Grosbos or Grosbois Abbey), diocese of Angoulême (Charras, Charente)
- Gruchet Abbey or Gruchet-le-Valasse Abbey (also known as Le Valasse Abbey) (Abbaye de Gruchet-le-Valasse or Abbaye Notre-Dame-du-Vœu de Gruchet-le-Valasse) (Gruchet-le-Valasse, Seine-Maritime)

== H ==
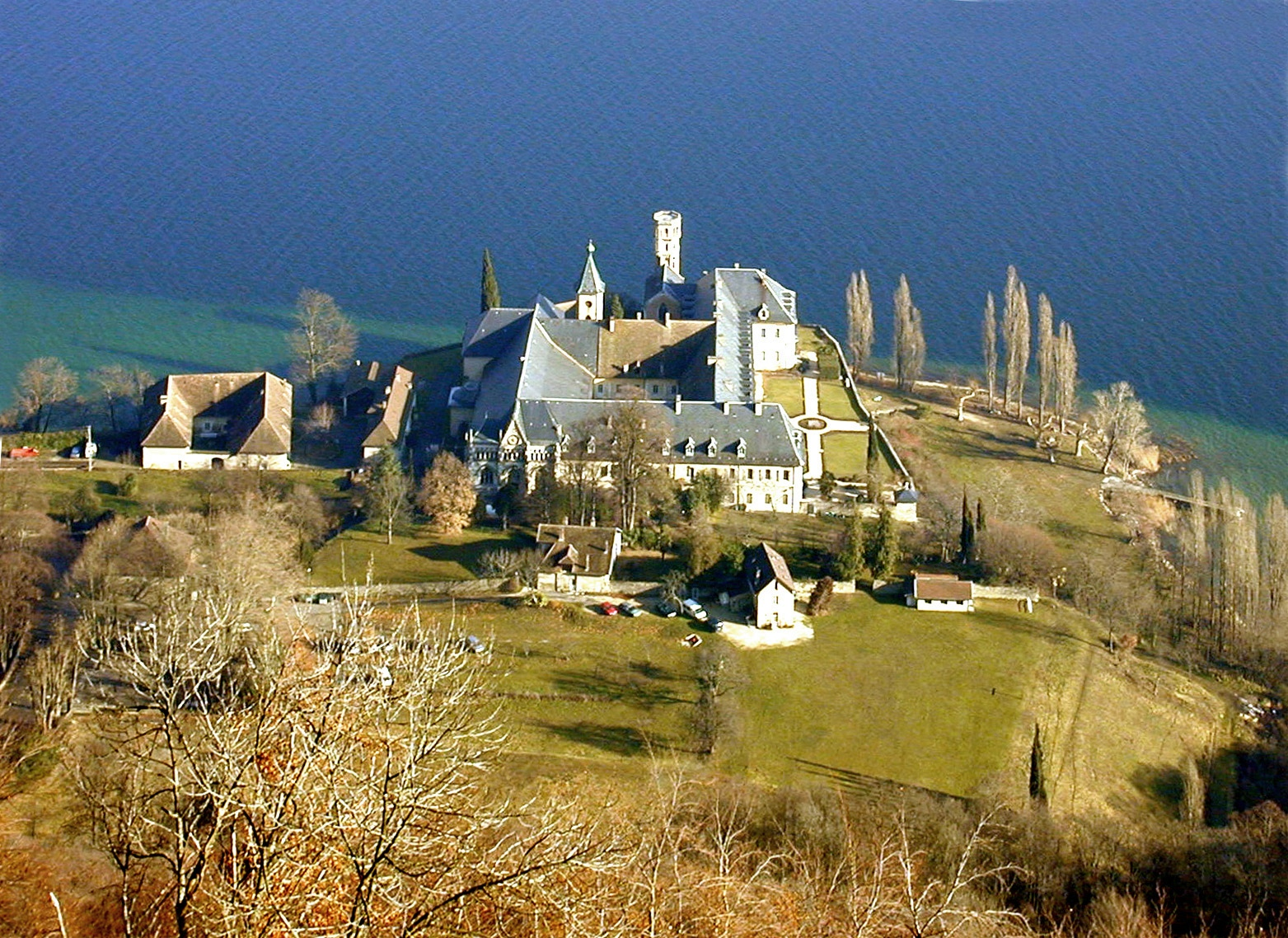
Hautecombe Abbey

- Hautecombe Abbey (1135-?; ?-1826) (Saint-Pierre-de-Curtille, Savoie)
- Haute-Fontaine or Hautefontaine Abbey, monks, diocese of Châlons-sur-Marne (Ambrières, Marne)
- Haute-Seille Abbey, diocese of Nancy (1140–1791) (Cirey-sur-Vezouze, Meurthe-et-Moselle)
- Hayes, see Ayes

== I ==
- Igny Abbey (Abbaye Notre-Dame d'Igny), monks (1128-French Revolution; 1878–1903), later nuns (from 1929), diocese of Reims (Arcis-le-Ponsart, Marne)
- L'Isle-en-Barrois Abbey, monks, diocese of Toul (Lisle-en-Barrois, Meuse)
- Les Isles Abbey, nuns, diocese of Auxerre

== J ==
- Jau Abbey, also Clariana Abbey (Abbaye de Jau, Abbaye Sainte-Marie de Jau, Abbaye Sainte-Marie de Clariane, Santa Maria de Clariana), monks, diocese of Perpignan (Col de Jau, Mosset, Pyrénées-Orientales)
- La Joie Abbey or Abbey of Notre-Dame-de-la-Joie (Abbaye de la Joie, Abbaye Notre-Dame-de-la-Joye), nuns, diocese of Vannes (1252–1792) (Hennebont, Morbihan)
- Abbey of La Joie-lès-Nemours (Abbaye de la Joie-lès-Nemours, Abbaye Notre-Dame de la Joie, Abbaye Sainte-Marie-lès-Nemours, Abbaye Notre-Dame de la Saussaie), nuns, diocese of Sens (1231–1751) (Saint-Pierre-lès-Nemours, Seine-et-Marne)
- Abbey of La Joie-Notre-Dame (Abbaye de la Joie-Notre-Dame de Campénéac), nuns, diocese of Vannes (founded 1953, as successor to the Abbey of Notre-Dame de Bonne-Garde at Sainte-Anne-d'Auray, founded 1920) (Campénéac, Morbihan)
- Jouy Abbey, monks, diocese of Sens, later Meaux (Chenoise, Seine-et-Marne)

== K ==
- Kerlot Abbey (Abbaye de Kerlot, Abbaye Notre-Dame de Kerlot), nuns, diocese of Quimper (Plomelin, Finistère)
- Koenigsbruck Abbey, nuns, diocese of Strasbourg (1140–1793) (Leutenheim, Bas-Rhin)

== L ==
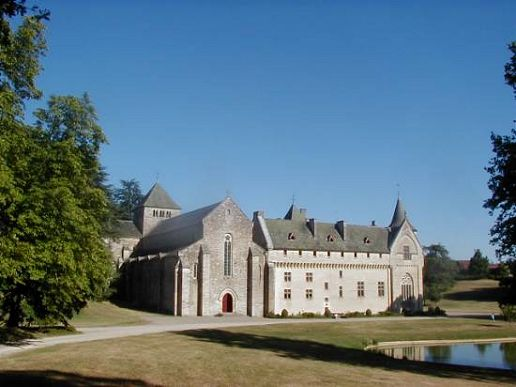
Loc-Dieu Abbey (Aveyron)

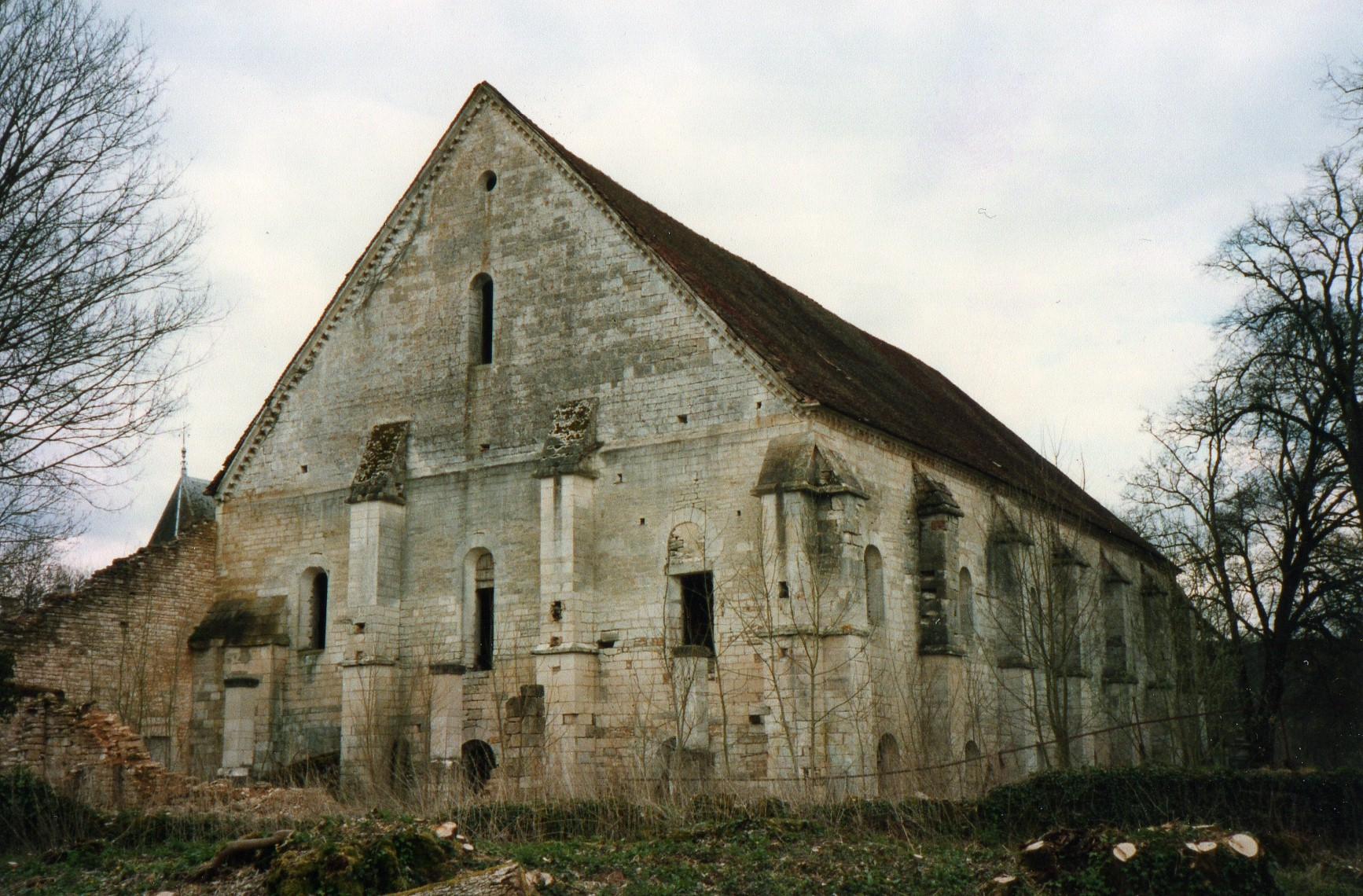
Longuay Abbey (Haute-Marne)

- Lachalade Abbey, see Chalade
- Lamanarre Abbey or Almanarre Abbey (also known as Hyères Abbey), nuns, diocese of Toulon (Hyères, Var)
- Le Landais Abbey (Abbaye Notre-Dame du Landais), monks, diocese of Bourges (Frédille, Indre)
- Langonnet Abbey, monks, diocese of Quimper, later Vannes (Langonnet, Morbihan)
- Lannoy Abbey (previously known as Briostel Abbey or Briotel Abbey), monks, diocese of Beauvais (Écorchevache, Briot, Oise; Roy-Boissy, Oise)
- Lanvaux Abbey, monks, diocese of Vannes (Brandivy, Morbihan)
- Larivour Abbey (also Larrivour, La Rivour or l'Arivour) (Abbaye Notre-Dame de Larivour, Larrivour, la Rivour or l'Arivour), monks, diocese of Troyes (Lusigny-sur-Barse, Aube)
- Lasteron Abbey or Lasteyron Abbey (Abbaye Saint-Bernard de Lasteron or Lasteyron; Abbaye Saint-Bernard de Bayonne), nuns, diocese of Dax (Mouguerre, moved to Bayonne, Pyrénées-Atlantiques)
- Lazières Abbey, nuns, diocese of Cahors (Montamel, Lot)
- Léoncel Abbey, monks, diocese of Die (Léoncel, Drôme)
- **Lérins Abbey** (Abbaye Notre-Dame de Lérins) (Île Saint-Honorat, Cannes, Alpes-Maritimes)
- Leyme Abbey (also known as Lerme Abbey or La Grâce-Dieu Abbey), nuns, diocese of Cahors (1220-?) (Leyme, Lot)
- Lézinnes Abbey (Abbaye de la Charité-lès-Lézines), nuns, then monks (1432), diocese of Langres (1184-?) (Lézinnes, Yonne)
- Lieu-Croissant Abbey, monks, diocese of Besançon (Geney, Doubs)
- Le Lieu-Dieu Abbey, nuns, diocese of Autun
- Le Lieu-Dieu Abbey, monks, diocese of Amiens
- Le Lieu-Notre-Dame Abbey, nuns, diocese of Lyon
- Le Lieu-Notre-Dame Abbey (Abbaye Notre-Dame du Lieu), nuns, diocese of Orléans (Romorantin-Lanthenay, Loir-et-Cher)
- Lissac Priory, dependent on Leyme Abbey, nuns, diocese of Cahors (1286-?) (Lissac-et-Mouret, Lot)
- Loc-Dieu Abbey, monks, diocese of Rodez (Martiel, Aveyron)
- Longpont Abbey (Abbaye Notre-Dame de Longpont), monks, diocese of Soissons (Longpont, Aisne)
- Longuay Abbey (also Longué Abbey), monks, diocese of Langres (1149–1790) (Aubepierre-sur-Aube, Haute-Marne)
- Longvillers Abbey, also Longvilliers Abbey, monks, diocese of Boulogne-sur-Mer (Longvilliers, Pas-de-Calais)
- Loos Abbey (also Looz Abbey) (Abbaye Notre-Dame de Loos or de Looz), monks, diocese of Tournai (1149-?) (Loos, Nord)
- Loroy Abbey (also Lorroy or Lorois Abbey) in Berry, monks, diocese of Bourges (Méry-ès-Bois, Cher)
- Louroux Abbey (also Le Louroux Abbey), monks, diocese of Angers (Vernantes, Maine-et-Loire)
- Lucelle Abbey (also Lützel Abbey), monks, diocese of Basle (1124–1790) (Lucelle, Haut-Rhin and Pleigne in Switzerland)
- La Lum-Dieu Abbey or La Lumière-Dieu Abbey, also known as Fabas Abbey, nuns, diocese of Comminges (Fabas, Haute-Garonne)
- Lützel Abbey, see Lucelle Abbey
- Le Lys Abbey (Abbaye du Lys or Abbaye royale du Lys), nuns, diocese of Sens (Dammarie-les-Lys, Seine-et-Marne)

== M ==
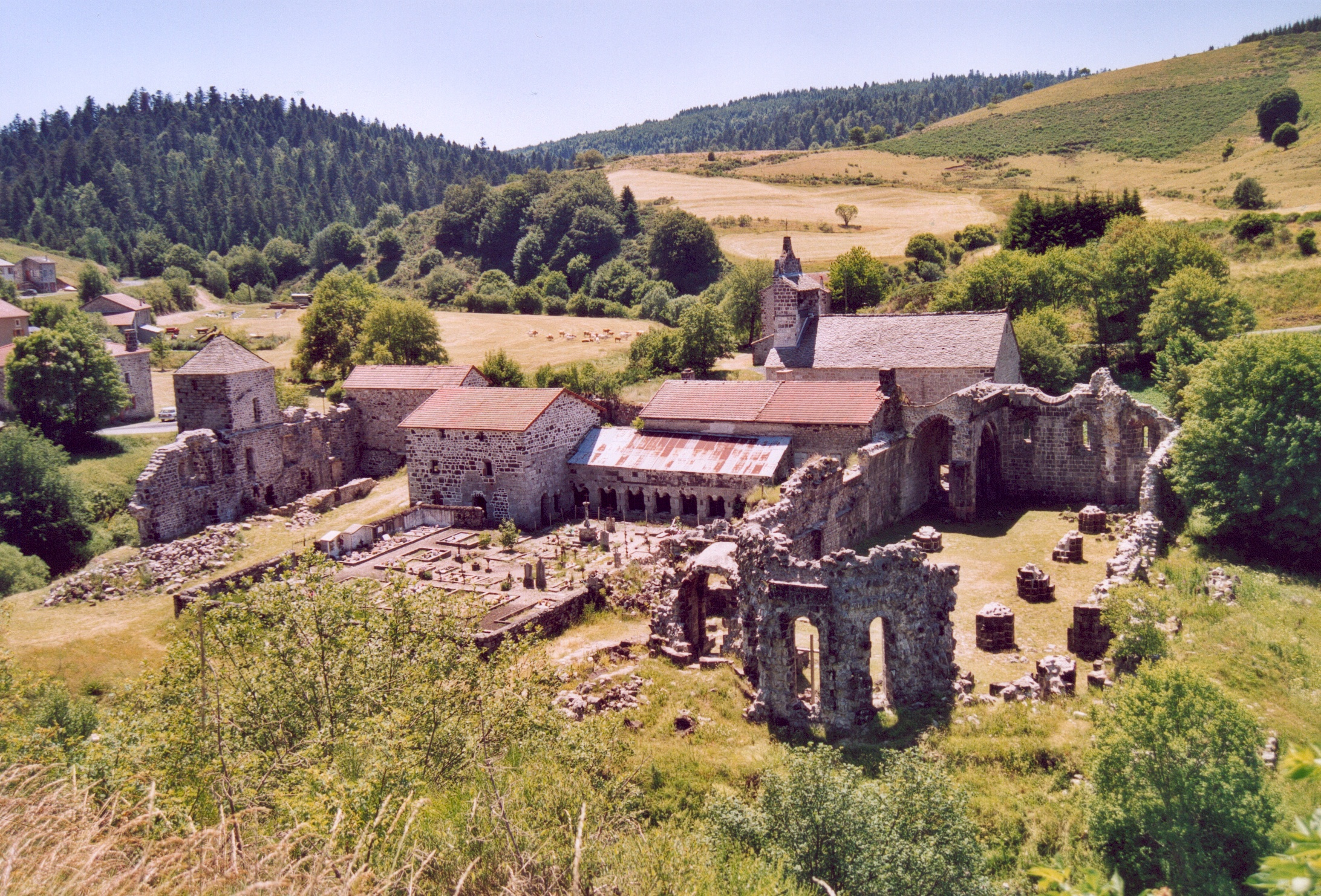
Mazan Abbey (Ardèche)

- Maizières Abbey, monks, diocese of Chalon-sur-Saône (Saint-Loup-Géanges, Saône-et-Loire)
- Marcilly Abbey (Abbaye de Marcilly, Abbaye Notre-Dame de Marcilly), monks, diocese of Autun (Provency, Yonne)
- Marquette Abbey (Abbaye du Repos de Notre-Dame de Marquette, Abbaye du Bon-repos de Notre-Dame de Marquette, Abbaye du Réclinatoire de Notre-Dame de Marquette) nuns, diocese of Tournai (Marquette-lez-Lille, Nord)
- Maubuisson Abbey (Abbaye de Maubuisson or Abbaye Notre-Dame la Royale de Maubuisson), nuns, diocese of Rouen, later diocese of Paris (1236-?) (Saint-Ouen-l'Aumône, Val d'Oise)
- Mazan Abbey, monks, diocese of Viviers (Mazan-l'Abbaye, Ardèche)
- Mègemont Abbey, nuns, later monks, diocese of Clermont (Chassagne, Puy-de-Dôme)
- **Melleray Abbey** (Abbaye Notre-Dame de Melleray), monks, diocese of Nantes (La Meilleraye-de-Bretagne, Loire-Atlantique)
- Merci-Dieu Abbey, monks, diocese of Poitiers (La Roche-Posay, Vienne)
- Mercoire Abbey, nuns, diocese of Mende (Cheylard-l'Évêque, Lozère)
- Micy Abbey or Saint Mesmin's Abbey, Micy (Abbaye Saint-Mesmin de Micy) (Feuillants : 1622-1791) (Saint-Pryvé-Saint-Mesmin, Loiret)
- Le Miroir Abbey (Abbaye Notre-Dame du Miroir), monks, diocese of Lyon (Le Miroir, Saône-et-Loire)
- Molaise Abbey, otherwise Molèze Abbey, nuns, diocese of Chalon-sur-Saône (Molaise in Écuelles, Saône-et-Loire)
- Mollégès Abbey, otherwise Mologèze Abbey (Abbaye Notre-Dame de Mollégès or Mologèze), nuns, diocese of Arles (Mollégès, Bouches-du-Rhône)
- Moncé Abbey, nuns, diocese of Tours (Limeray, Indre-et-Loire)
- Monstier-en-Argonne, see Monthiers-en-Argonne
- **Mont des Cats Abbey** (Abbaye du Mont des Cats or Abbaye Sainte-Marie du Mont des Cats), monks (Godewaersvelde, Nord)
- Mont-Sainte-Marie Abbey, monks, diocese of Besançon (Labergement-Sainte-Marie, Doubs)
- Monthiers-en-Argonne Abbey, otherwise Monstier-en-Argonne Abbey, monks, diocese of Châlons-sur-Marne (Possesse, Marne)
- Mount Zion Abbey (Abbaye du Mont de Sion), nuns, diocese of Marseille (Marseille, Bouches-du-Rhône)
- Montpeyroux Abbey, monks, diocese of Clermont (Puy-Guillaume, Puy-de-Dôme)
- Montreuil Abbey (Abbaye de Montreuil-les-Dames or Montreuil-en-Thiérache, later Montreuil-sous-Laon), nuns, diocese of Laon (Laon, Aisne)
- Moreilles Abbey (also Moreil Abbey), diocese of La Rochelle (Moreilles, Vendée)
- Mores Abbey (Abbaye de Mores or Abbaye Notre-Dame de Mores), monks, diocese of Langres (Celles-sur-Ource, Aube)
- Morimond Abbey, monks, diocese of Langres (formerly Fresnoy-en-Bassigny, now Parnoy-en-Bassigny, Haute-Marne)
- Mortemer Abbey, monks, diocese of Rouen (Lisors, Eure)
- Mouchy-le-Péreux Abbey, otherwise Monchy-le-Péreux or Monchy-le-Preux Abbey, nuns, later monks, later nuns again, diocese of Beauvais (Monchy-Humières, Oise)

== N ==
- **Abbey of Notre-Dame des Neiges**, otherwise **Our Lady of the Snows** (Abbaye Notre-Dame-des-Neiges), monks (Saint-Laurent-les-Bains, Ardèche)
- Netlieu Abbey, nuns, diocese of Agde (1195-?) (Mèze, Hérault)
- Neubourg Abbey (Abbaye de Neubourg or du Neubourg), monks, diocese of Strasbourg (c. 1130-c.1790) (Neubourg in Dauendorf, Bas-Rhin)
- La Noë Abbey (Abbaye de la Noë), monks, diocese of Évreux (La Bonneville-sur-Iton, Eure)
- Noirlac Abbey (Abbaye Notre-Dame de Noirlac or Abbaye de la Maison-Dieu), monks, diocese of Bourges (Bruère-Allichamps, Cher)
- Nonenque Abbey, now **Nonenque Charterhouse** (Chartreuse de Nonenque), nuns, diocese of Vabres (1139–1791) (Marnhagues-et-Latour, Aveyron); reoccupied in 1927 by the Carthusians
- Nuwenburg Abbey, see Neubourg Abbey

== O ==
- Obazine Abbey (also Aubazine Abbey), monks, diocese of Limoges (Aubazine, Corrèze)
- **Oelenberg Abbey** (Abbaye Notre-Dame d'Oelenberg), monks (Reiningue, Haut-Rhin)
- Les Olives Abbey (also Les Olieux Abbey), nuns, diocese of Narbonne (founded 1204, abandoned 1614; replaced in the 19th century by the Abbaye des Monges) (Narbonne, Aude)
- Olivet Abbey (Abbaye Notre-Dame d'Olivet), monks, diocese of Bourges (Saint-Julien-sur-Cher, Cher
- Ounans Abbey (Abbaye Notre-Dame d'Ounans), nuns, diocese of Besançon (Ounans, Jura)
- Ourscamp Abbey (Abbaye Notre-Dame d'Ourscamp), monks, diocese of Noyon (Chiry-Ourscamp, Oise)

== P ==
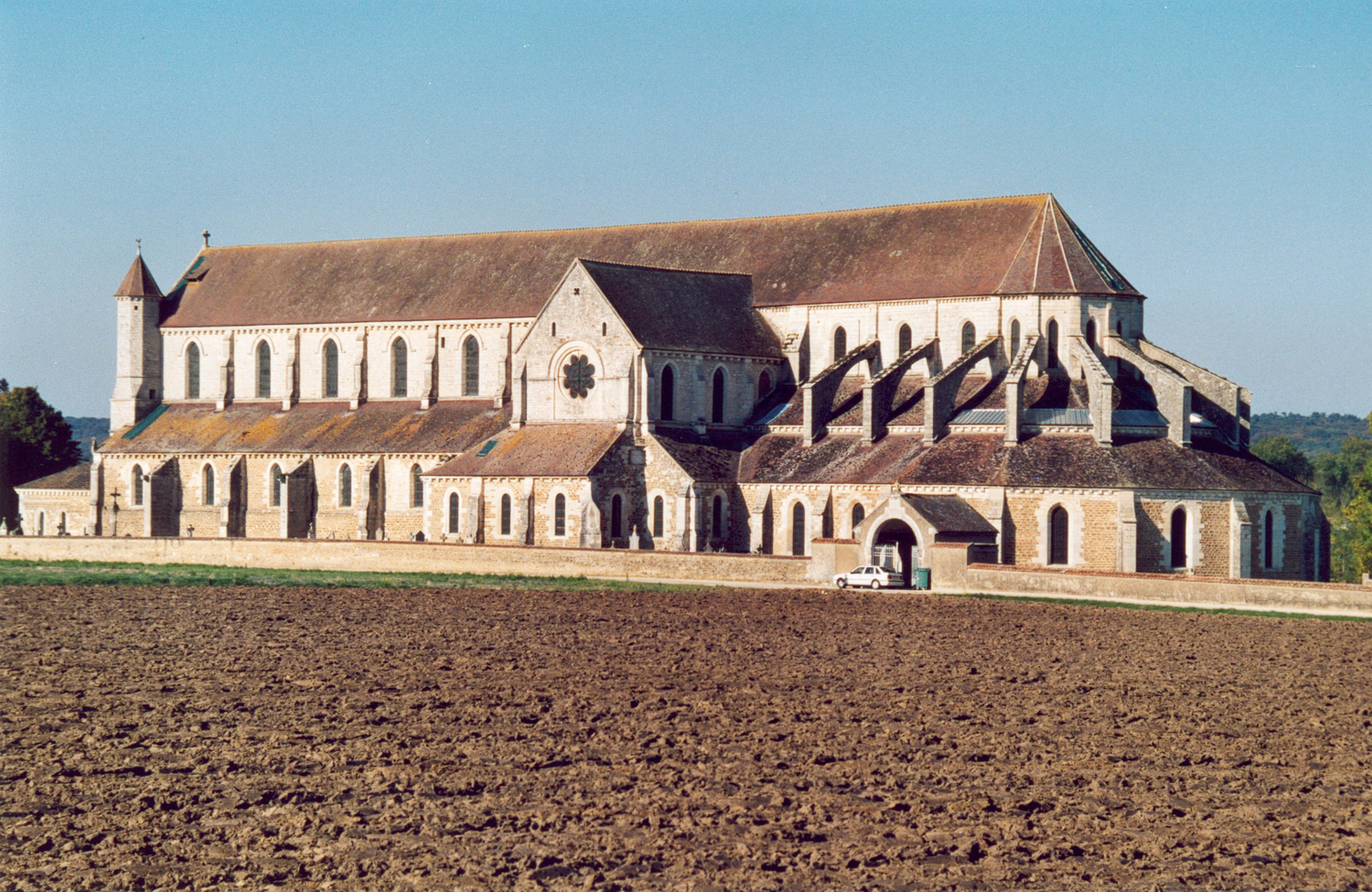
Pontigny Abbey (Yonne)

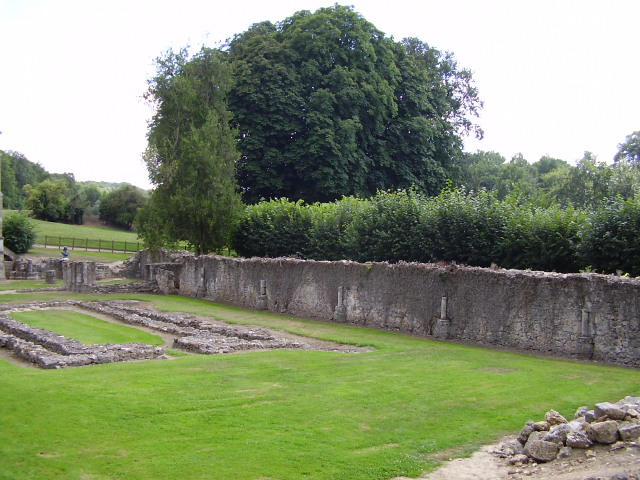
Site of Port-Royal-des-Champs (Yvelines)

- Pairis Abbey, monks, diocese of Basle, later diocese of Strasbourg (1138-1791) (Orbey, Haut-Rhin)
- Palais-Notre-Dame Abbey (Abbaye du Palais-Notre-Dame, Abbaye Notre-Dame du Palais), monks, diocese of Limoges (1162-1791) (Thauron, Creuse)
- Pantemont, see Pentemont Abbey
- Abbey of the Paraclete (Abbaye du Paraclet des Champs), nuns, diocese of Amiens (1218-1790) (Cottenchy, Somme)
- Le Parc-aux-Dames Abbey, nuns, diocese of Senlis
- Pentemont Abbey (Abbaye de Pentemont, also Abbaye de Penthemont, Panthemont or Pantemont), nuns, diocese of Paris (1217-1790) (Paris, 7th arrondissement)
- Pérignac or Peyrignac Abbey, monks, diocese of Agen (1151-1791) (Montpezat, Lot-et-Garonne)
- Le Perray-aux-Nonnains Abbey, nuns, diocese of Angers (Benedictines 1180-1248; Cistercians 1248-1790) (Écouflant, Maine-et-Loire)
- Perseigne Abbey, monks, diocese of Le Mans (1145-1791) (Neufchâtel-en-Saosnois, Sarthe)
- Monastère Notre Dame des Petites Roches, nuns (Saint Bernard du Touvet, Isère
- La Peyrouse Abbey, diocese of Périgueux
- Les Pierres Abbey (Abbaye Notre-Dame des Pierres), monks, diocese of Bourges (1149?-1791) (Sidiailles, Cher)
- Le Pin Abbey, diocese of Poitiers (1163-?) (Béruges, Vienne)
- La Pitié-Dieu Abbey or La Piété-Dieu Abbey (Abbaye de la Pitié-Dieu-lès-Ramerupt or Abbaye de la Piété-Dieu), monks, diocese of Troyes (1440–1791) (Ramerupt, Aube)
- Planselve Abbey, also Gimont Abbey (Abbaye Notre-Dame de Planselve, de Gimont) (Gimont, Gers)
- Le Pont-aux-Dames Abbey (Abbaye du Pont-aux-Dames), nuns, diocese of Meaux (Couilly-Pont-aux-Dames, Seine-et-Marne)
- Pontaut Abbey (also Pontault Abbey), diocese of Aire (1151-?) (Mant, Landes)
- Pontifroy Abbey (Abbaye Notre-Dame de Pontifroy) (1323–1740) (Metz, Moselle)
- Pontigny Abbey, monks, diocese of Auxerre (Pontigny, Yonne)
- Pontron Abbey (or Pontrond Abbey), monks, diocese of Angers (1134-?) (Le Louroux-Béconnais, Maine-et-Loire)
- Port-Royal-des-Champs (Abbaye de Port-Royal-des-Champs), nuns, diocese of Paris (?-1707) (Magny-les-Hameaux, Yvelines)
- Port-Royal (Abbaye de Port-Royal de Paris), nuns, diocese of Paris (1625–1790) (Paris)
- Port-du-Salut Abbey (Abbaye du Port du-Salut, Abbaye Notre-Dame du Port du Salut d'Entrammes, or Abbaye du Port-Ringeard), Trappist monks (1816-) (Entrammes, Mayenne)
- Prébenoît Abbey (Abbaye de Prébenoît or Abbaye Notre-Dame de Prébenoît), monks, diocese of Limoges (Bétête, Creuse)
- La Prée Abbey (Abbaye Notre-Dame de la Prée), monks, diocese of Bourges (Ségry, Indre)
- Les Prés Abbey (Abbaye des Prés), nuns, diocese of Cambrai (Douai, Nord)
- Les Prés Abbey (Abbaye Notre-Dame des Prés), nuns, diocese of Troyes (Saint-André-les-Vergers, Aube)
- Preuilly Abbey, monks (Égligny, Seine-et-Marne)
- Prières Abbey (Abbaye Notre-Dame de Prières), monks, diocese of Vannes (Billiers, Morbihan)

== Q ==
- Quincy Abbey (or Quincey Abbey), monks, diocese of Langres (Commissey, now Tanlay, Yonne)

== R ==
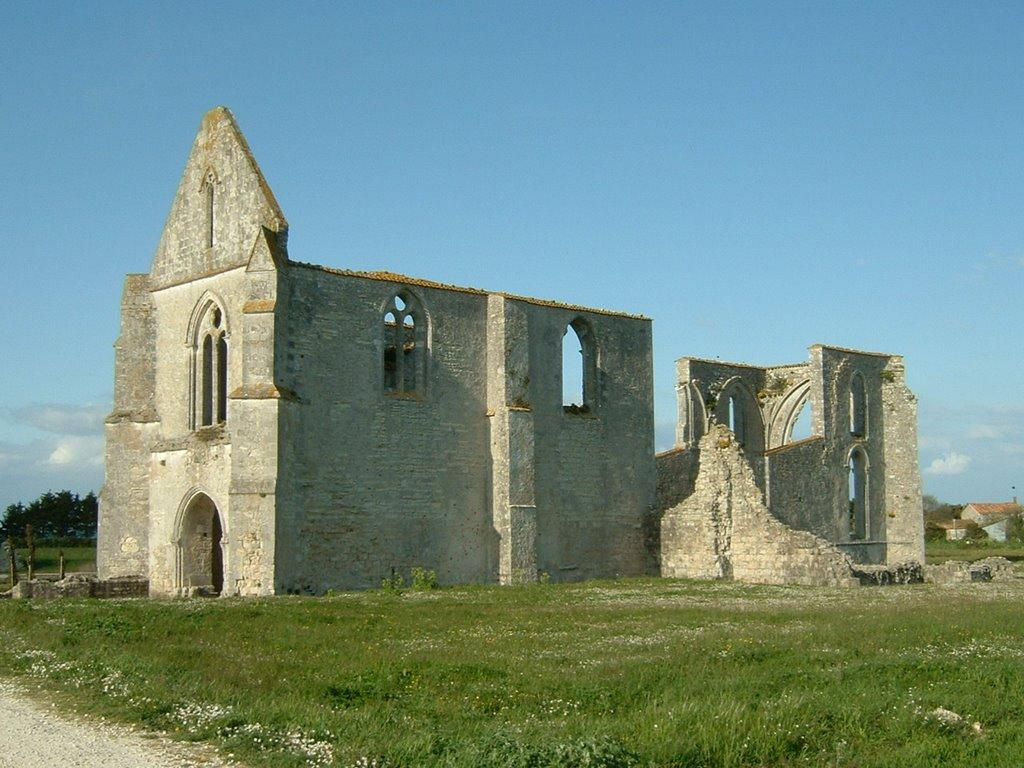
Ré Abbey, La Flotte, Île de Ré

- Ravensberghe Abbey, nuns, diocese of Thérouanne, later diocese of Saint-Omer (1191-?) (Watten, Nord)
- Ré Abbey, also known as Les Châteliers Abbey (Abbaye Notre-Dame-de-Ré dite des Châteliers), monks, diocese of Poitiers (La Flotte, Île de Ré, Charente-Maritime)
- Abbaye du Réclinatoire de Notre-Dame, see Marquette Abbey
- Le Reclus Abbey (Abbaye Notre-Dame du Reclus), monks, diocese of Troyes, later diocese of Châlons-en-Champagne (Talus-Saint-Prix, Marne)
- Abbaye Notre-Dame de Réconfort, nuns, diocese of Autun (Saizy, Nièvre)
- Reigny Abbey, also known as Vermenton Abbey, monks (1128–1790), diocese of Auxerre (Vermenton, Yonne)
- Le Relec Abbey (Abbaye Notre-Dame du Relec), monks, diocese of Saint-Pol-de-Léon (Plounéour-Ménez, Finistère)
- Rieunette Abbey or Priory (Abbaye or Prieuré Sainte-Marie de Rieunette), nuns, diocese of Carcassonne (1162–1761) (Ladern-sur-Lauquet, Aude)
- Rigny, see Reigny
- **Le Rivet Abbey** (Abbaye Notre-Dame du Rivet), in the Bazadais, monks, later nuns (from 1938), diocese of Bazas (Auros, Gironde)
- La Rivour Abbey, see Larrivour Abbey
- Les Roches Abbey (Abbaye Notre-Dame des Roches), monks, diocese of Auxerre (Myennes, Nièvre)
- Rosières Abbey (Abbaye Notre-Dame de Rosières), monks, diocese of Besançon (La Ferté, Jura)
- Les Rosiers Abbey, otherwise Priory (from 1240) (also Les Roziers), nuns (Séchault, Ardennes)
- Royaumont Abbey, monks, diocese of Beauvais (1229–1790) (Asnières-sur-Oise, Val-d'Oise)

== S ==
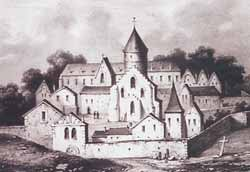
Saint-Antoine-des-Champs (Paris)

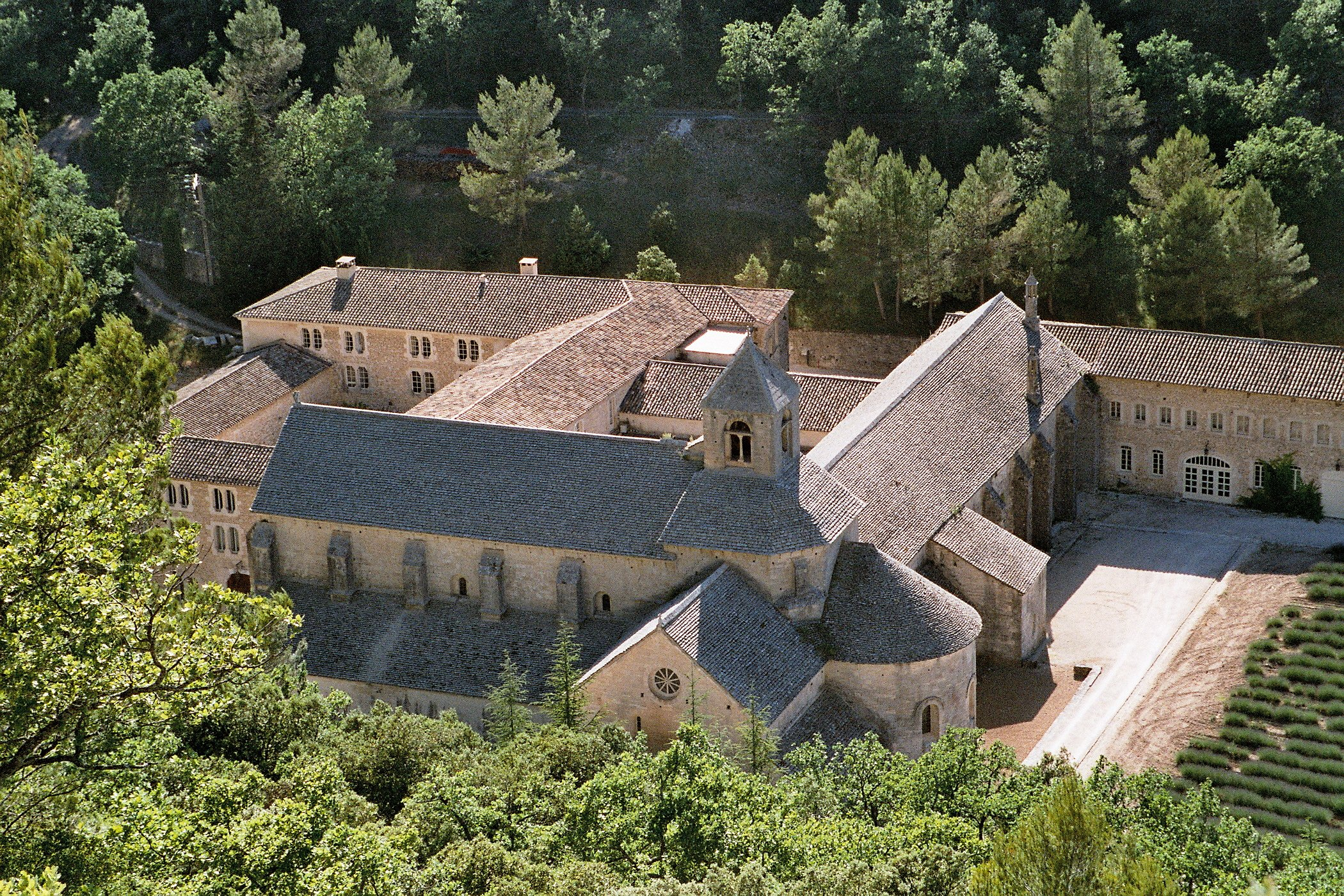
Sénanque Abbey (Vaucluse)

- Saint-André-en-Gouffern Abbey, monks, diocese of Séez (La Hoguette, Calvados)
- Abbey of Saint-Antoine-des-Champs, nuns, diocese of Paris (Paris), now the Hôpital Saint-Antoine
- **Saint-Arnoult** , otherwise **Parfondeval** (not an abbey but a grange of Froidmont Abbey), monks (Warluis, Oise)
- Saint-Aubin-du-Bois Abbey, monks, diocese of Saint-Brieuc (Plédéliac, Côtes-d'Armor)
- Saint-Benoît-en-Woëvre Abbey, monks, diocese of Metz (Saint-Benoît-en-Woëvre, Vigneulles-lès-Hattonchâtel, Meuse)
- Saint-Gelven, see Bon-Repos
- Saint-Just Abbey, nuns, diocese of Vienne
- Abbey of Saint-Léonard des Chaumes (Abbaye Saint-Léonard de Chaumes), diocese of La Rochelle
- Saint-Marcel Abbey, monks, diocese of Cahors (Réalville, Tarn-et-Garonne)
- Saint-Paul-de-Beaurepaire Abbey, nuns, diocese of Vienne
- Saint-Sigismond Abbey, nuns (Orthez, France)
- Saint-Sulpice-en-Bugey Abbey, monks, diocese of Belley (Thézillieu, Ain)
- Sainte-Acire Abbey (or Priory?) (Seine-Port, Seine-et-Marne)
- St. Catherine's Abbey, nuns, diocese of Geneva
- St. Catherine's Abbey, Avignon, nuns, diocese of Avignon (Avignon)
- Sainte-Croix Abbey, nuns, diocese of Apt
- Sainte-Houlde Abbey (or Hoïlde or Hould): see Le Val d'Ornain
- Les Salenques Abbey (also known as Abondance-Dieu Abbey) (Les Bordes-sur-Arize, Ariège)
- Salvane or Silvanis Abbey, see Sylvanès
- Saubalade Abbey or Sauvelade Abbey (Abbaye Notre-Dame de Saubalade or Sauvelade), monks, diocese of Lescar (founded 1127) (Sauvelade, Pyrénées-Atlantiques)
- Sauvebénite or Sauvebenoite Abbey, nuns, diocese of Le Puy
- Le Sauvoir Abbey, nuns, diocese of Laon
- Savigny Abbey, monks, diocese of Avranches (Savigny-le-Vieux, Manche)
- Scellières Abbey (Abbaye Notre-Dame de Scellières), monks, diocese of Troyes (1168-?) (Romilly-sur-Seine, Aube)
- Selles Abbey, formerly Celles Abbey (Abbaye de Selles-sur-Cher), monks (previously Canons Regular; Feuillants, 1613–1791), diocese of Bourges (Selles-sur-Cher, Loir-et-Cher)
- **Sénanque Abbey** (Abbaye de Sénanque or Abbaye Notre-Dame de Sénanque), monks (Gordes, Vaucluse)
- **Sept-Fons Abbey** (Abbaye de Sept-Fons or Abbaye Notre-Dame de Sept-Fons), monks, diocese of Autun (Dompierre-sur-Besbre, Allier)
- Signy Abbey (Abbaye Notre-Dame de Signy), monks, diocese of Reims (Signy-l'Abbaye, Ardennes)
- Silvacane Abbey, also Sauvecanne Abbey, monks (1144–1450) (La Roque-d'Anthéron, Bouches-du-Rhône)
- Soligny, see La Trappe
- Sturzelbronn Abbey, monks, diocese of Metz (Sturzelbronn, Moselle)
- Sylvanès Abbey (otherwise Silvanès Abbey, Silvanis Abbey or Salvane Abbey) (1136–1789) (Sylvanès, Aveyron)

== T ==
- **Tamié Abbey** (Abbaye Notre-Dame de Tamié), monks (Plancherine, Savoie)
- Tart Abbey, nuns, diocese of Langres (Tart-l'Abbaye, Côte-d'Or)
- Theuley Abbey (or Tulley Abbey), monks, diocese of Besançon, later Langres (Vars, Haute-Saône)
- Le Thoronet Abbey (Abbaye du Thoronet or Abbaye Notre-Dame du Thoronet), diocese of Fréjus, united in 1785 with the diocese of Digne (Le Thoronet, Var)
- **Timadeuc Abbey** (Abbaye de Timadeuc or Abbaye Notre-Dame de Timadeuc / Thymadeuc), Trappist monks (from 1841) (Bréhan, Morbihan)
- Torigny Abbey, monks (founded c. 1134 at La Boulaye; transferred to Torigni 1308) (Torigni-sur-Vire, Manche)
- **La Trappe Abbey** (Abbaye Notre-Dame de Trappe, Abbaye de la Grande-Trappe or Abbaye de Soligny), monks, diocese of Séez (Soligny-la-Trappe, Orne)
- Abbaye du Trésor Notre-Dame (Bus-Saint-Rémy, Eure)
- Trizay Abbey (Abbaye Sainte-Marie de Trizay, Abbaye du Gué de Trizay or de Trisay), diocese of Luçon (Saint-Vincent-Puymaufrais (1833–1972), now Bournezeau, Vendée)
- Trois-Fontaines Abbey, monks, diocese of Châlons-sur-Marne (Heiltz-le-Maurupt, Marne)
- Tyronneau Abbey, monks, diocese of Le Mans (1149–1790) (Saint-Aignan, Sarthe)

== U ==
- Ubexy Abbey (Abbaye Notre-Dame de Saint-Joseph d'Ubexy), Trappistine nuns (founded 1841; priory from 1847; abbey from 1878; dissolved 2012, when the remaining nuns transferred to Igny Abbey) (Ubexy, Vosges)
- Ulmet Abbey, also known as Aumet Abbey (Abbaye d'Ulmet or d'Aumet), monks, diocese of Arles (founded 1173; community mostly moved to Sylvéréal Abbey in the third quarter of the 13th century; finally abandoned in 1437) (in the Camargue, commune of Arles, Bouches-du-Rhône; the ruins, near the Étang de Fournelet, are now included in the Réserve naturelle nationale de Camargue)

== V ==
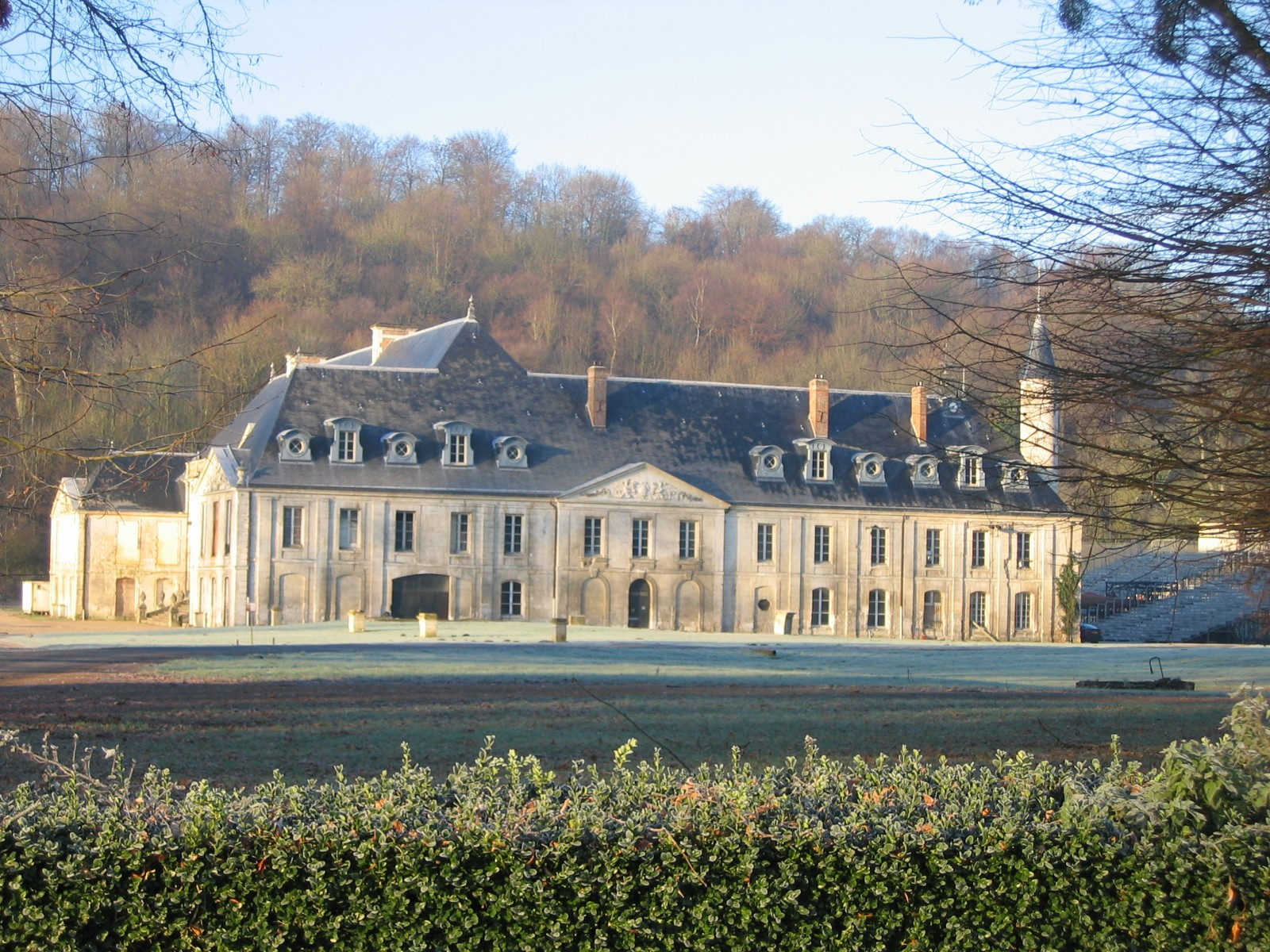
Le Valasse Abbey (Seine-Maritime)

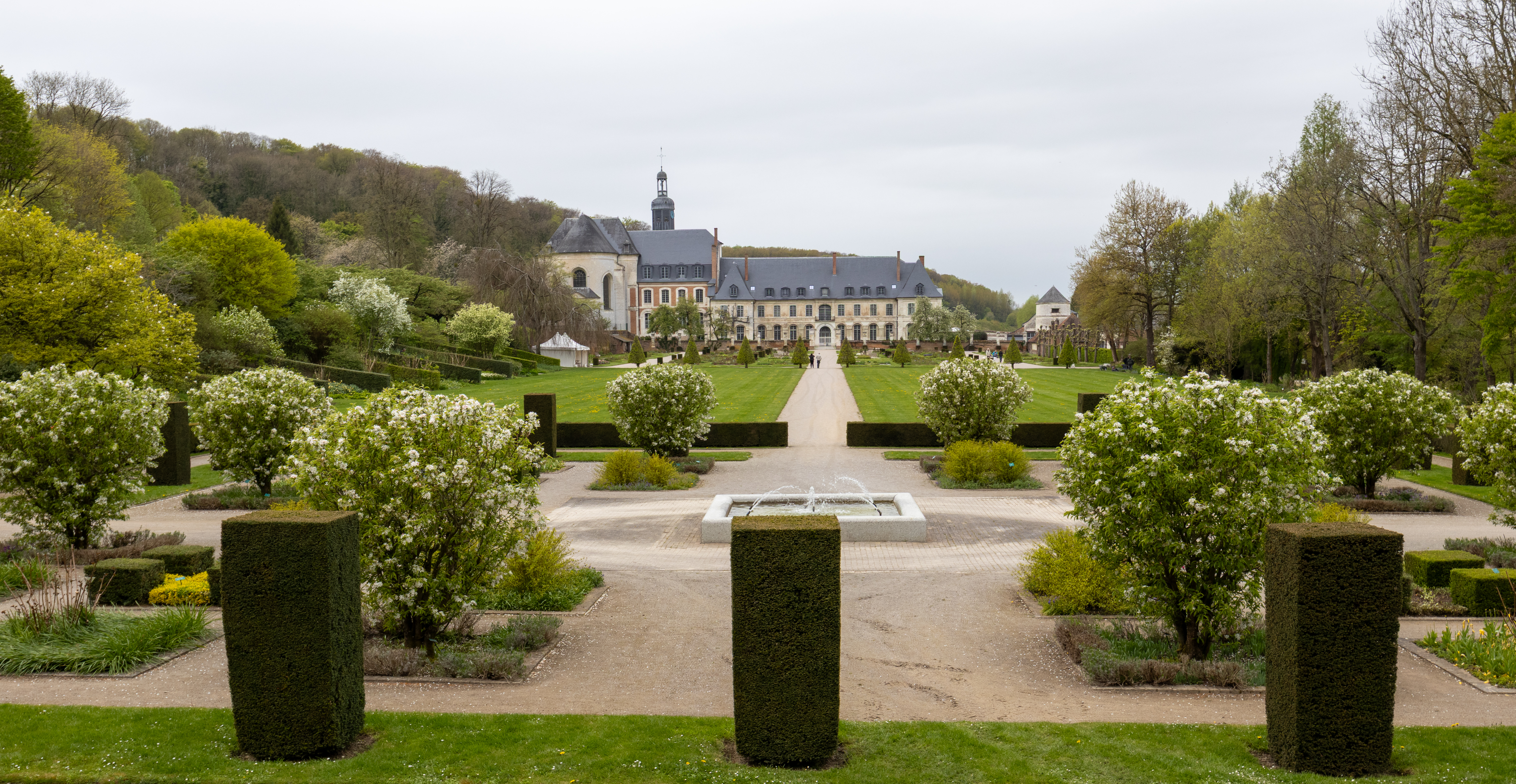
Valloires Abbey (Argoules, Somme)

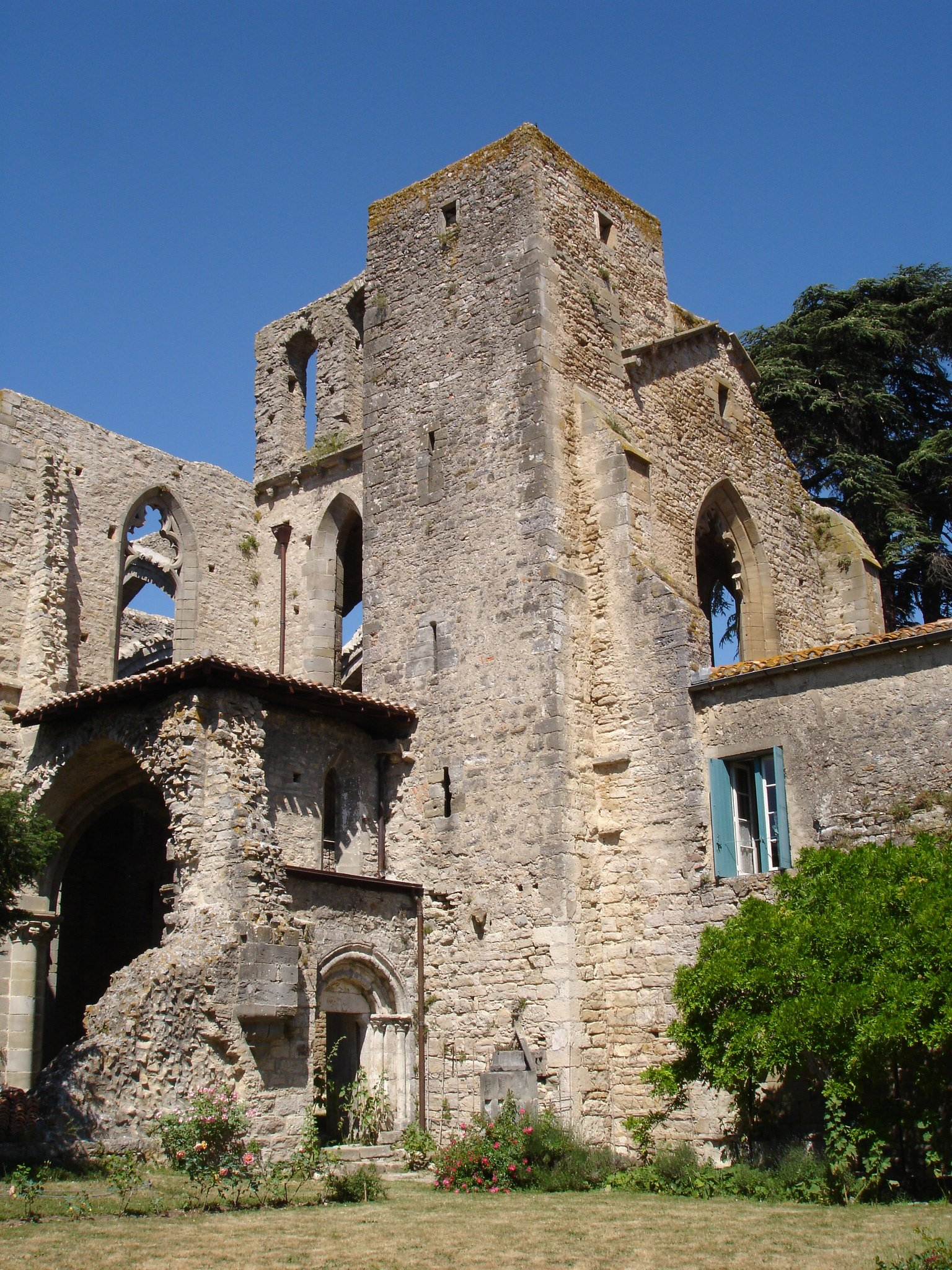
Villelongue Abbey (Aude)

- Le Val Abbey (Abbaye Notre-Dame du Val), monks (Mériel, Val-d'Oise)
- Le Val-de-Bressieux Abbey, also Laval-Bénite Abbey or Laval-Bressieux Abbey (Abbaye du Val-de-Bressieux, de Laval-Bénite or de Laval-Bressieux), nuns, diocese of Vienne (1117 or -19–1791) (Saint-Pierre-de-Bressieux, Isère)
- Le Val-des-Choues Abbey, also Val-des-Choux (Abbaye du Val-des-Choues or des-Choux), monks (independent monastery 1193–1763; Cistercian, under Sept-Fons Abbey, 1763–1791; the surviving buildings are occupied (2018) by the Musée-Opéra de la Vénerie) (Villiers-le-Duc, Côte-d'Or)
- Val d'Ornain Abbey or Sainte-Hoïlde Abbey, Val d'Ornain (Abbaye Sainte-Hoïlde du Val d'Ornain or Sainte-Hould or Sainte-Houlde), nuns, diocese of Toul (Val-d'Ornain, Meuse)
- Val-Honnête Abbey, see Féniers Abbey
- Le Val-Richer Abbey, monks, diocese of Bayeux (Saint-Ouen-le-Pin, Calvados)
- Le Val-des-Vignes Abbey (Abbaye du Val-des-Vignes), nuns, diocese of Langres (before 1220–1443; re-founded after 1443 as a Cistercian priory for monks, but dissolved again in 1487) (Ailleville, Aube)
- Le Valasse, see Gruchet
- Valbenoîte Abbey, monks, diocese of Lyon (Valbenoîte, Saint-Étienne, Loire)
- Valbonne Abbey, monks, diocese of Perpignan (Valbonne, Alpes-Maritimes)
- Valcroissant Abbey, monks, diocese of Die (Die, Drôme)
- Valence Abbey (Abbaye de Valence), monks, diocese of Poitiers (1225 or 1230–1791) (Couhé, Vienne)
- La Valette Abbey (Abbaye Notre-Dame de la Valette), monks, diocese of Tulle (founded as a Benedictine abbey probably in 1143; Cistercian from 1147; dissolved 1791; remains submerged in 1951 by the construction of a dam, the Barrage du Chastang) (Auriac, Corrèze)
- Valloires Abbey, monks, diocese of Amiens, in Picardie (Argoules, Somme)
- Vallonnette Abbey, see Féniers Abbey
- Valmagne Abbey (Abbaye de Valmagne or Abbaye Sainte-Marie de Valmagne), monks, diocese of Agde (1159–1789) (Villeveyrac, Hérault)
- La Valroy Abbey (or Val-Roi or Val-Roy), monks, diocese of Reims (1150–1790) (Saint-Quentin-le-Petit, Ardennes)
- Valsaintes Abbey (Abbaye Notre-Dame de Valsaintes, de Simiane or de Boulinette), monks, diocese of Apt (1180–1792) (Simiane-la-Rotonde, Alpes-de-Haute-Provence)
- Valsauve Abbey (Abbaye de Valsauve, Abbaye Royale Notre-Dame de Valsauve), nuns, diocese of Uzès (founded before 1217 as priory; moved to Bagnols 1375 and later elevated to a royal abbey; dissolved 1790) (Bagnols-sur-Cèze, Gard)
- Varennes Abbey (Abbaye Notre-Dame de Varennes), monks, diocese of Bourges (Fougerolles, Indre)
- La Vassin Abbey, also Lavaysse or La Veissy Abbey (Abbaye La Vassin, Lavaysse or La Veissy), nuns, diocese of Clermont (c. 1150 – 1792) (Saint-Donat, Puy-de-Dôme)
- Vaucelles Abbey, monks, diocese of Cambrai (Les Rues-des-Vignes, Nord)
- Vauclair Abbey, monks, diocese of Laon (Bouconville-Vauclair, Aisne)
- Vauluisant Abbey, monks, diocese of Sens (Courgenay, Yonne)
- Vauluisant Abbey, see Le Bouschet-Vauluisant Abbey
- Vaux-de-Cernay Abbey, monks, diocese of Paris (Cernay-la-Ville, Yvelines)
- Vaux-la-Douce Abbey, monks, diocese of Langres (Voisey, Haute-Marne)
- Abbey of Les Vaux-en-Ornois (Abbaye des Vaux-en-Ornois, also Abbaye d'Évaux), monks, diocese of Toul (Saint-Joire, Meuse)
- Abbaye Notre-Dame du Verger, nuns, diocese of Cambrai (Oisy-le-Verger, Pas-de-Calais)
- Vermonton Abbey, see Reigny Abbey
- Vernaison Abbey, nuns, diocese of Valence (Châteauneuf-sur-Isère, Drôme)
- Vic Priory, otherwise Vic-lès-Capdenac Priory, nuns, diocese of Cahors (Vic, Capdenac, Lot)
- La Vieuville Abbey (or La Vieuxville Abbey) (Abbaye Notre-Dame de la Vieuville or Vieuxville), monks, diocese of Dol (Epiniac, Ille-et-Vilaine)
- Vignogoul Abbey, nuns, diocese of Montpellier (Pignan, Hérault)
- Villelongue Abbey (Abbaye de Villelongue, Abbaye Sainte-Marie de Villelongue), monks, diocese of Carcassonne (Saint-Martin-le-Vieil, Aude)
- Villeneuve Abbey, monks, diocese of Nantes (Le Bignon, then, from 1865, Les Sorinières, Loire-Atlantique)
- Villers-Bettnach Abbey, monks, diocese of Metz (Saint-Hubert, Moselle)
- Villers-Canivet Abbey, nuns, diocese of Séez (Villers-Canivet, Calvados)
- Villiers Abbey or Villiers-aux-Nonnains Abbey (Abbaye de Villiers-aux-Nonnains, Abbaye Notre-Dame de Villiers, Abbaye Villiers-la-Joie), nuns, diocese of Sens (Cerny, Essonne)
- La Virginité Abbey (Abbaye de la Virginité), nuns, diocese of Le Mans (Les Roches-l'Évêque, Loir-et-Cher)
- Vitry Abbey (Abbaye Saint-Jacques de Vitry, de Vitry-le-Perthois, or de Vitry-le-Brûlé), nuns, diocese of Châlons-sur-Marne (Vitry-en-Perthois, Marne)
- Le Vivier Abbey (Abbay du Vivier), nuns, diocese of Cambrai (1219 – 1640 in Wancourt; 1640 – 1791 in Arras) (Wancourt, later Arras, Pas-de-Calais)
- Voisins Abbey, nuns, diocese of Orléans (Saint-Ay, Loiret)

== W ==
- Willencourt Abbey, nuns, diocese of Amiens (Willencourt, Pas-de-Calais)
- Woestyne Abbey, also L'Oustine Abbey, nuns, diocese of Saint-Omer (Renescure, Nord)

== See also ==
- List of Christian monasteries in France
- List of Augustinian monasteries in France
- List of Benedictine monasteries in France
- List of Carthusian monasteries § France
- List of Premonstratensian monasteries in France
