= Altbronn Abbey =

Former Trappistine nunnery in Bas-Rhin, France

- Abbaye Notre-Dame-de-la-Miséricorde d'Altbronn
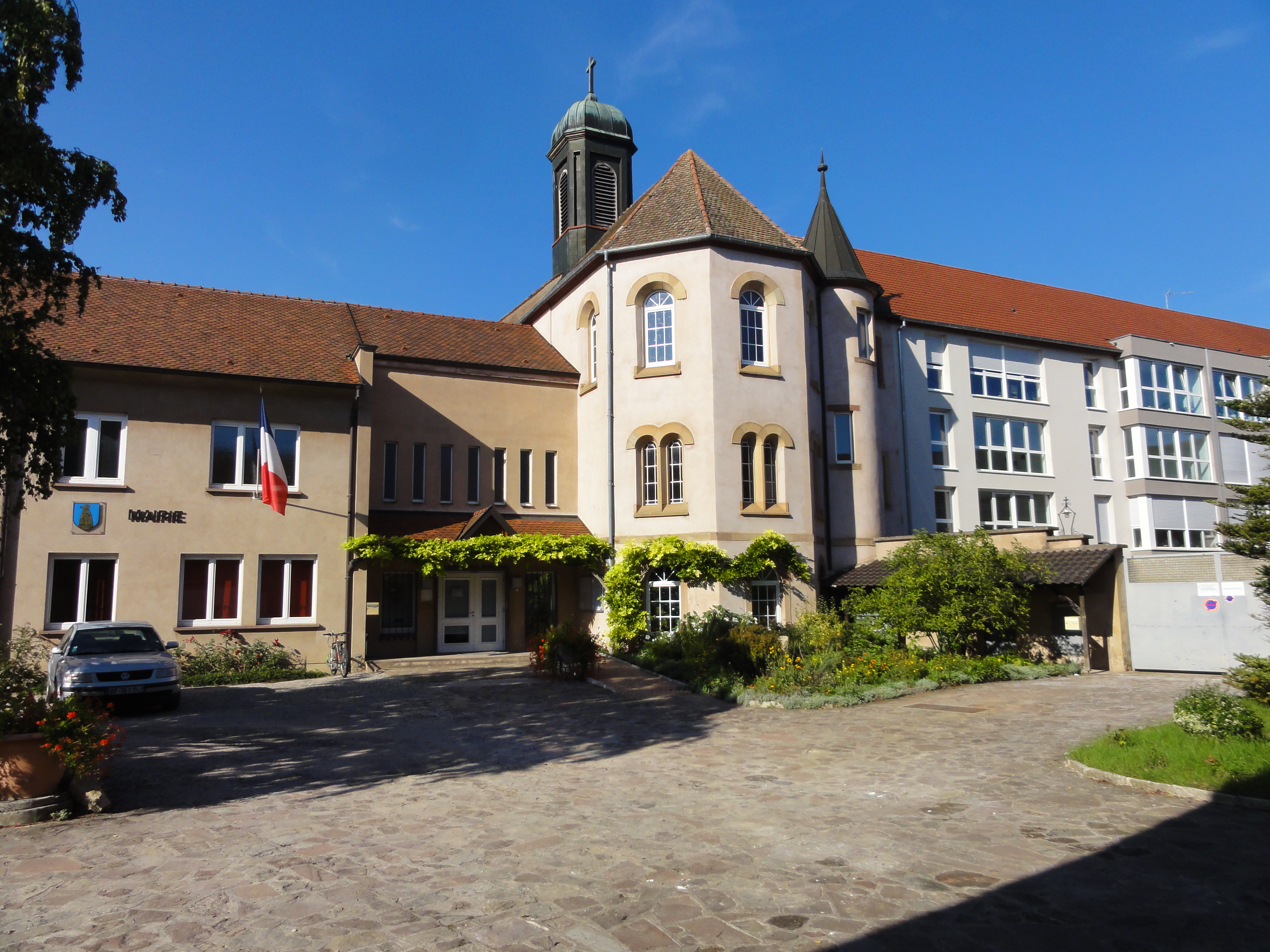
- Former buildings and chapel, now the town hall

- Location within France Location within Grand Est Location within Alsace

Monastery information
- Other name: Abbatia Beate Mariae de Altbronn (Latin)
- Order: Trappistine
- Established: 1895
- Disestablished: 2009
- Mother house: Oelenberg Abbey
- Dedication: Our Lady
- Diocese: Archdiocese of Strasbourg

People
- Abbess: See list

Architecture
- Architect: Dacheux
- Groundbreaking: 9 september 1894

Site
- Location: Ergersheim, Bas-Rhin, France
- Coordinates: 48°34′10″N 07°31′42″E

Altbronn Abbey or Our Lady of Mercy Abbey (Latin: Abbatia Beate Mariae de Altbronn; French: Abbaye Notre-Dame-de-la-Miséricorde d'Altbronn) is a former Trappistine nunnery in Ergersheim, Bas-Rhin, northeastern France.

== History ==
Throughout the 19th century, Oelenberg Abbey in Haut-Rhin was a double monastery with masculine and feminine communities. These two communities were founded in 1815 and 1825 by monks and nuns who fled from France to Kleinburlo and Rosenthal, Westphalia during the Revolutionary and Imperial periods. In 1825, the 34 nuns settled in the monastery that the monks built when they came back from exile.

However, both monasteries prospered and founded several daughter houses, especially in Germany and Benelux. The commnuties grew (84 nuns in 1893), so Oelenberg became too small. 80 nuns settled near Ergersheim, Bas-Rhin in the Abbey of Our Lady of Altbronn, named after a local pilgrimage that has existed since 1397. The abbey was canonically approved on July 8, 1927.

== Houses ==
The house of Ergersheim is a former noble property built by the Simonis family in 1826. It is located on a 4-hectare land. The building was transformed into a monastery by architect Dacheux. The foundation stone was laid on September 9, 1894.

On December 3, 2009, the community which had become too small for the Altbronn site (20 nuns in 2000, 17 in 2009) and which was disturbed by the demographic growth of the village and the growing noise, decided to sell the abbey and to move to Baumgarten Abbey in the nearby village of Bernardvillé.

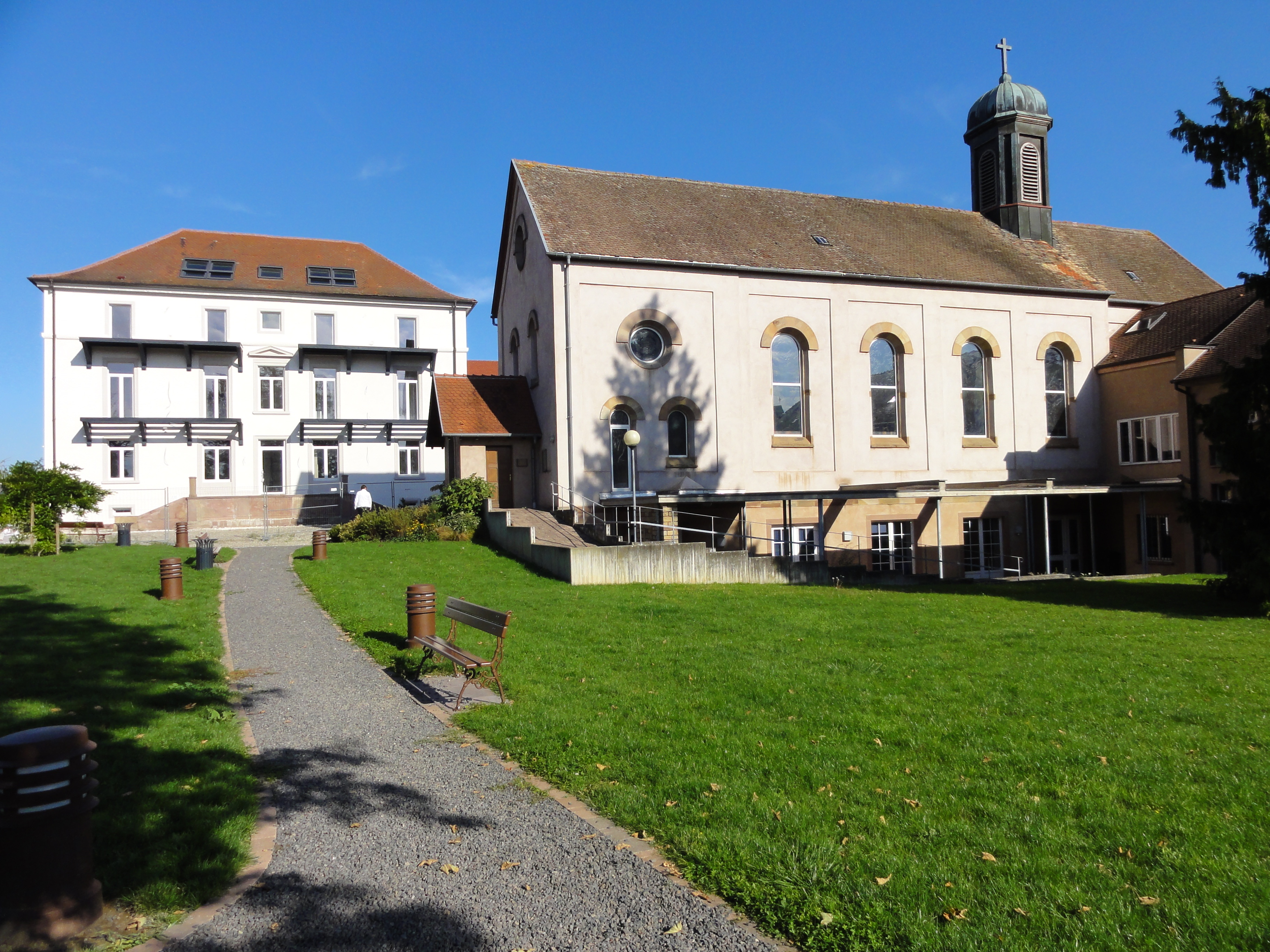

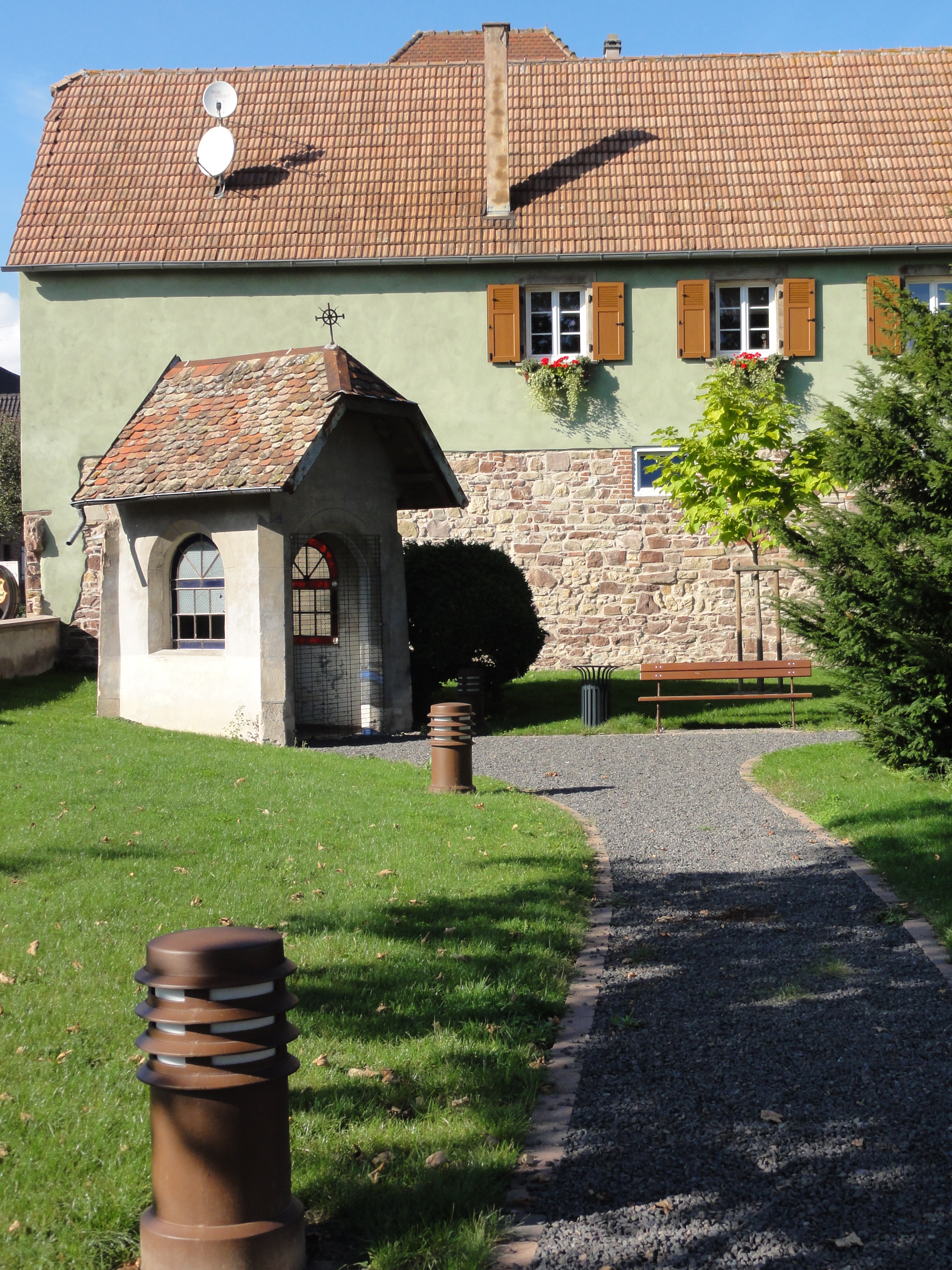

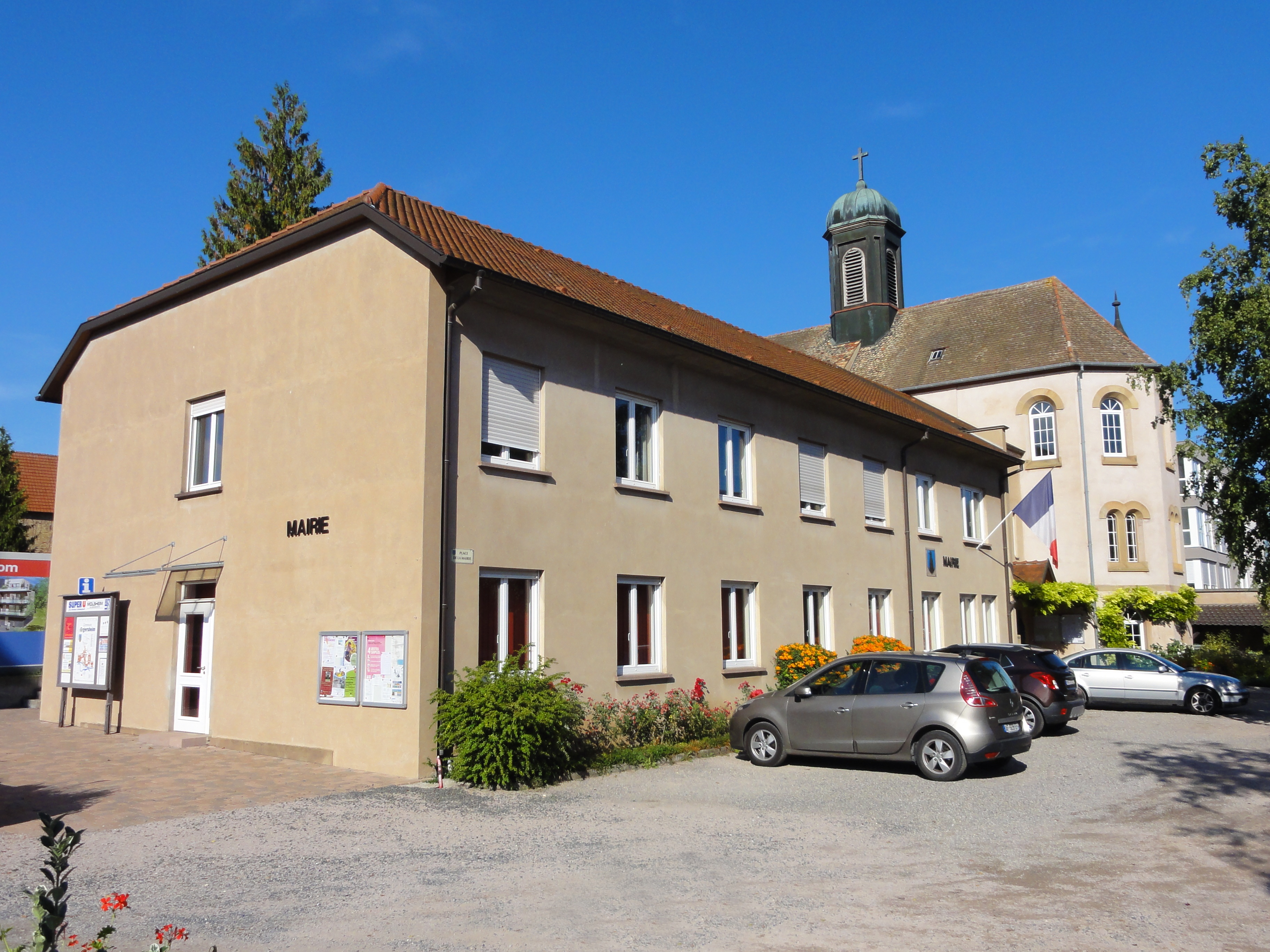

=== List of abbesses ===
During the exile

- Mother Augustin de Chabannes (from 1796 to 1801)
- Mother Edmond Paul de Barth (from 1801 to 1808)
- Mother Helena Van de Broech (from 1808 to 1825).

At Oelenberg

- Mother Helena Van de Broech (from 29 September 1825 to 12 May 1826)
- Stanislas Schey (from 1826 to 26 December 1848)
- Joséphine Merklin (from 1849 to 1854)
- Humbeline Clercx (from 1854 to 1860)
- Pelagia Faulhaber (from 1860 to 18 January 1863)
- Élisabeth Van de Grootveen (from 1863 to 1866)
- Hieronyma Liétard (from 1866 to 21 January 1881)
- Raphael Lichtle (from 9 February to 27 December 1881)
- Scholastika Dibling (from 21 January 1882 until the community moved to Ergersheim)

At Ergersheim

- Scholastika Dibling (from 6 December 1895 to 30 October 1912)
- Léontine Grunder (from 30 October 1912 to 14 December 1918)
- Constantia Rotheigner (from 14 December 1918 to 14 December 1921)
- Léontine Grunder (again, from 14 December 1921 to 15 December 1927)
- Alphonsa Stauble (from 15 December 1927 to 24 May 1930)
- Léontine Grunder (third time, from 14 June 1930 to 21 March 1938)
- Ida Jordan (from 11 April 1938 to 6 May 1959)
- Hélène Naegelin (from 6 May 1959 to 18 May 1983)
- Anne-Marie Schwald (from 18 May 1983 to 24 April 2003)
- Marie-Odile Faller (from 9 May 2003 until the community moved to Baumgarten)

At Baumgarten

Marie-Odile Faller (since 3 December 2009).

== See also ==
- List of Cistercian monasteries in France

== Bibliography ==
- Xibaut, Bernard (2005). L'aventure des trappistines d'Ergersheim (in French).
- Sœur Lamberta (2010). De transfert en transfert : de Dom Augustin de Lestrange jusqu'à l'abbaye de Baumgarten (PDF) (in French). ARCCIS (Association pour le Rayonnement de la Culture CIStercienne).
