= Beaupré Abbey (Picardy) =

Abbey in Oise, France

Coordinates: 49°33′49″N 1°57′53″E

not to be confused with Beaupré Abbey (Lorraine) or the nunnery of Beaupré Abbey (Nord)

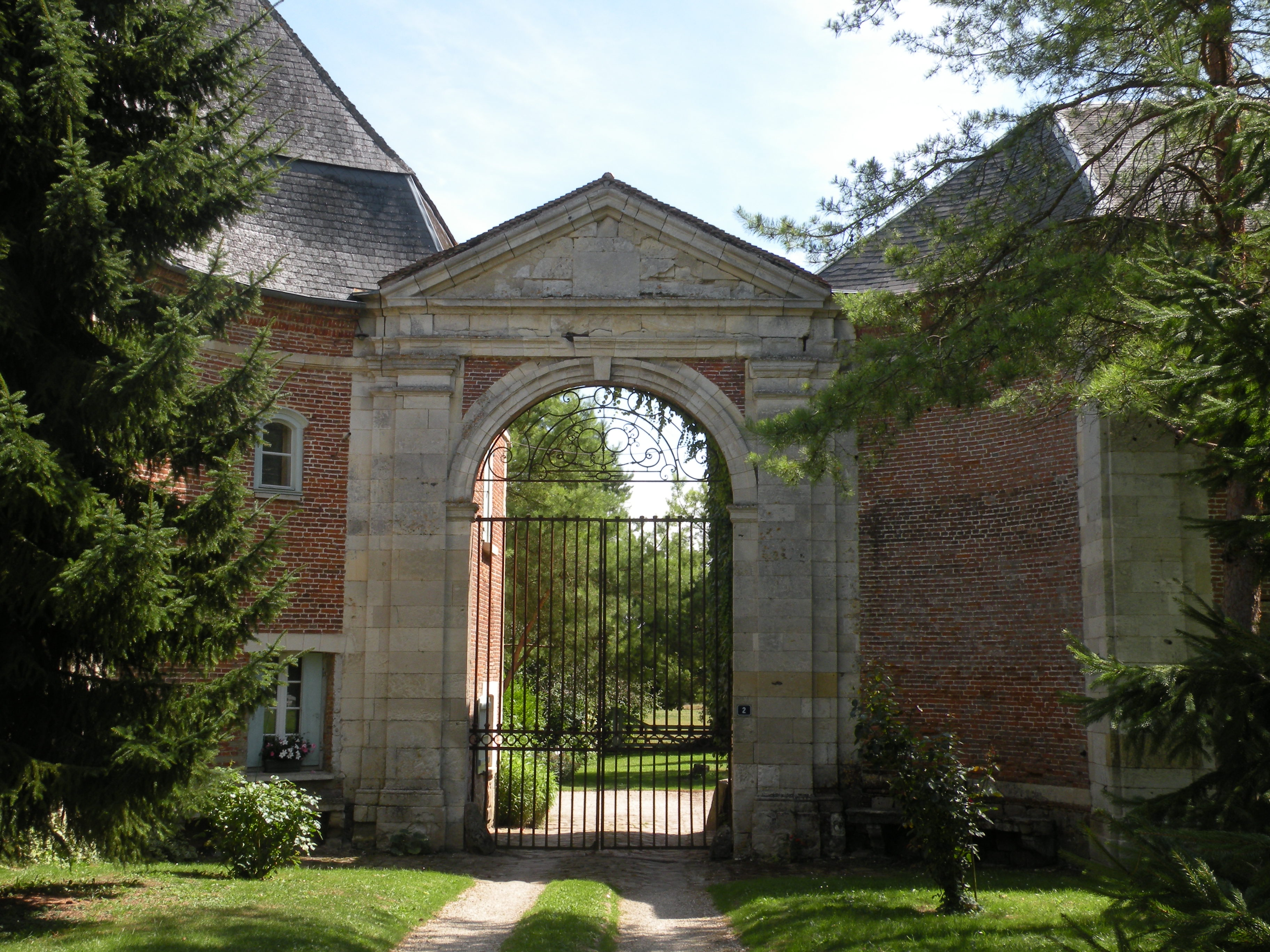
Gateway of the former Beaupré Abbey

Beaupré Abbey (French: Abbaye de Beaupré; Latin: Bellum pratum) is a former Cistercian monastery in the commune of Achy, department of Oise and region of Picardy, France. Its site is located about 2 km south-east of Marseille-en-Beauvaisis, on the Petit-Thérain brook.

== History ==
The monastery was founded in 1135 on lands given by the seigneurs of Milly and settled by monks from Ourscamp Abbey, its motherhouse, of the filiation of Clairvaux.

The abbey owned granges at Caurroy, Brombos and Briot-la-Grange, the farms of Woimaison and Ovillers and the wood of Malmifait.

In 1346 it was destroyed during the Hundred Years' War by Edward III, King of England.

It is not easy to determine exactly when it was dissolved - probably during the French Revolution, and possibly in 1791. In the 19th century the buildings were used as a cotton mill and later sold for demolition.

== Buildings and site ==
The church has mostly disappeared. Still in existence are the refectory of the guest wing, the main gateway and parts of the precinct wall, as well as the ruins of the abbey mill.
