= Parnoy-en-Bassigny =

- Commune
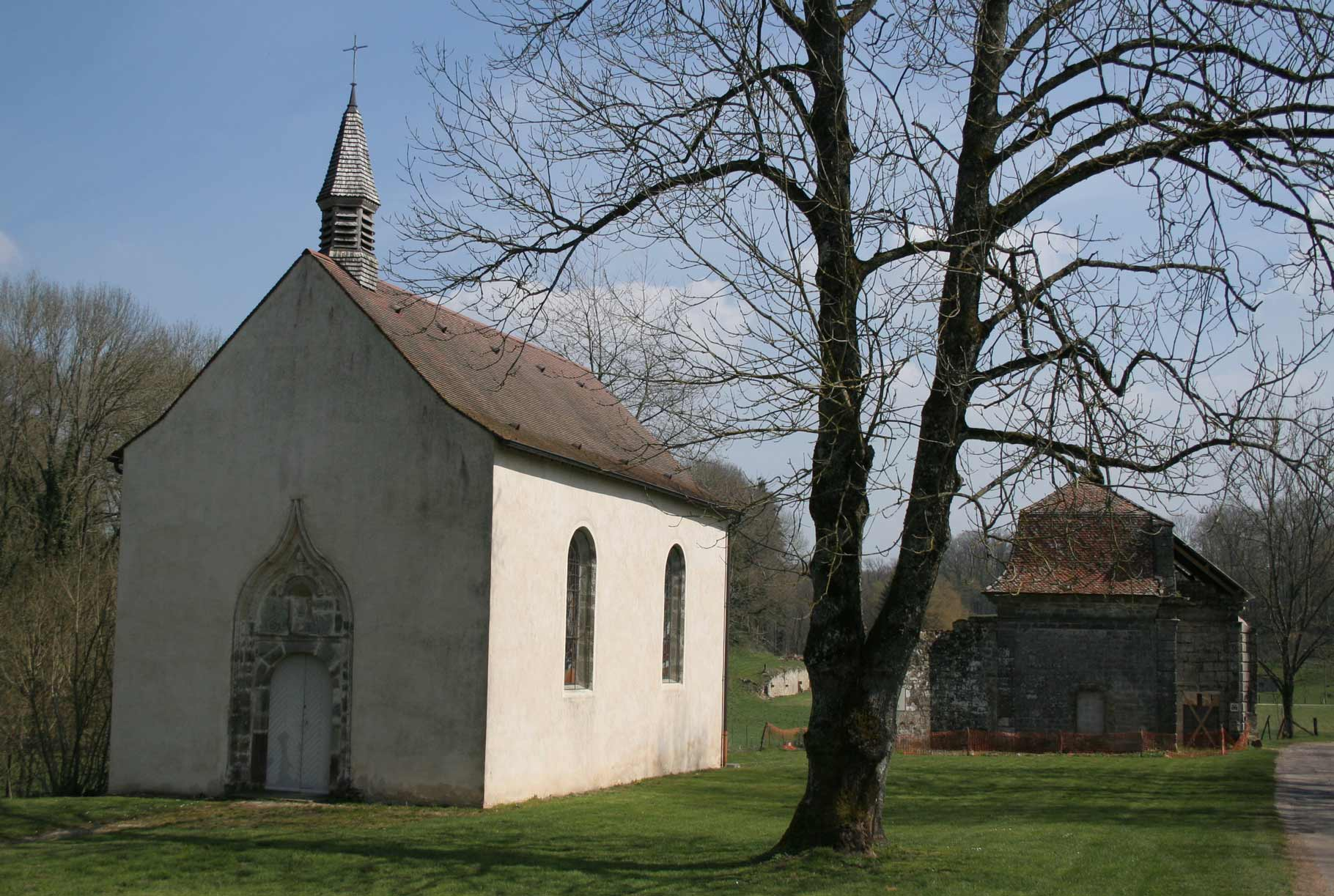
- The Morimond chapel in Parnoy-en-Bassigny
- Location of Parnoy-en-Bassigny
- Location within France Location within Grand Est
- Coordinates: 48°00′28″N 5°38′43″E
- Country: France
- Region: Grand Est
- Department: Haute-Marne
- Arrondissement: Langres
- Canton: Bourbonne-les-Bains

Government
  - Mayor (2020–2026): Christine Gobillot
- Area^{1}: 40.75 km^{2} (15.73 sq mi)
- Elevation: 400 m (1,300 ft)
- Population (2023): 273
  - Density: 6.70/km^{2} (17.4/sq mi)
- Time zone: UTC+01:00 (CET)
  - Summer (DST): UTC+02:00 (CEST)
- INSEE/Postal code: 52377 /52400
- ^{1} French Land Register data, which excludes lakes, ponds, glaciers > 1 km^{2} (0.386 sq mi or 247 acres) and river estuaries.

Parnoy-en-Bassigny (French pronunciation: [paʁnwa ɑ̃ basiɲi]) is a commune in the Haute-Marne department in north-eastern France.

Parnoy-en-Bassigny was created in 1973 with the merger of the former communes Parnot and Fresnoy-en-Bassigny.

== See also ==
- Communes of the Haute-Marne department
