= Dalon Abbey =

Cistercian monastery in Dordogne, France

- Abbaye de Dalon
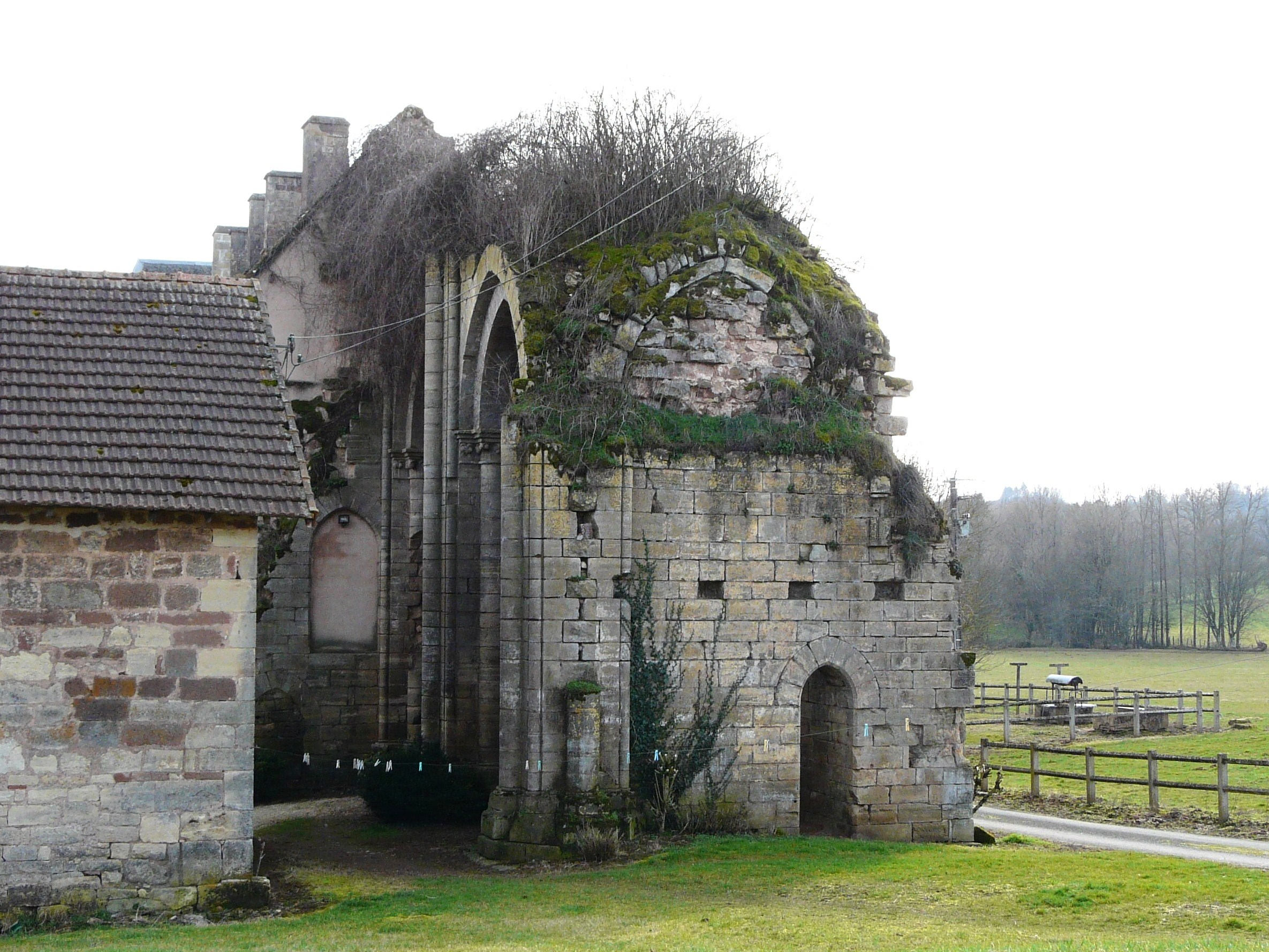
- The ruins of Dalon Abbey

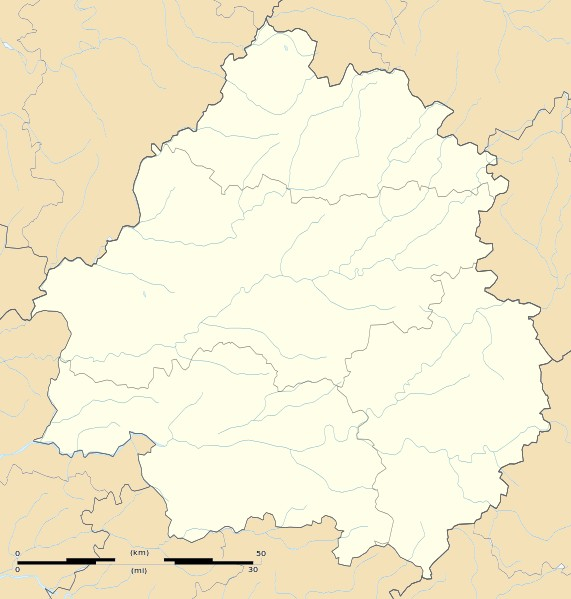
- Location within France Location within Nouvelle-Aquitaine Location within Dordogne

Monastery information
- Other name: Dalona (Latin)
- Order: Benedictine; Cistercian (since 1162)
- Established: 1114
- Mother house: Pontigny Abbey
- Diocese: Roman Catholic Diocese of Périgueux

People
- Founder: Gerald of Salles
- Abbot: Jean-Marc de Royère (commendatory abbot)

Architecture
- Heritage designation: Historic Monument (No. PA00082905)
- Designated date: 1948

Site
- Location: Sainte-Trie, Dordogne, France
- Coordinates: 45°16′25″N 1°13′31″E

Dalon Abbey (Latin: Dalona; French: Abbaye de Dalon; Occitan: Abadiá de Dalon) is a former Cistercian monastery in Sainte-Trie, Dordogne, southwestern France. It is listed as a Historic Monument.

== History ==
Dalon Abbey was founded in 1114 by Gerald of Salles (or Salis) under the Rule of Saint Benedict thanks to donations by Gerald of Lastours and his brother Gouffier, who attended the abbey's foundation day alongside Eustorge, the Bishop of Limoges, and several local lords. The successor of Gerald of Salles, the hermit Roger, developed the abbey and established several monasteries and priories (Aubignac, Bœuil, Loc-Dieu, the Palais Notre-Dame, Prébenoît), thereby forming the Order of Dalon.

In 1142, Dalon was not a Cistercian community, but several other abbeys had already adopted the Cistercian Rule. On that year, Stephen of Obazine, abbot of Obazine, followed the advice of Aymeric, bishop of Clermont, and requested Roger to send monks to introduce the Rule in Dalon.

Upon Roger's death in 1159, the monks of Dalon requested the general chapter of Pontigny to send other instructors, since both orders were following the same Benedictine rule.

In 1162, just after the election of the third abbot, Dalon joined the Order of Cistercians alongside its daughter houses Bœuil, Bonlieu, Loc-Dieu, le Palais and Prébenoît. Dalon became the third daughter house of Pontigny and received protection from Henry Plantagenet, Eleanor of Aquitaine and Richard the Lionheart. The well-known troubadour and lord of Hautefort Bertran de Born withdrew as a monk into Dalon and died there in 1215.

Dalon Abbey owned several granges in Périgord, as well as the Priory of Saint-Blaise in the parish of Milhac. Moreover, the order founded the bastide of Puybrun in the Quercy region.

In the 17th century, the remains of the abbey (the monks' building, the chapter house and the two chapels of the right-hand side of the transept) were integrated into the northern side of the newly-established dwellings.

In 1784, the Bishop of Castres, Jean-Marc de Royère, was appointed as commendatory abbot of Dalon. Since the late 18th century, Dalon Abbey has been located in the department of Dordogne in the commune of Sainte-Trie. It is now private property.

According to Janauschek, Dalon Abbey had the Order number CCCLXXV (375).

On 27 September 1948, the dwellings, the chapter house and the dovecote were listed as a Historic Monument.

== Gallery ==
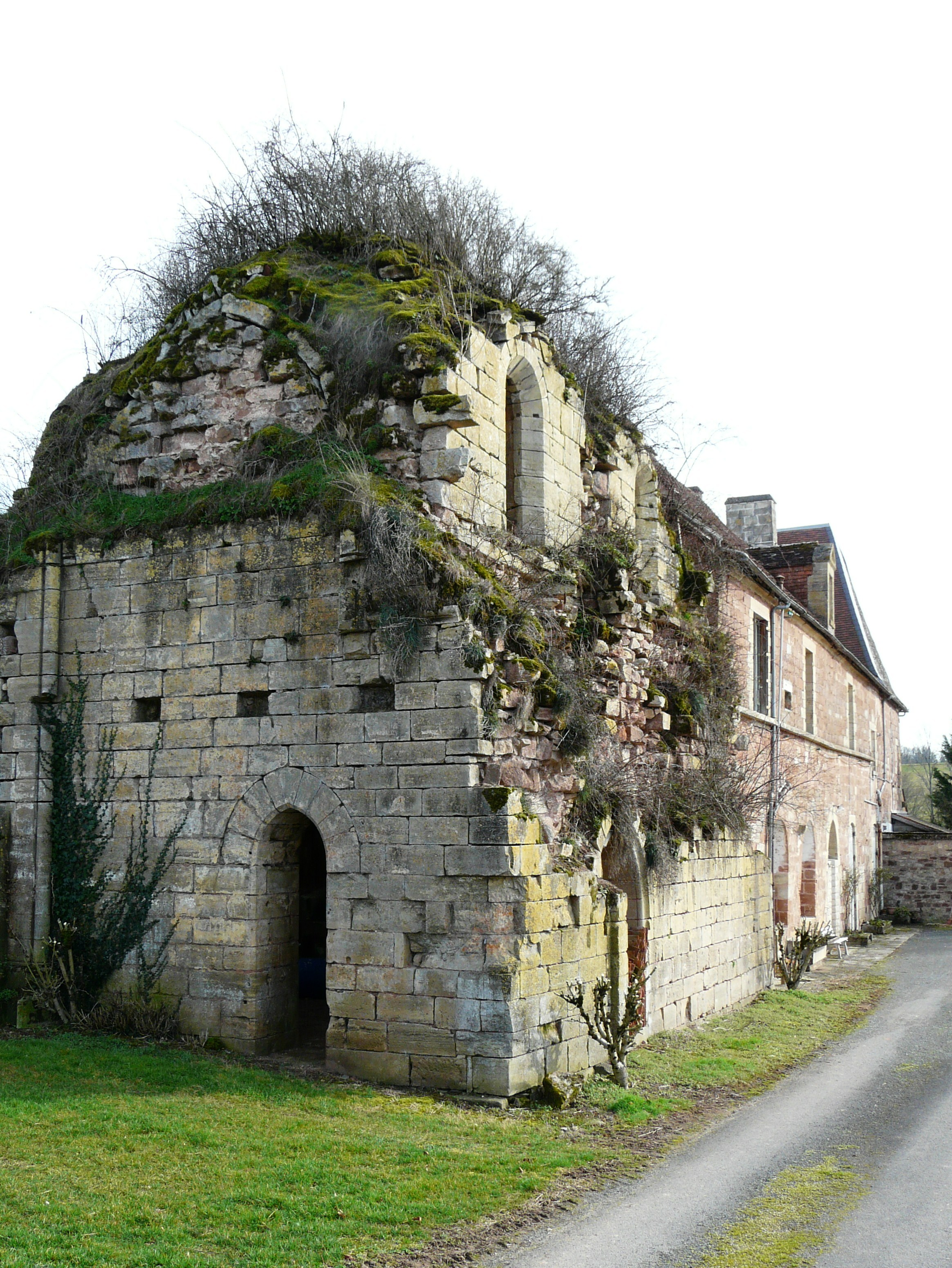
The ruins adjacent to the dwellings

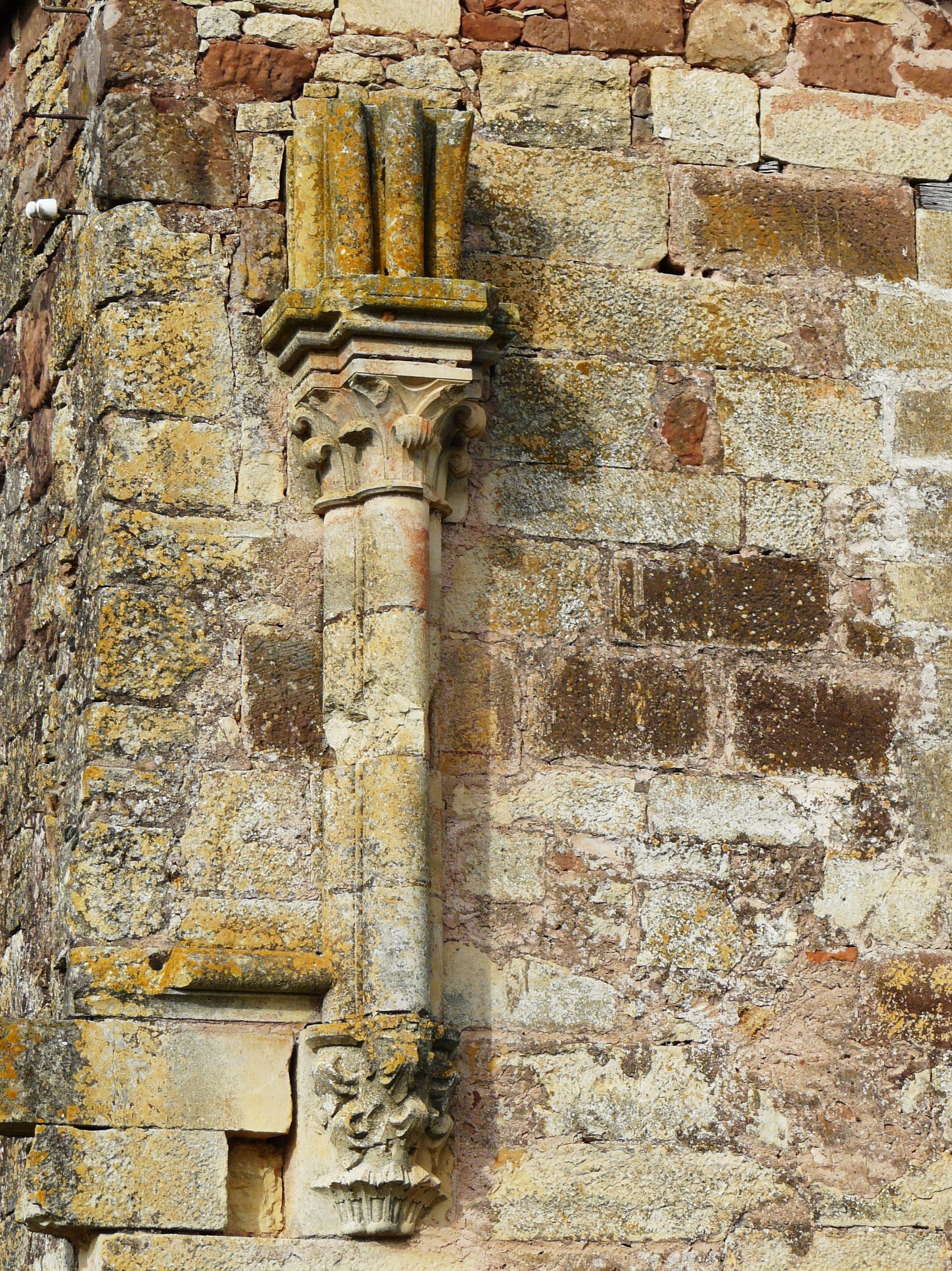
The remains of a column

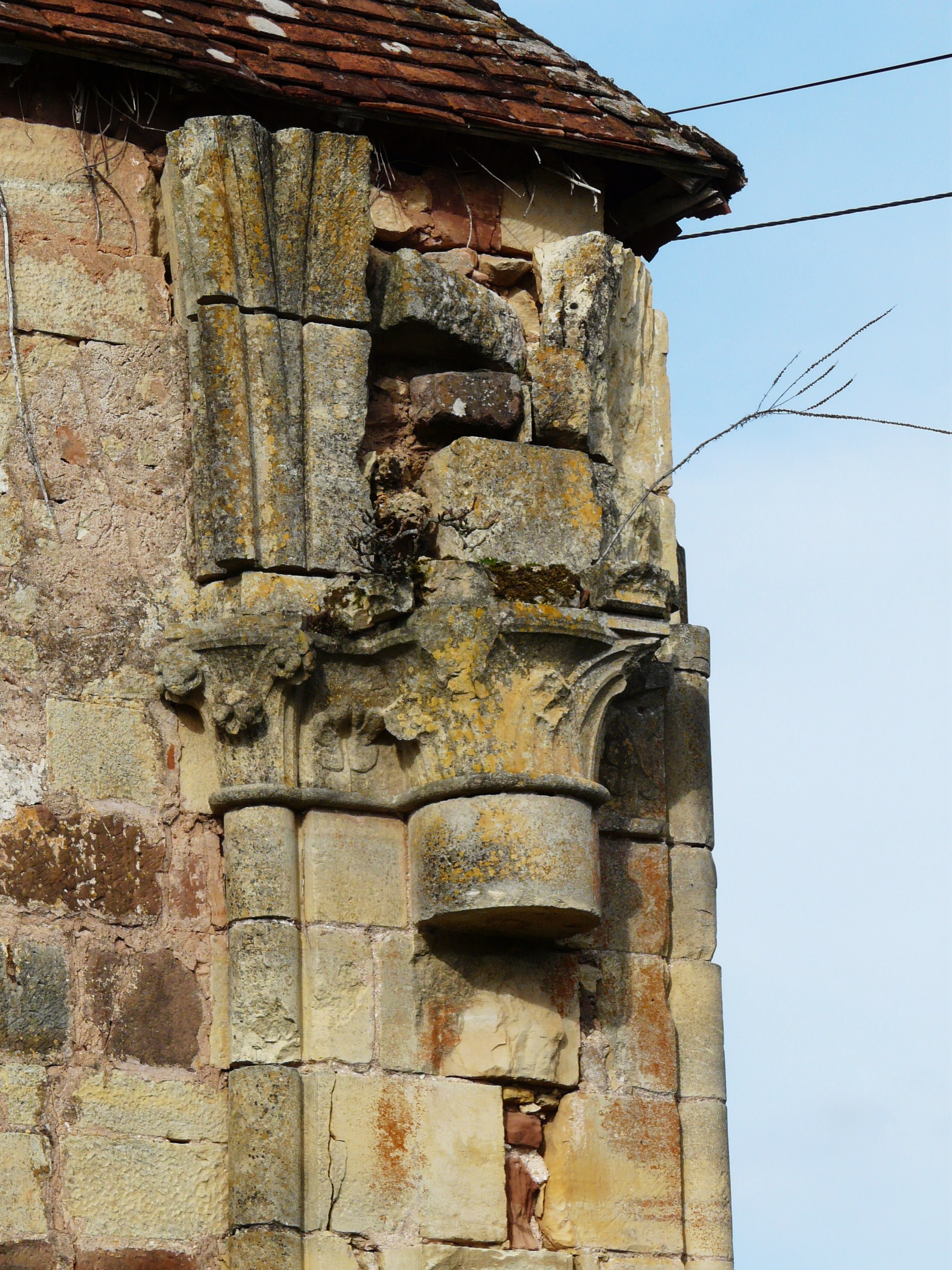
The remains of a capital

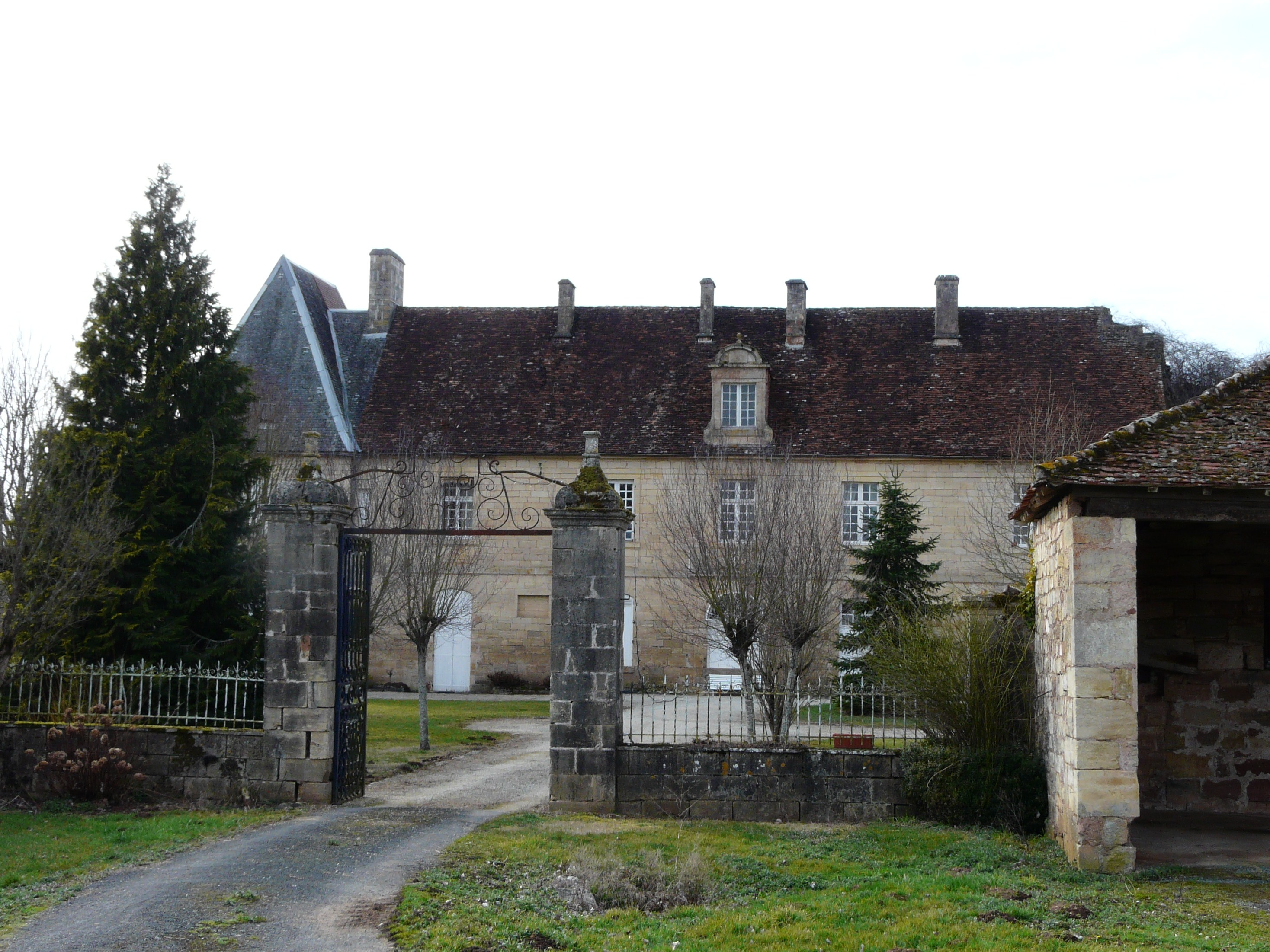
The dwellings

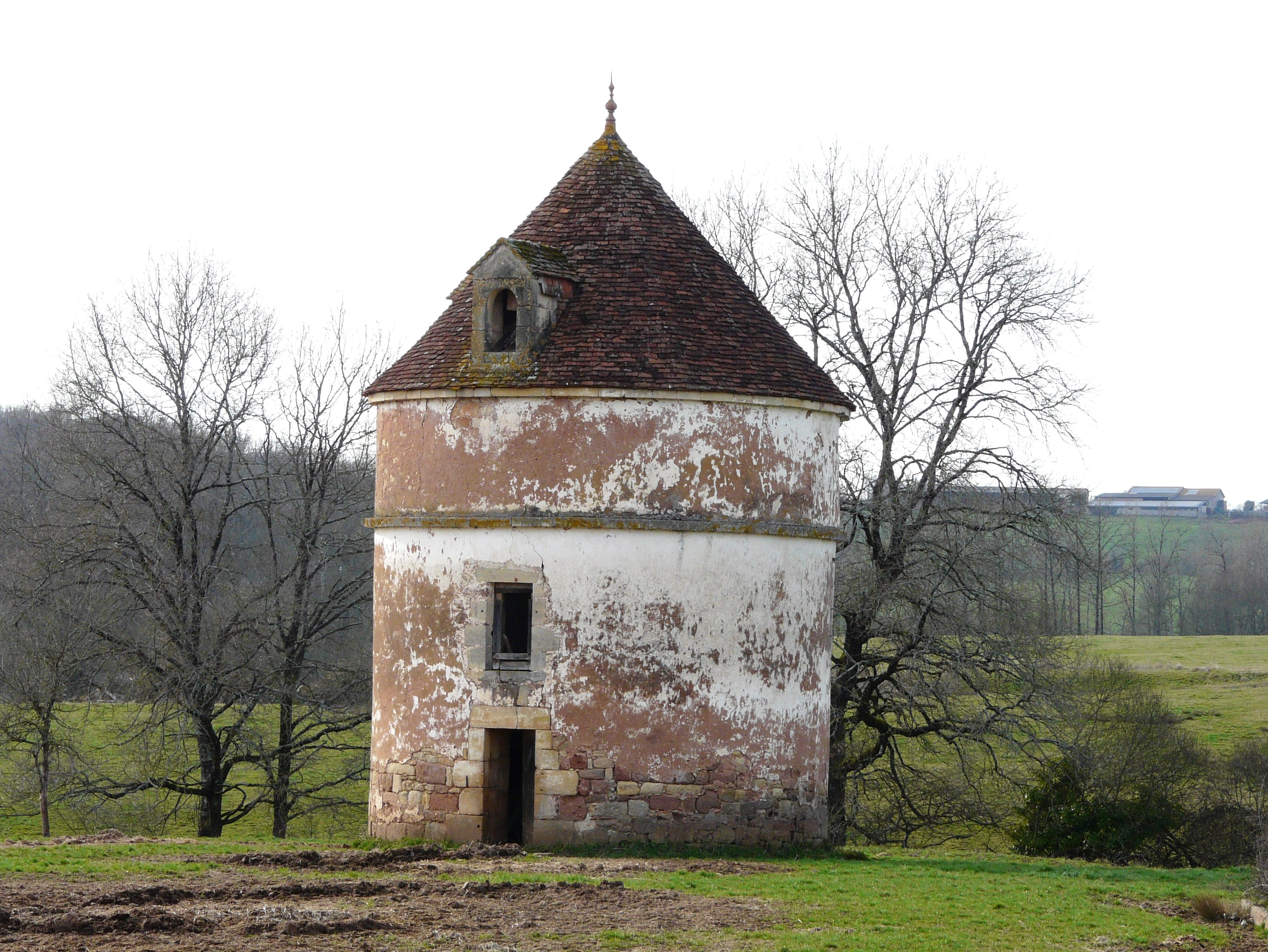
The dovecote

== See also ==
- List of Cistercian monasteries in France
