= Ardorel Abbey =

Abbey in Tarn, France

- Abbaye Notre-Dame d'Ardorel
- Location within France Location within Occitanie

Monastery information
- Other name: Ardorellum (Latin)
- Order: Cistercian (since 1124)
- Established: Late 11th century
- Dedication: Our Lady
- Diocese: Archdiocese of Albi

Site
- Location: Payrin-Augmontel, Tarn, France
- Coordinates: 43°32′31″N 2°20′31″E

Ardorel Abbey, formally the Abbey of Our Lady of Ardorel (Latin: Ardorellum; French: Abbaye Notre-Dame d'Ardorel), was a Benedictine then Cistercian monastery located in the modern-day commune of Payrin-Augmontel, Tarn, southwestern France. It was destroyed during the Wars of Religion.

== History ==
The abbey was founded in the late 11th-century and followed the Rule of Saint Benedict. The establishment was mentioned in 1114. The name Ardorel possibly meant "ploughed land".

In 1124, under the influence of Bernard Ato IV's wife Cecil of Provence, monks from Cadouin Abbey founded a Cistercian monastery at Ardorel under the supervision of abbot Élie. Little is known about the Benedictines who settled there before the Cistercians. Oddly, Ardorel was listed as a daughter of Pontigny very late, in 1147. Cecil of Provence made numerous donations to the abbey, and wished to be buried there. After Élie went back to Cadouin, the first abbot of Ardorel was Foulque.

Cecil's donations to the abbey were made either directly or indirectly through her vassals, the lords of Vintrou, Hautpoul and Miraval. The abbey was so well-known that even some Cathars like Jordan of Saissac, the son of Bertrand of Saissac, made donations to the abbey in 1283.

Very soon, the prospering abbey founded two daughter houses: Valmagne Abbey in 1138 –which thrived on its turn with up to 300 monks– and Sira in 1139. Moreover, Jau Abbey became a daughter house of Ardorel in 1162, even though it was founded earlier.

In the 14th century, the reputation and the prosperity of Ardorel started declining, especially when the commendatory regime was set up.

In 1586, during the French Wars of Religion, a relative of the abbot of Ardorel who secretly converted to Calvinism slipped inside the monastery and opened the doors for spadassins to slaughter the monks and throw their corpses into a well. A few survivors, who had left the monastery earlier, resumed monastic life in a grange in Lempaut owned by Ardorel. The once prosperous abbey is now ruined.

According to Janauschek, Ardorel Abbey had the Order number CCLXXIV (274).

== List of abbots ==
The abbots of Ardorel listed by Dom Claude de Vic and Dom Joseph Vaissette in Histoire générale du Languedoc.

1. Foulques, from Cadouin Abbey, first abbot of Ardorel, in 1133, mentioned in 1140.
2. Guiraud I, or Géraud, abbot in 1145 and 1147.
3. Jean I, abbot mentioned in 1148.
4. Guillaume I, abbot mentioned in 1151.
5. Jean II, abbot mentioned in 1155.
6. Pierre I, abbot mentioned in 1156, still alive 1170.
7. Bernard I, mentioned in 1173.
8. Pierre II, mentioned in 1176.
9. Guillaume II, fl. late 12th century.
10. G., 1226.
11. Élie I, mentioned in 1240 and 1248.
12. Bertrand I, mentioned in 1253 and 1255
13. Élie II, negotiated with Jordan of Saissac in 1258, mentioned in 1261.
14. Guiraud II, mentioned in 1263, 1268 and 1275.
15. Arnaud, 1277-1280.
16. Élie III, mentioned in 1283 and 1286.
17. Jean III de Cahors, 1290.
18. Bertrand III de Montlaur, 1294.
19. Bernard II de Peyrusse, 1308, 1309.
20. Jean IV Masson, from 1316 to 1336.
21. Durand I, 1337.
22. Jean V, 1340.
23. Durand II, 1341-1343.
24. Jean VI, abbot during a few months upon Durand II's death.
25. Durand III, 1344.
26. Pierre III, from 1350 to 1362.
27. Raymond, 1366–1391.
28. Jean VII Saturnin, 1397–1404.
29. Dieudonné I Coste, 1438–1445, died 1450.
30. Pierre IV Libaud, elected in 1450.
31. Jean VIII de Boisset, mentioned between 1457 and 1478.
32. Jean IX de Boisset, nephew of Jean VIII, died around 1539.
33. Antoine Pontaud, first commendatory abbot in 1539, until 1554.
34. Jean X de Mandagot, abbot in 1564. During his term, Protestants besieged and destroyed the abbey and killed virtually all the monks.
35. François d'Amboise, 1586-1590.
36. Louis I de Cardailhac, 1627.
37. Jean XI de Cardailhac, abbot from 1638 to 1666.
38. Michel Bancal de Pruines, abbot of Ardorel in 1688 (second time).
39. Louis II Girard de La Bournat-Clermont, brother and vicar general of Antoine-Girard de La Bournat, Bishop of Poitiers, appointed in 1688.

== See also ==
- List of Cistercian monasteries in France

== Bibliography ==
- Dom Claude de Vic; Dom Joseph Vaissette. Histoire générale de Languedoc (in French). Рипол Классик. pp. 616–617. ISBN 9785873434107.
- Morin-Sauvade, Hélène (2000). "La filiation de l'abbaye de Bonnevaux". Unanimité et Diversité Cisterciennes: Filiations, Réseaux, Relectures du XIIe Au XVIIe Siècle (in French). Saint-Étienne: Publications de l'université de Saint-Étienne: 103–120. ISBN 2-86272-177-8.
