= Trie (disambiguation) =

A trie is a specialized search tree data structure in computer science.

Trie may also refer to:

== Bodies of water ==
- Trie (river), river in Picardy

== People ==
- House of Trie, noble family

== Places in France ==
- Trie-sur-Baïse
  - Pays de Trie
- Trie-Château
  - Château de Trie
- Trie-la-Ville
- Sainte-Trie

== See also ==
- Tries (disambiguation)
