= Cadouin Abbey =

Abbey in Dordogne, France

Coordinates: 44.81°N 0.874°E

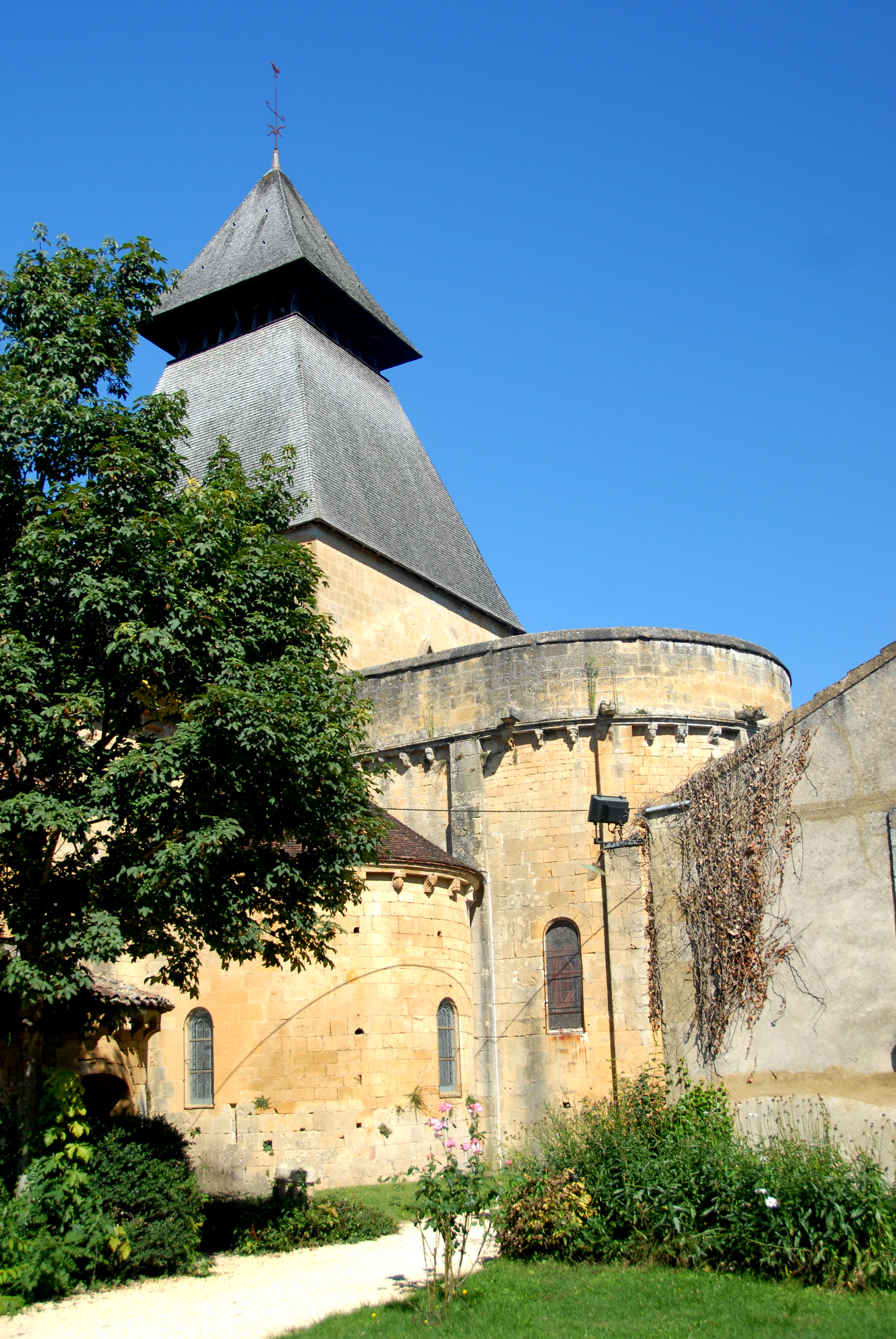
The former abbey church, Le Buisson-de-Cadouin

Cadouin Abbey (French: Abbaye de Cadouin or Abbaye Notre-Dame de la Nativité de Cadouin) was a Cistercian monastery founded as a hermitage in 1115 by Gerald of Salles, in the name of Robert of Arbrissel, in what is now the commune of Le Buisson-de-Cadouin in the Dordogne, south-west France.

In 1119 Cadouin was made an abbey under its first abbot, Henri, a monk of Pontigny Abbey, the second daughter house of Cîteaux Abbey, but seems to have remained independent of the Cistercian Order until around 1199.

Cadouin founded daughter houses of its own (Grandselve Abbey, Gondon Abbey, Bonnevaux Abbey in Poitou, Ardorel Abbey, La Faise Abbey and Saint-Marcel Abbey) which also became Cistercian, not necessarily at the same time as Cadouin itself.

At an uncertain date the monastery came into possession of what was believed to be the facecloth from the tomb of Christ (French: le Saint-Suaire de Cadouin), said to have been brought from Antioch by a priest of Périgord. In some traditional accounts the cloth is linked to the Bishop of Le Puy, Adhémar de Monteil, who died in 1098, but it is not documented in the possession of the abbey until 1214. It made Cadouin Abbey an important place of pilgrimage and brought it great prestige and wealth. Cadouin was also only 50 kilometres or so east of the Via Lemovicensis, one of the four main routes of the Way of Saint James through France. The wars of the 13th and 14th centuries however brought about a dramatic collapse in the number of pilgrimages.

In 1791 the abbey, which by then had only four monks, was dissolved in the French Revolution. Its rich possessions were looted and its library was burnt in the village square. The abbey church however still stands.

The Abbaye de Cadouin also contains one of the oldest claimed burial shrouds of Jesus, but textile examination in 1934 concluded that the fabric was woven in Fatmid Egypt during the 11th century.

== Sources ==
- Marcel Aubert, Cadouin, in Congrès archéologique de France. 90e session. Périgueux. 1927, pp. 176–190, Société Française d'Archéologie, Paris, 1928 (online)
- Amis de Cadouin, from 1994 : Actes des colloques annuels, renseignements au cloître de Cadouin.
- Brigitte and Gilles Delluc, "Le suaire de Cadouin: une toile brodée", in Bulletin de la Société historique et archéologique du Périgord, 110, 1983, pp. 162–179, 10 fig.
- ditto, Cadouin. Une aventure cistercienne en Périgord, PLB Éditeur, Le Bugue, 1990
- ditto, "L'archéologie cistercienne de Cadouin", in Bull. de la Soc. hist. et arch. du Périgord, 125, 1998, pp. 383–405, illustrations and plan
- ditto, "Le Suaire de Cadouin et son frère le voile de sainte Anne d’Apt (Vaucluse). Deux pièces exceptionnelles d’archéologie textile", in Bull. de la Soc. hist. et arch. du Périgord, 128, 2001, pp. 607–626
- ditto, Visiter l'abbaye de Cadouin, Sud Ouest, 2008, 32 p., with illustrations
- Jacques Gardelles, L'abbaye de Cadouin, pp. 146–178, in Congrès archéologique de France. 137e session. Périgord Noir. 1979, Société Française d'Archéologie, Paris, 1982
- Jacques Gardelles, Cadouin. Le cloître, in Aquitaine gothique, Picard éditeur? Paris, 1992, pp. 121–126; ISBN 978-2-7084-0421-2
- Philippe Oudin, Cadouin. L'abbaye de jouvence, pp. 34–39, Le Festin, numéro spécial L'Aquitaine monumentale, septembre 2004 ISBN 2-915262-12-8
- Thomas Falmagne, Alison Stones, Christelle Cazaux-Kowalski, Yolanta Zaluska, Les manuscrits de l'abbaye de Cadouin, Archives départementales de la Dordogne, Périgueux, 2015 ISBN 978-2-86024-024-6
- C. Douais, IV. Charte de Louis XI en faveur de Cadouin (avril 1482), pp. 205–228, in Annales du Midi: revue archéologique, historique et philologique de la France méridionale, année 1896, Volume 8, No 30 (online)
- Jean Maubourguet, Le suaire de Cadouin, pp. 348–363, in Bulletin de la Société Historique et Archéologique du Périgord, 1936, vol. 63 (online)
- Abbé François-Georges Audierne, Notice historique sur l'abbaye de Cadouin, son église et ses cloîtres, imprimerie Dupont, Périgueux, 1840; p. 34 (online)
- Michelle Fournié, Le saint suaire de Cadouin et son dépôt à Toulouse à la fin du Moyen Âge, pp. 127–162; Mémoires de la Société archéologique du Midi de la France, 2011, vol. 71 (online)
