= Abbey of Saint-Léonard des Chaumes =

Former Cistercian monastery in Aunis, France

Saint-Léonard des Chaumes
- Sanctus Leonardus de Calmis
- Location within Charente-Maritime Location within Nouvelle-Aquitaine
- Interactive map of Saint-Léonard des Chaumes

Monastery information
- Order: Cistercian (since 1168)
- Established: 1036
- Mother house: Bœuil Abbey (originally); Billon Abbey
- Diocese: Roman Catholic Diocese of La Rochelle and Saintes

People
- Founder: Odo of Gascony

Site
- Location: Dompierre-sur-Mer, Aunis, Kingdom of France
- Coordinates: 46°10′12″N 01°04′23″W

The Abbey of Saint-Léonard des Chaumes (Latin: Sanctus Leonardus de Calmis) was a Cistercian monastery in Dompierre-sur-Mer in the province of Aunis in the Kingdom of France. It was destroyed in the 18th century.

== History ==
The abbey was probably founded in 1036 by Odo, Count of Gascony. The establishment was originally poor —chaumes meant "uncultivated land" in Old French. In 1168, the establishment, which had been a priory for a century, joined the Cistercian Order and became a daughter house of Bœuil Abbey in Limousin. Later, it was handed over to Billon Abbey.

Like many other abbeys in the 15th-century, Saint-Léonard des Chaumes and its goods were placed under the authority of a layman for whom the monastery was a source of revenue rather than a place of worship. Vincent de Paul briefly served as commander of the abbey from 1610. At this time, the commendatory regime and the war (the first Siege of La Rochelle) already had visible negative consequences. Vicent de Paul resigned from commendatory office in 1616.

In 1723, the abbey was mentioned as completely destroyed.

According to Janauschek, the abbey had the order number CCCC (400).
