= Bertran de Born =

Occitan troubadour

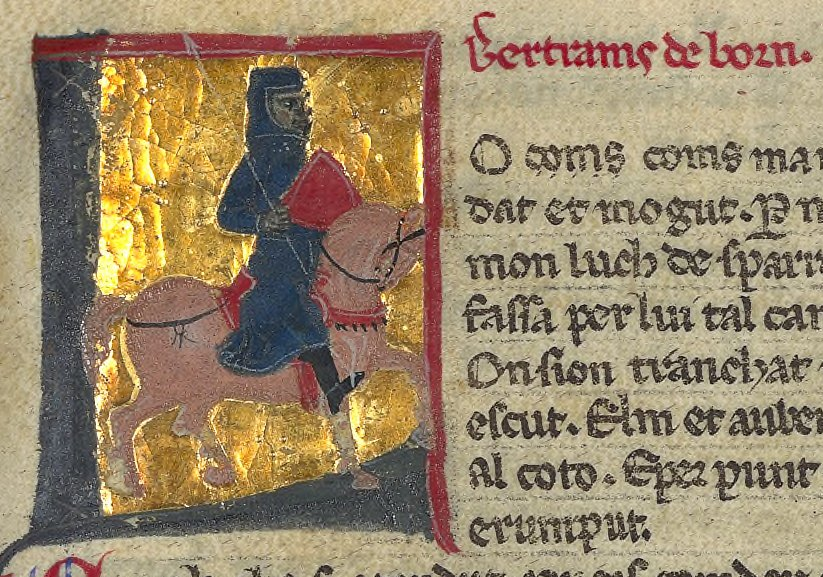
- Bertran as a knight, from a 13th-century chansonnier
- Born: 1140s Limousin
- Died: 1202-1215; Dalon
- Occupation: Baron
- Known for: One of the major Occitan troubadours of the twelfth century.

Bertran de Born (Occitan: [beɾˈtɾan de ˈbɔɾn]; 1140s – by 1215) was a baron from the Limousin in France, and one of the major Occitan troubadours of the 12th-13th century. He composed love songs (cansos) but was better known for his political songs (sirventes). He was involved in revolts against Richard I and then Phillip II. He married twice and had five children. In his final years, he became a monk.

== Early life ==
Bertran de Born was the eldest son of Bertran de Born, lord of Hautefort (Occitan: Autafòrt), and his wife Ermengardis. He had two younger brothers, Constantine and Itier. His father died in 1178, and Bertran succeeded him as lord of Hautefort. By this time, he was already married to his first wife, Raimonda, and had two sons.

Hautefort lies at the border between the Limousin and Périgord. As a result, Bertran became involved in the conflicts of the sons of Henry II Plantagenet. He was also fighting for control of Hautefort.

According to the feudal custom of his region, he was not the only lord of Hautefort, but held it jointly with his brothers. Other cases of co-seigneuries were known among the troubadours, the most famous being that of the "four troubadours of Ussel", three brothers and a cousin, and that of Raimon de Miraval and his brothers. Bertran's struggle, especially with his brother Constantine, is at the heart of his poetry, which is dominated by political topics.

== Career ==
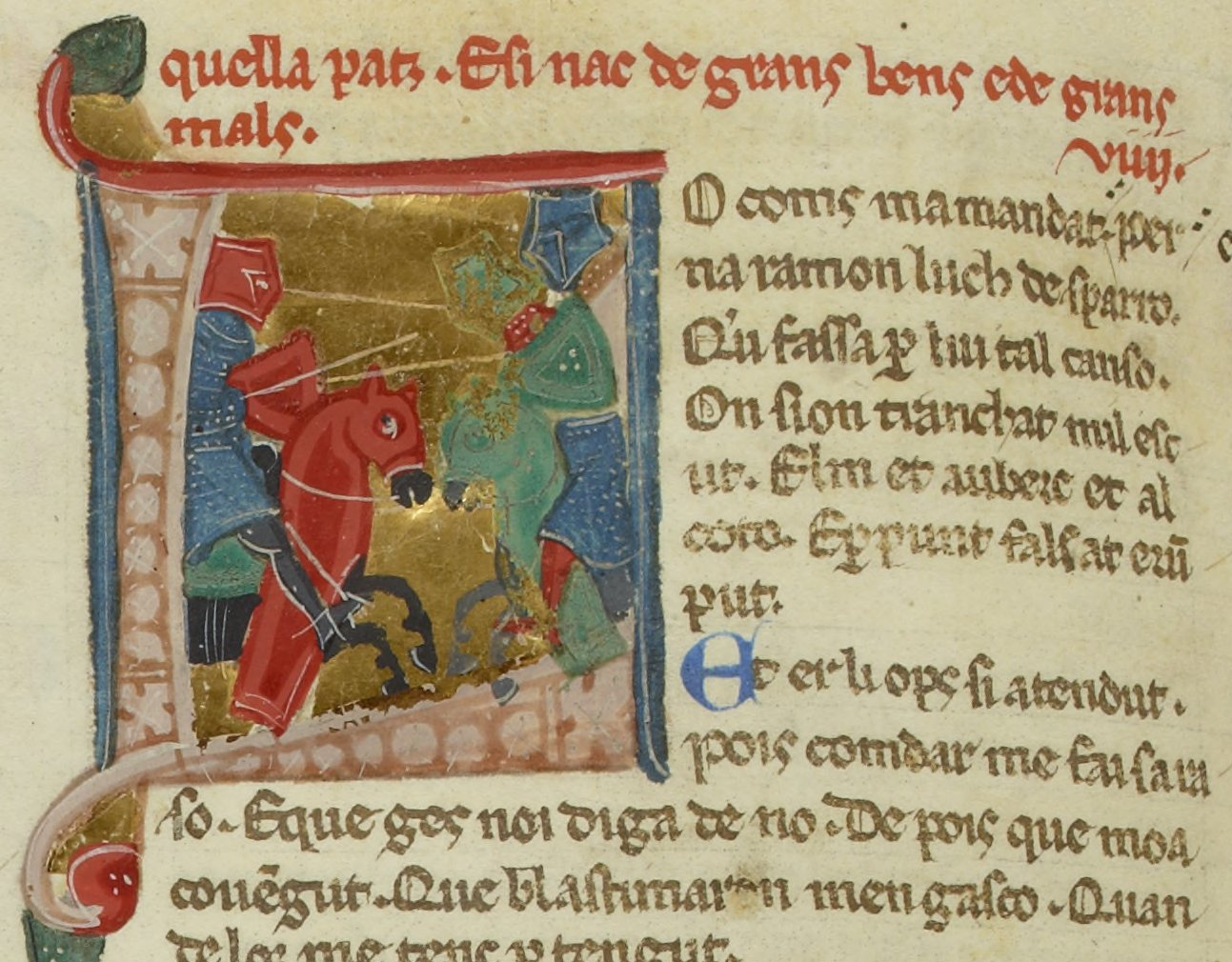
Bertran jousting, from a 13th-century manuscript

His first datable work is a sirventes (political or satirical song) of 1181, but it is clear from this he already had a reputation as a poet. In 1182, he was present at his overlord Henry II of England's court at Argentan. That same year, he had joined in Henry the Young King's revolt against his younger brother, Richard, Count of Poitou and Duke of Aquitaine. He wrote songs encouraging Aimar V of Limoges and others to rebel, and took the oath against Richard at Limoges. His brother Constantine took the opposing side, and Bertran drove him out of the castle in July.

Henry the Young King, whom Bertran had praised and criticised in his poems, died on campaign in June 1183 in Martel. Bertran wrote a planh (lament), in his memory, Mon chan fenisc ab dol et ab maltraire. (Another planh for Henry, Si tuit li dol e.l plor e.l marrimen, formerly attributed to Bertran, is now thought to be the work of Rigaut de Berbezill). In his punitive campaign against the rebels, Richard, aided by Alfonso II of Aragon, besieged Hautefort and gave it to Constantine de Born. Henry II, however, is reported to have been moved by Bertran's lament for his son, and returned the castle to the poet. Constantine seems to have become a mercenary.

Bertran was reconciled also with Richard, whom he supported in turn against Philip II of France. At various times, he sought to exploit the dissensions among the Angevins in order to keep his independence. He gave them senhals (nicknames): Henry the Young King was Mariniers (Sailor), Geoffrey of Brittany was Rassa, and Richard, Oc-e-Non (Yes-and-No). He commemorated Geoffrey's death in the planh, A totz dic que ja mais non voil. He had contact with a number of other troubadours and also with the Northern French trouvère, Conon de Béthune, whom he addressed as Mon Ysombart.

Although he composed a few cansos (love songs), Bertran de Born was predominantly a master of the sirventes. Be.m platz lo gais temps de pascor, which revels in warfare, was translated by Ezra Pound:

...We shall see battle axes and swords, a-battering colored haumes and a-hacking through shields at entering melee; and many vassals smiting together, whence there run free the horses of the dead and wrecked. And when each man of prowess shall be come into the fray he thinks no more of (merely) breaking heads and arms, for a dead man is worth more than one taken alive.

I tell you that I find no such savor in eating butter and sleeping, as when I hear cried "On them!" and from both sides hear horses neighing through their head-guards, and hear shouted "To aid! To aid!" and see the dead with lance truncheons, the pennants still on them, piercing their sides.

Barons! put in pawn castles, and towns, and cities before anyone makes war on us.

Papiol, be glad to go speedily to "Yea and Nay", and tell him there's too much peace about.

When Richard (by then King) and Philip delayed setting out on the Third Crusade, he chided them in songs praising the heroic defence of Tyre by Conrad of Montferrat (Folheta, vos mi prejatz que eu chan and Ara sai eu de pretz quals l'a plus gran). When Richard was released from captivity after being suspected of Conrad's murder, Bertran welcomed his return with Ar ven la coindeta sazos. Ironically, one of Bertran's sources of income was from the market of Châlus-Cabrol, where Richard was fatally wounded in 1199.

== Later years and death ==
Widowed for the second time c. 1196, Bertran became a monk and entered the Cistercian abbey of Dalon at Sainte-Trie in the Dordogne region. He had made numerous grants to the abbey over the years. His last datable song was written in 1198. He ceases to appear in charters after 1202, and was certainly dead by 1215, when there is a record of a payment for a candle for his tomb.

== Works ==
His œuvre consists of about 47 works, 36 unambiguously attributed to him in the manuscripts, and 11 uncertain attributions. Several melodies survive, and some of his songs have been recorded by Sequentia, Gérard Zucchetto and his Troubadours Art Ensemble, and the Martin Best Mediæval Ensemble, who released an album of songs by "Dante Troubadours". His idealized composite of the dompna soiseubuda/domna soisseubuda (ideal lady) served as the inspiration for Elias de Barjols' composite of the ideal courtly knight.

== Family ==
Bertran de Born married twice. By his first wife, Raimonda, he had two sons (both knighted in 1192) and a daughter:

- Bertran, also a troubadour, still living in 1223.
- Itier, who died in 1237.
- Aimelina, who married Seguin de Lastours.

By his second wife, Philippa, he had two more sons:

- Constantine, who became a monk at Dalon with his father.
- Bertran the Younger, who was still living in 1252.

== Later literary image ==
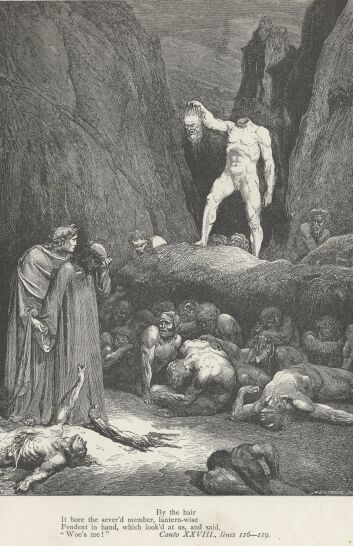
Doré's illustration of Bertran in Hell, from Dante's L'Inferno

According to his later vida (a romanticised short biography attached to his songs), Henry II believed Bertran had fomented the rebellion of his son Henry the Young King. As a result, Dante Alighieri portrayed him in the Inferno as a sower of schism, punished in the ninth bolgia of the eighth circle of Hell (Canto XXVIII), carrying his severed head like a lantern. Gustave Doré depicts this in his illustrations to the Divine Comedy.

Dante's depiction of him influenced later literary works. In her epic poem Cœur de Lion (1822), Eleanor Anne Porden portrays him fomenting discord in the Third Crusade and, because of his remorse over his involvement with Richard's imprisonment, becoming a hermit. He also figures as a minor character in Maurice Hewlett's novel The Life and Death of Richard Yea-and-Nay (1900), depicted unflatteringly. He is described as "a man of hot blood, fumes and rages", with "a grudging spirit". One character dismisses him thus: "Great poet he was, great thief, and a silly fool."

His memory was better served by Ezra Pound, who translated some of his songs and also based several original poems around him and his works, notably Na Audiart (1908), Sestina: Altaforte (1909), and Near Périgord (1915). There are also allusions to him in some of the Cantos. Via the influence of Pound's Na Audiart, he is also mentioned in Sorley MacLean's poem, A' Bhuaile Ghreine (The Sunny Fold).

He was the subject of a 1936 play Bertran de Born by Jean Valmy-Baisse, to which Darius Milhaud wrote incidental music. He later reworked the music into his Suite provençale.

Paul Auster mentions De Born in his novel Invisible (2009), where the main character meets a Frenchman named Born, and corrects a translation of one of Bertran's war poems. This appeared before as a translation by Paul Auster, in The Nation.
