= Gondon Abbey =

Abbey in Lot-et-Garonne, France

- Abbaye de Gondon
- Location within France

Monastery information
- Other names: Gondom; Gondonium
- Order: Cistercian
- Established: 1123
- Disestablished: 1791
- Mother house: Cadouin Abbey

Site
- Location: Monbahus, Lot-et-Garonne, Aquitaine, France
- Coordinates: 44.5178°N 0.5339°E
- Public access: No (private agricultural property)

Gondon Abbey (also Gondom; French: Abbaye de Gondon; Latin: Gondonium) is a former Cistercian monastery in Monbahus, Lot-et-Garonne, Aquitaine, France, about 21 kilometres to the north-west of Villeneuve-sur-Lot.

== History ==
The abbey was probably founded in 1123 with an endowment from the lords of Lauzun, as a daughter house of Cadouin Abbey, of the filiation of Pontigny. In 1147 the community became the mother house of Fontguilhem Abbey, founded in 1124, when it affiliated itself to the Cistercian Order.

The prosperous and influential abbey, noted for its wine production, was weakened by the Hundred Years' War in the 14th century, and the imposition of commendatory abbots and the French Wars of Religion in the 16th century.

It was suppressed in 1791 during the French Revolution.

== Buildings ==
The site, now used for agricultural purposes, contains some remnants of the conventual buildings, including a dovecote.

== Sources ==
- Peugniez, Bernard, 2001: Routier cistercien. Abbayes et sites. France, Belgique, Luxembourg, Suisse (new expanded edition, p. 29). Moisenay: Éditions Gaud ISBN 2-84080-044-6
