= Bœuil Abbey =

Destroyed monastery in Limousin, France

Abbey of Our Lady, Bœuil
- Abbaye Notre-Dame de Bœuil
- Location within Nouvelle-Aquitaine
- Interactive map of Abbey of Our Lady, Bœuil

Monastery information
- Other names: Le Beuil; Bulium (Latin)
- Order: Cistercian Order
- Established: 1123
- Disestablished: 1790
- Dedication: Our Lady
- Diocese: Diocese of Limoges

People
- Founder: Ramnulphe de Nieul

Architecture
- Functional status: Daughter house of Dalon Abbey, line of Pontigny Abbey; Mother house of the Abbey of Saint-Léonard des Chaumes
- Groundbreaking: 1123

Site
- Location: Veyrac, Limousin, France
- Coordinates: 45.902439°N 1.060456°E
- Visible remains: None

Bœuil Abbey (French: Abbaye de Bœuil; Latin: Bulium), also called Our Lady Abbey (Abbaye Notre-Dame), was a Cistercian monastery in Veyrac, Limousin, France. It was destroyed during the French Revolution.

== History ==
The abbey was probably founded in 1123 by Ramnulphe de Nieul, Dean of the chapter of Dorat, as the daughter house of Dalon Abbey. The latter took on the Cistercian Rule in 1126, in line with Pontigny Abbey; so did Bœuil. Bœuil prospered and founded a daughter house at Saint-Léonard des Chaumes in the province of Aunis.

Like many other abbeys in the 15th century, Bœuil Abbey and its goods were placed under the authority of a layman for whom the monastery was a source of revenue rather than a place of worship. Despite several attempts of recovery, the abbey continued to decline.

In 1790, the Revolutionaries ousted the only remaining monk and destroyed the abbey. Although the abbey was still visible on the cadastral plan in 1808, the site was turned into a quarry in the 19th century. No remnants of the abbey are visible today.

According to Janauschek, Bœuil Abbey had the order number CCCLXXVII (377).

== See also ==
- List of Cistercian monasteries in France

== Bibliography ==
- Barrière, Bernadette (1998). Moines en Limousin : L'aventure cistercienne (in French). Limoges: Presses universitaires de Limoges. ISBN 9782842871031.
- Janauschek, Leopold (1877). Originum Cisterciensium Tomus I in quo praemissis congregationum domiciliis adjectisque tabulis chronologico-genealogicis veterum abbatiarum a monachis habitatarum fundationes ad fidem antiquissimorum fontium primus descripsit (in Latin). L.J. Vindobonae.
