= Bonnevaux Abbey =

Abbey in Isère, France

Coordinates: 45°27′23″N 5°09′18″E

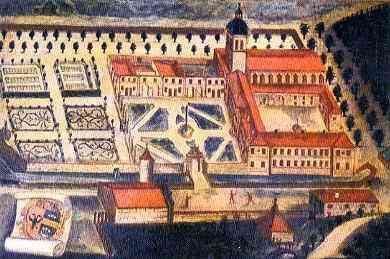
Anonymous painting of the abbey, 1750

Bonnevaux Abbey (French: Abbaye de Bonnevaux; Latin: Bonae Valles) is a former Cistercian monastery located in Lieudieu near Villeneuve-de-Marc in the Isère department of France, situated within the Dauphiné region. It is positioned 25 kilometres east of Vienne approximately 6 kilometres south-east of Saint-Jean-de-Bournay, on the northern perimeter of the Forêt de Bonnevaux.

== History ==
Bonnevaux Abbey was established in 1117 by Guy of Burgundy, also known as Guy of Vienne, who was the Archbishop of Vienne and later became Pope Callixtus II. It was founded as the sixth daughter house of Cîteaux Abbey.

The abbey attained wealth through various privileges and endowments, including a number from the Dauphin, and possessed fifteen granges in Villeneuve-de-Marc, Saint-Georges-d'Espéranche, Beaurepaire, Primarette, Sainte-Anne-sur-Gervonde and Diémoz. It founded numerous daughter houses, all in France: Mazan Abbey, Montpeyroux Abbey, Tamié Abbey, Léoncel Abbey, Valmagne Abbey, Sauveréal Abbey, Valbenoîte Abbey and Valcroissant Abbey. The women's monasteries of Laval-Bénite Abbey and Bonnecombe Abbey were also under the jurisdiction of Bonnevaux.

During the 16th-century Wars of Religion, the abbey endured significant hardships. In 1576, it was plundered by Huguenots, resulting in the devastation of the church. The tumultuous period of the French Revolution led to the dissolution of the abbey, further looting, the igniting of fires, and ultimately, its utilization as a source of stone for building materials.

== Buildings and appurtenances ==
A painting of about 1750 shows the precinct layout, with the church and its prominent western tower to the north, and the conventual buildings to the south of it. On the site of the monastery a memorial, consisting of a cross with an inscribed tablet, was set up in 1933 by Tamié Abbey.

In 1938 the foundation stones were used for the construction of the church at Villeneuve-de-Marc. Today there are no visible remains of the abbey itself; an outlying grange with three aisles survives.

In 2017 the World Community for Christian Meditation purchased and began to renovate the former Cistercian abbey.

== Citations ==
- Peugniez, Bernard, nd: Routier cistercien (2nd ed., p. 445). Moisenay: Editions Gaud. ISBN 2-84080-044-6
- Gerin, Patrick Gerin, and Pierry, Patrick: Les Granges à trois nefs de l'abbaye cistercienne de Bonnevaux en Dauphiné (Bulletin de la Société des amis de Vienne, Nr. 88, fasc. 1, 1993, pp. 22–25)
- Bernard, Michel, 2000: La Fin de l'abbaye de Bonnevaux au début de la Révolution française (Chroniques rivoises, n.E. 30, Nov. 2000, pp. 39–44)
- Chuzel, M.F., nd: Histoire de l’Abbaye de Bonnevaux (1932 edn., reprinted 2004). Ed. Lettres de France
