= Gerald of Salles =

French monastic reformer

Gerald of Salles (Note: Also known as: Gerald of Salles, Gerard of Salles, Geraud of Salles, Gerald de Salles, Gérard de Salles, Géraud de Salles, Giraud de Salles, Gerald of Sales, Giraud de Sales, Gérald de Salis, Giraldus de Salis, and Giraud de Salis.) (c.1055 or 1070 – 1120) was a French monastic reformer from Salles, Lot-et-Garonne near Bergerac, Dordogne in the south-west of France. His feast day is on April 20.

== Monastic reformer ==
Gerald of Salles was ruler of Salles near Bergerac in Dordogne, France. According to a tradition going back to his Vita, he became a canon regular of St. Avitus, from the diocese of Périgueux, and the monastery of Saint-Avit,

A friend of Robert of Arbrissel, and follower of Vitalis of Savigny; like Bernard of Thiron, Gerard set up Benedictine houses, or groups of hermits, mostly in the west of France, and was important in the later spread of the Cistercians, from their beginnings in Burgundy. Following a spirituality very close to that of the Cistercians, Gerald of Salles monasteries progressively joined them.

== Foundations ==
Most of Gerald's foundations were south of the Loire; all were founded under the Rule of St. Benedict. Among his attributed foundations, of which there are traditionally said to be nine, were:

- Absie Abbey (1120)
- Sainte-Marie d'Ardorel
- Belleperche Abbey
- Abbaye Notre-Dame de l'Assomption du Bournet (1113)
- Cadouin Abbey (c.1115)
- L’abbaye Notre-Dame des Châtelliers (1119)
- Dalon Abbey (1114)
- Fontdouce Abbey (1117)
- Grandselve Abbey (1114)
- Valmagne Abbey

The Abbaye du Pin à Béruges is also attributed, in a chronicle. Feuillant Abbey may have been started by a group of monks from Dalon.

Loc-Dieu Abbey belonged to a series of monasteries reformed by Gerald of Salles.

Like Grandselve, the monastery of Sainte-Marie d'Ardorel near Albi, and its daughter house, Valmagne Abbey, were established as independent Benedictine houses before being absorbed into the Cistercian system.

== Veneration ==
He was beatified in 1249, and was reburied in a marble tomb, south of the altar at Châtelliers Abbey.

== Sources ==
- Marie-Odile Lenglet, L'implantation cistercienne dans la Marche Limousine, de Géraud de Sales à saint Bernard, MSSNAC, vol. 46 (1997), p. 258-268
- Marie-Odile Lenglet, La biographie du bienheureux Géraud de Sales, in Cîteaux. Commentani Cisterciences, 29, 1978, p. 7-40
- Marie-Odile Lenglet, Un pauvre du Christ, Géraud de Sales dit Saint Giraud, Cîteaux Commentarii Cistercienses, t. XXIX, 1978, pp. 5–40
- Marie-Odile Lenglet, Géraud de Salles, ses fondations monastiques, leur évolution vers l’ordre cistercien à la fin de XIIème siècle, Bulletin de la Société Historique et Archéologique du Périgord, t. CXIV, 1987, pp. 33–50.
- (in French) Biography of Giraud de Salles
