= Lieudieu =

- Commune
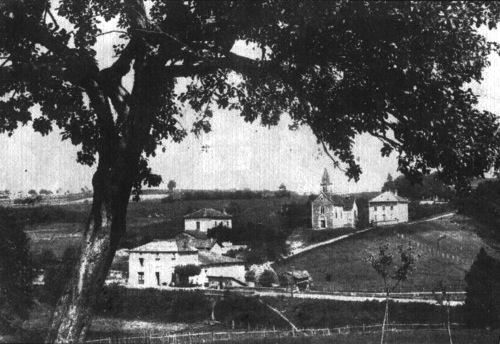
- Lieudieu in the early 20th century
- Location of Lieudieu
- Location within France Location within Auvergne-Rhône-Alpes
- Coordinates: 45°27′33″N 5°10′56″E
- Country: France
- Region: Auvergne-Rhône-Alpes
- Department: Isère
- Arrondissement: Vienne
- Canton: Bièvre
- Intercommunality: Bièvre Isère

Government
  - Mayor (2020–2026): Guy Gerin
- Area^{1}: 5.94 km^{2} (2.29 sq mi)
- Highest elevation: 543 m (1,781 ft)
- Lowest elevation: 452 m (1,483 ft)
- Population (2023): 345
  - Density: 58.1/km^{2} (150/sq mi)
- Time zone: UTC+01:00 (CET)
  - Summer (DST): UTC+02:00 (CEST)
- INSEE/Postal code: 38211 /38440
- ^{1} French Land Register data, which excludes lakes, ponds, glaciers > 1 km^{2} (0.386 sq mi or 247 acres) and river estuaries.

Lieudieu (French pronunciation: [ljødjø]) is a commune in the Isère department in southeastern France.

The former Cistercian monastery Bonnevaux Abbey was located here until its destruction in the French Revolution.

== Population ==
Historical population
Year	Pop.	±% p.a.
1968	127	—
1975	132	+0.55%
1982	178	+4.36%
1990	181	+0.21%
1999	246	+3.47%
2007	266	+0.98%
2012	330	+4.41%
2017	341	+0.66%
2023	345	+0.19%
Source: INSEE

== See also ==
- Communes of the Isère department
