= Tries =

Tries may refer to the plural form of:

- Try (rugby)
- Try, a conversion (gridiron football)
- Trie, a prefix tree in computer science
- Life (video games), also sometimes called tries
