= Villeneuve-de-Marc =

- Commune
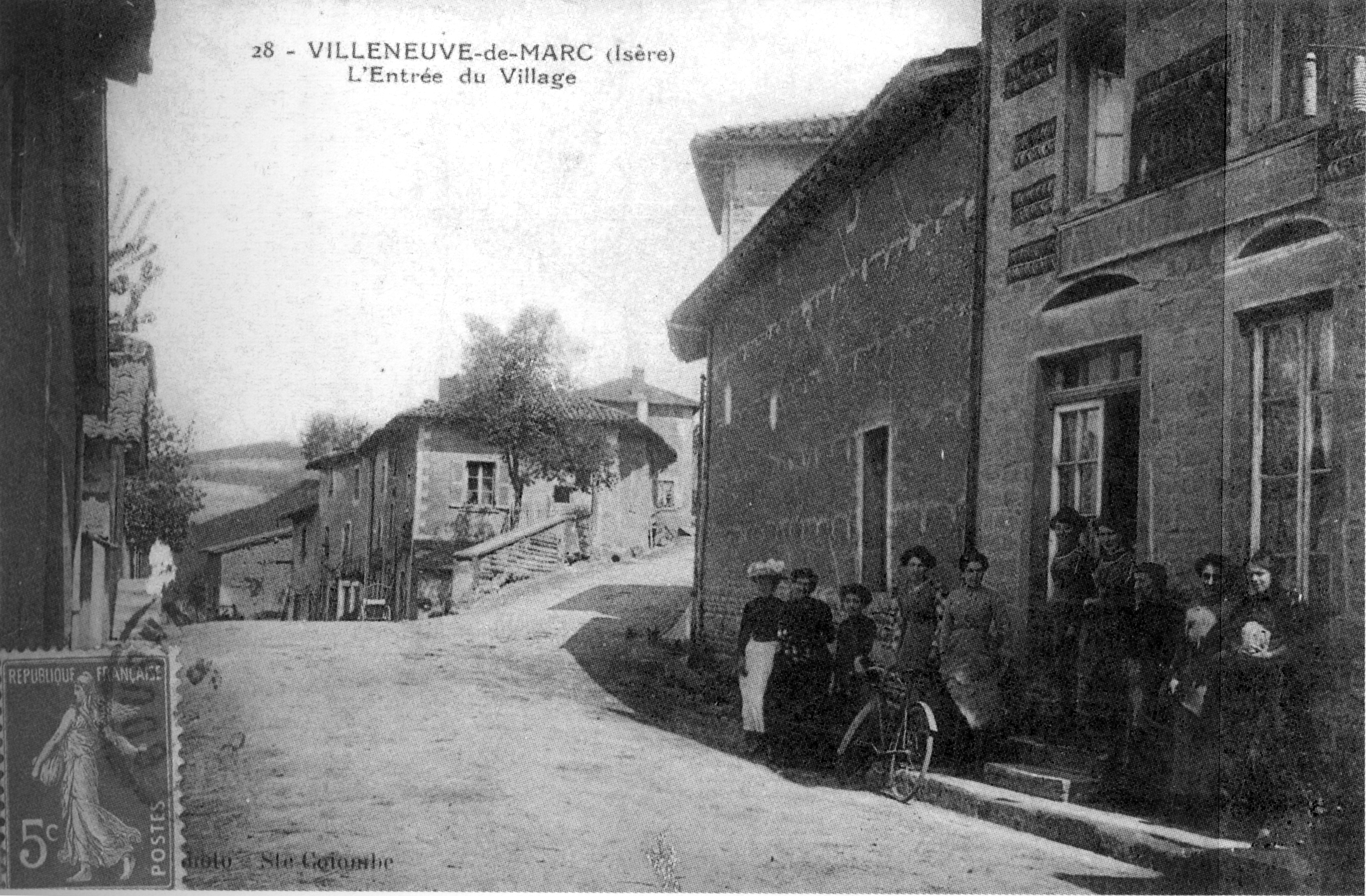
- Villeneuve-de-Marc in 1910
- Location of Villeneuve-de-Marc
- Location within France Location within Auvergne-Rhône-Alpes
- Coordinates: 45°28′36″N 5°06′10″E
- Country: France
- Region: Auvergne-Rhône-Alpes
- Department: Isère
- Arrondissement: Vienne
- Canton: Bièvre

Government
  - Mayor (2020–2026): Gilles Dussault
- Area^{1}: 26.18 km^{2} (10.11 sq mi)
- Elevation: 395 m (1,296 ft)
- Highest elevation: 524 m (1,719 ft)
- Lowest elevation: 344 m (1,129 ft)
- Population (2023): 1,154
  - Density: 44.08/km^{2} (114.2/sq mi)
- Time zone: UTC+01:00 (CET)
  - Summer (DST): UTC+02:00 (CEST)
- INSEE/Postal code: 38555 /38440
- ^{1} French Land Register data, which excludes lakes, ponds, glaciers > 1 km^{2} (0.386 sq mi or 247 acres) and river estuaries.

Villeneuve-de-Marc (French pronunciation: [vilnœv də maʁk]) is a commune in the Isère department in southeastern France.

== Population ==
Historical population
Year	Pop.	±% p.a.
1968	740	—
1975	701	−0.77%
1982	782	+1.57%
1990	777	−0.08%
1999	881	+1.41%
2007	1,176	+3.68%
2012	1,141	−0.60%
2017	1,147	+0.10%
2023	1,154	+0.10%
Source: INSEE

== See also ==
- Communes of the Isère department
