= Monbahus =

- Commune
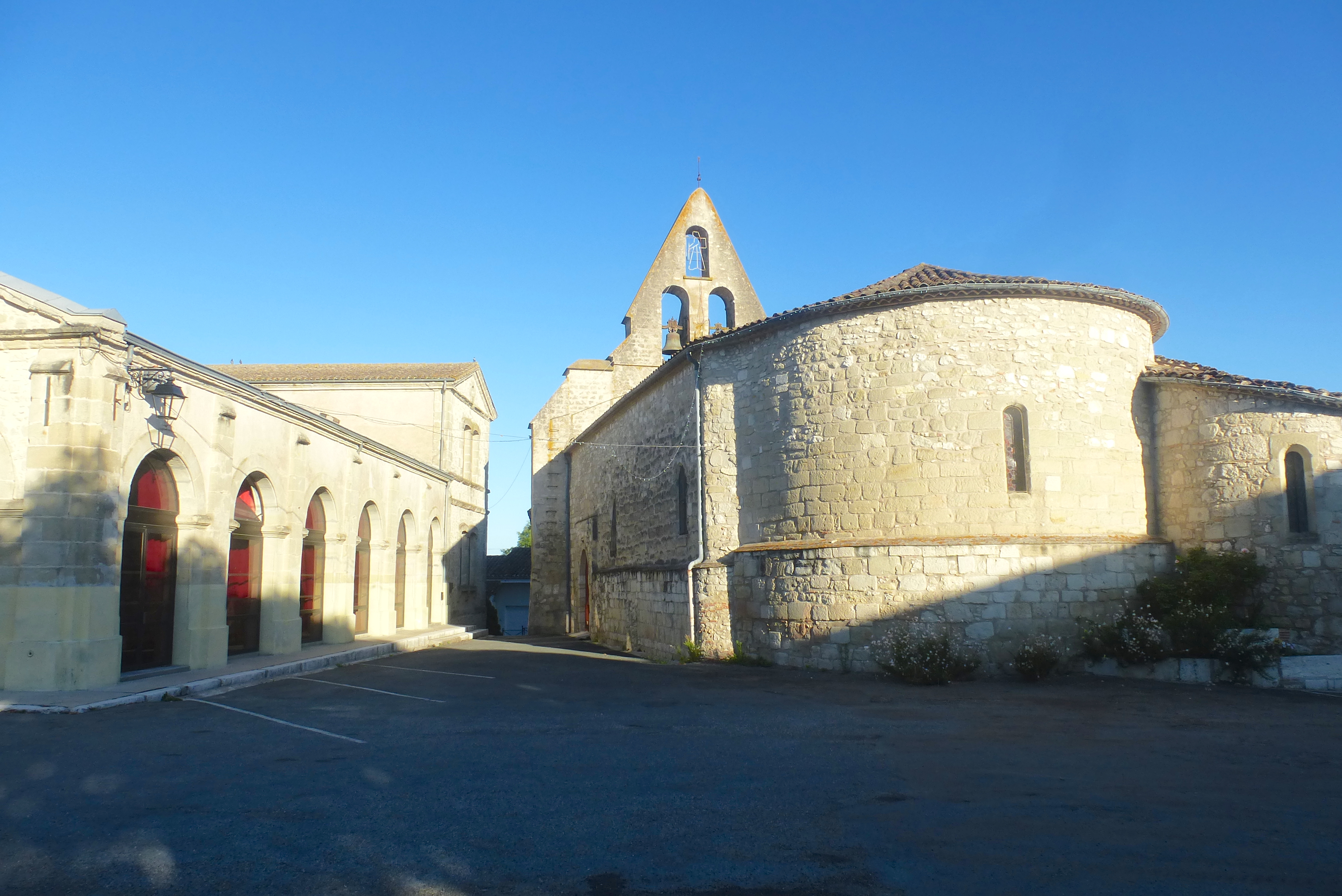

- Coat of arms
- Location of Monbahus
- Location within France Location within Nouvelle-Aquitaine
- Coordinates: 44°32′57″N 0°32′09″E
- Country: France
- Region: Nouvelle-Aquitaine
- Department: Lot-et-Garonne
- Arrondissement: Villeneuve-sur-Lot
- Canton: Le Haut agenais Périgord
- Intercommunality: Bastides en Haut-Agenais Périgord

Government
  - Mayor (2020–2026): Jean-Marie Gary
- Area^{1}: 31.97 km^{2} (12.34 sq mi)
- Elevation: 191 m (627 ft)
- Highest elevation: 190 m (620 ft)
- Lowest elevation: 67 m (220 ft)
- Population (2023): 626
  - Density: 19.6/km^{2} (50.7/sq mi)
- Time zone: UTC+01:00 (CET)
  - Summer (DST): UTC+02:00 (CEST)
- INSEE/Postal code: 47170 /47290
- ^{1} French Land Register data, which excludes lakes, ponds, glaciers > 1 km^{2} (0.386 sq mi or 247 acres) and river estuaries.

Monbahus is a commune in the Lot-et-Garonne department in south-western France.

== See also ==
- Communes of the Lot-et-Garonne department
