= Grandselve Abbey =

Cistercian abbey in France

Coordinates: 43.856°N 1.138°E

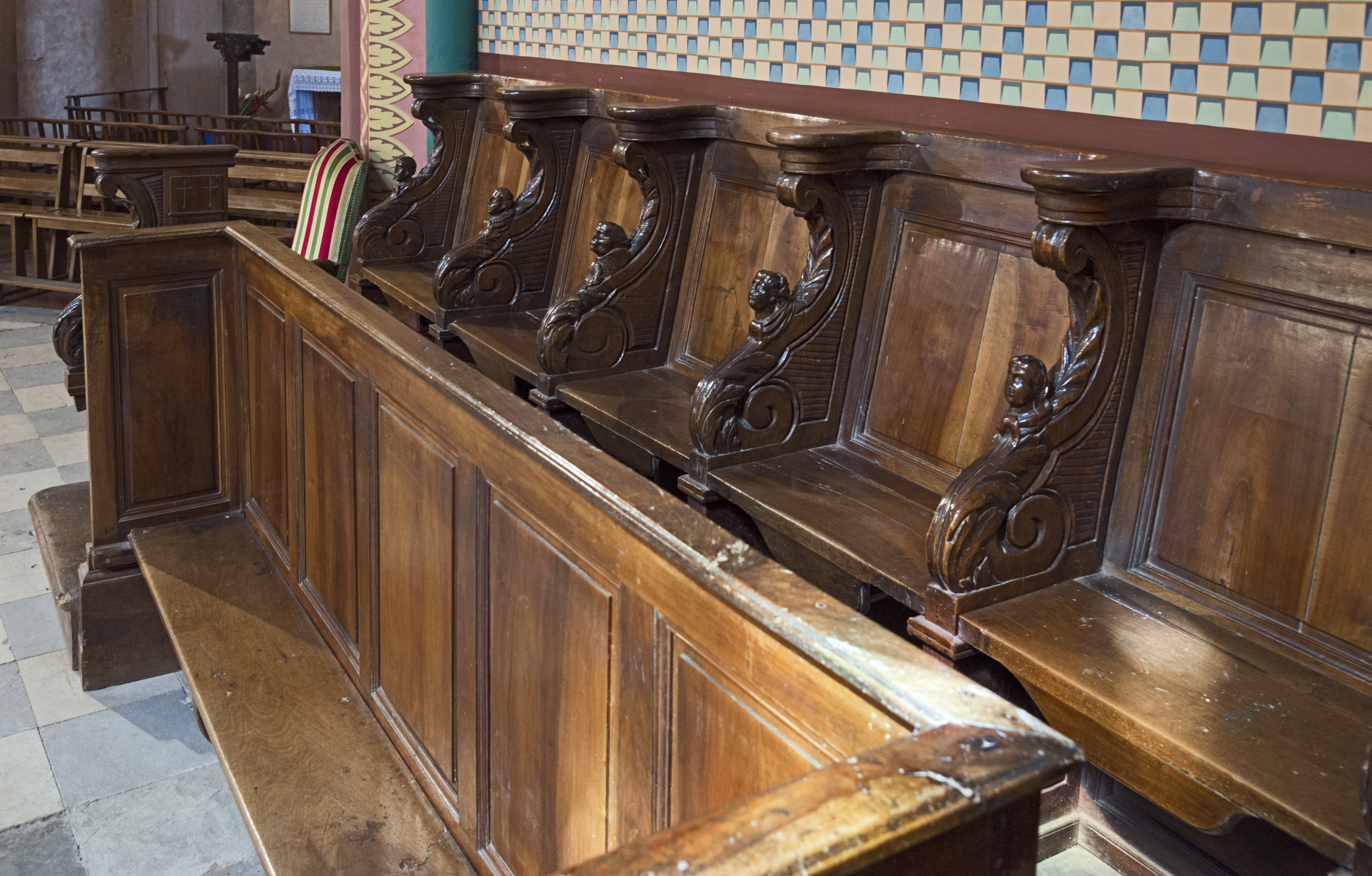
The choir stall

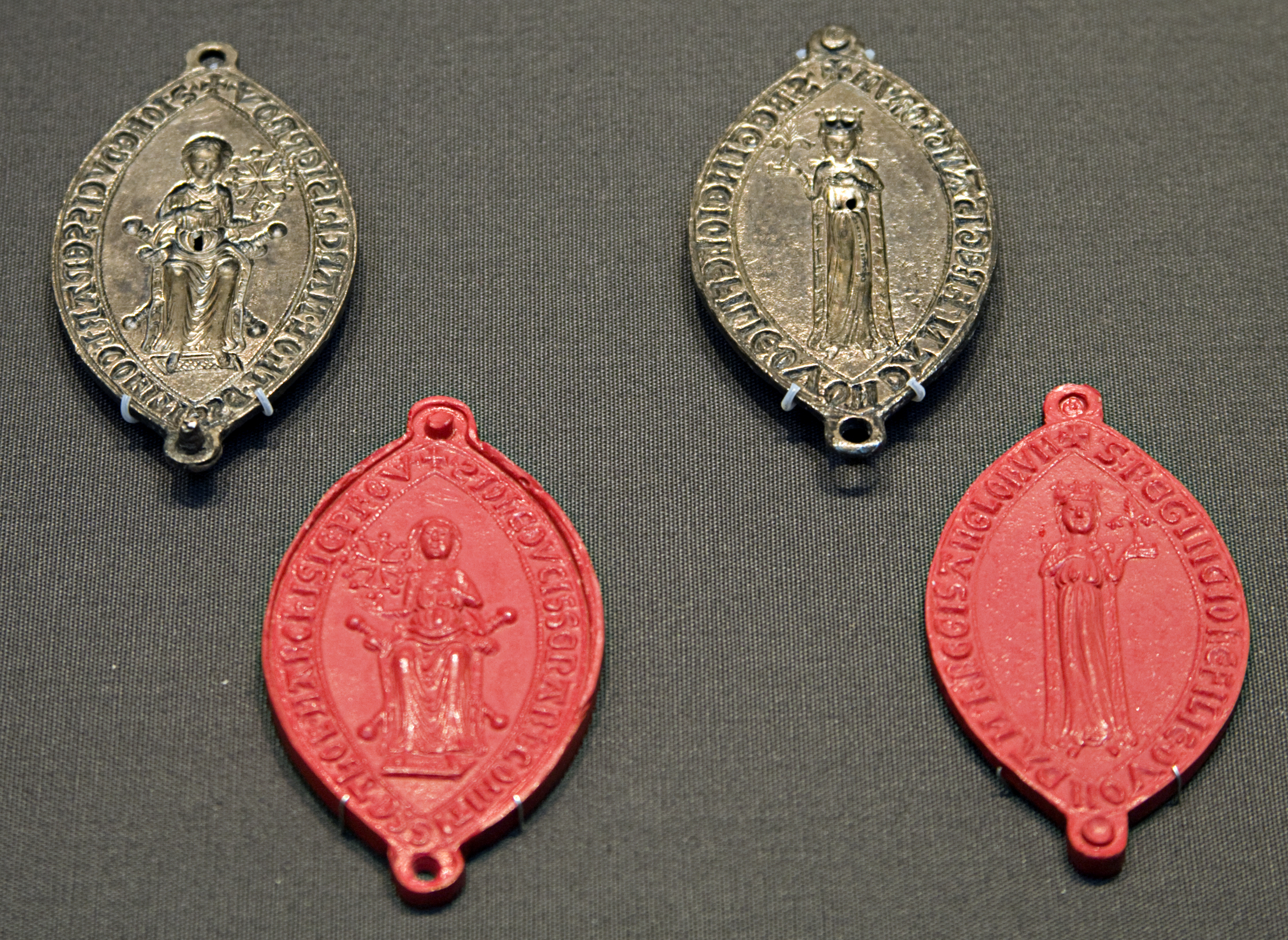
Silver double seal of Joanna Plantagenet dating from 1196 to 1199, found at Grandselve Abbey and now kept in the British Museum

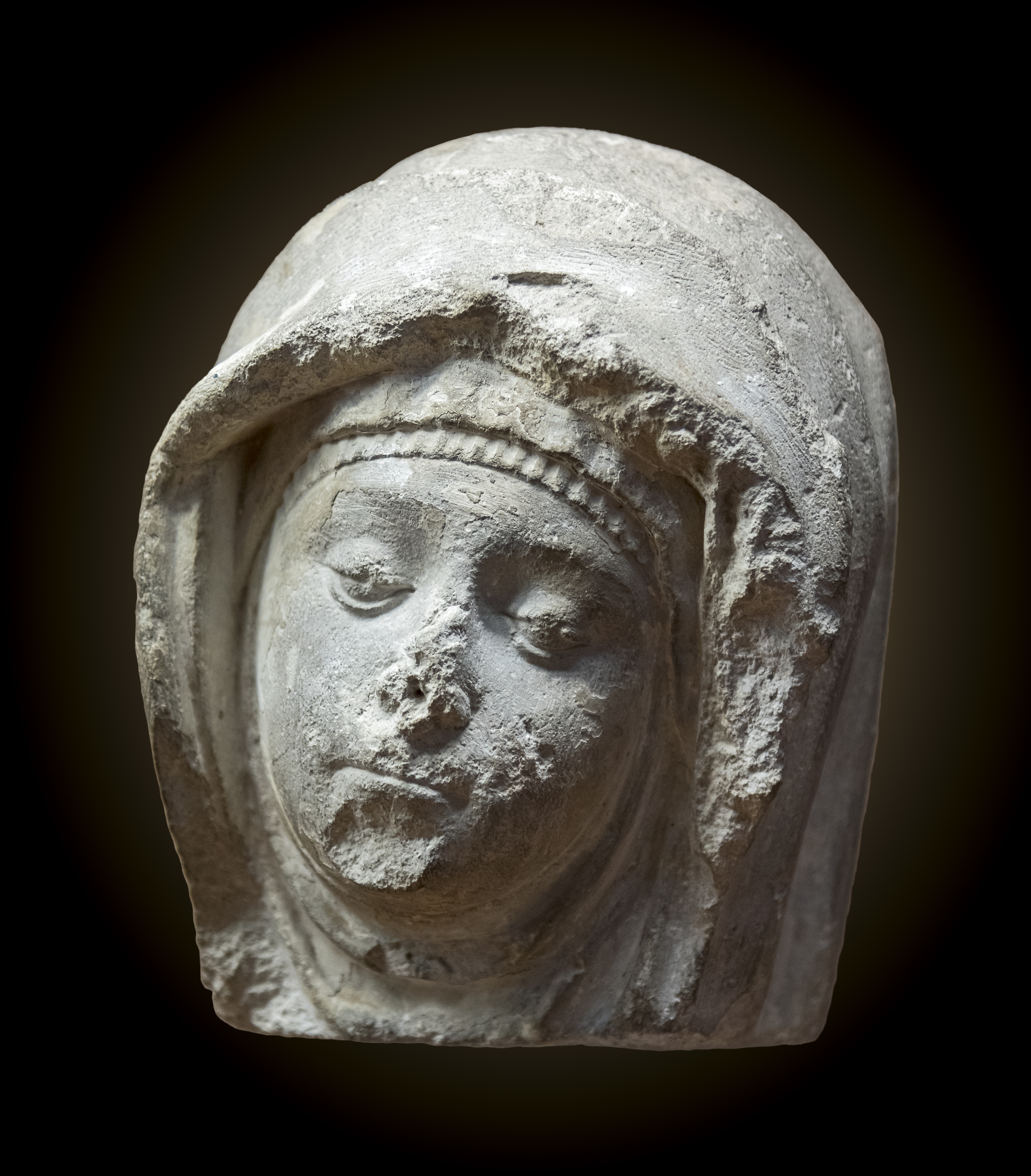
Female head, Grandselve Abbey, Musée des Augustins

Grandselve Abbey (French: Abbaye de Notre-Dame de Grandselve) was a Cistercian monastery in south-west France, at Bouillac, Tarn-et-Garonne. It was one of the most important Cistercian abbeys in the south of France.

== History ==
Grandselve was founded as a hermitage under the Benedictine rule in 1114 by Gerald of Sales, who placed it under the supervision of Cadouin Abbey. In 1117 Bishop Amelius Raymond du Puy of Toulouse recognized it as a monastery. He authorized the monks to build a church, gave them the lands, and required them to follow the rule as practiced at Cîteaux Abbey. Over time, the monks began to detach themselves from their connection to Cadouin, and in 1135 Bishop Amelius, at the request of Pope Innocent II, reminded them of their required obedience. Grandselve joined the Cistercian movement as a daughter house of Clairvaux Abbey in 1145. The church was dedicated in 1253.

The land was cultivated, mills were established on the rivers and vineyards were planted. By the fourteenth century, the abbey owned two wine cellars in Bordeaux. It became one of the most flourishing and famous abbeys of the south. Grandselve founded the College of St. Bernard in Toulouse to teach theology.

William VI and William VII, counts of Montpellier, were buried at Grandselve, where William VII's son, Raimond de Montpellier was a monk. In 1231 Bishop of Toulouse Folquet de Marselha was buried, beside the tomb of William VII of Montpellier, at the abbey of Grandselves, near Toulouse, where his sons, Ildefonsus and Petrus had been abbots.

The abbey properties suffered during the Hundred Years' War such that John II of France temporarily exempted the abbey from taxes. By the late fifteenth century, commendatory abbots further depleted the abbey's resources while neglecting maintenance and repair. By 1790 there were only fourteen religious left.

The abbey was suppressed during the French Revolution. It was sold in 1791 to private owners who sold the walls for construction material.
