= Valmagne Abbey =

Abbey in Hérault, France

Coordinates: 43°29′12.97″N 3°33′44.19″E

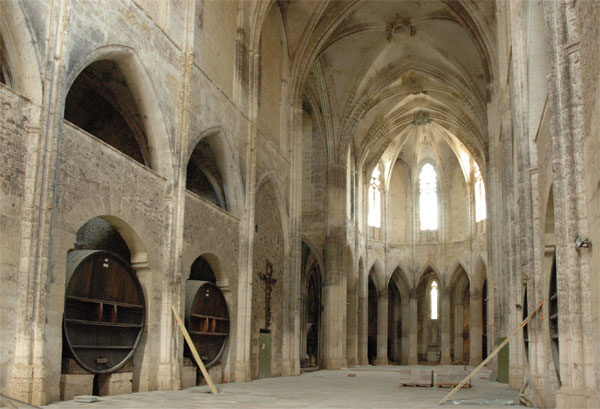
The nave with large wine barrels in the side aisles

Valmagne Abbey (French: Abbaye de Valmagne) is a former Benedictine, later Cistercian, monastery located near Villeveyrac, Hérault, in south-central France. It is a designated historic monument (monument historique).

Valmagne Abbey was founded as a Benedictine abbey in 1138 but only twenty years later was attached to the Cistercian Order by decree of Pope Hadrian IV, where it remained until the French Revolution when monasteries in France were confiscated by the state and either sold or destroyed. Valmagne escaped demolition and was sold intact to a Monsieur Granier-Joyeuse in 1791 who converted the abbey church into a wine cave for the maturing of wine in large barrels, a function it continues to serve today.

== History ==
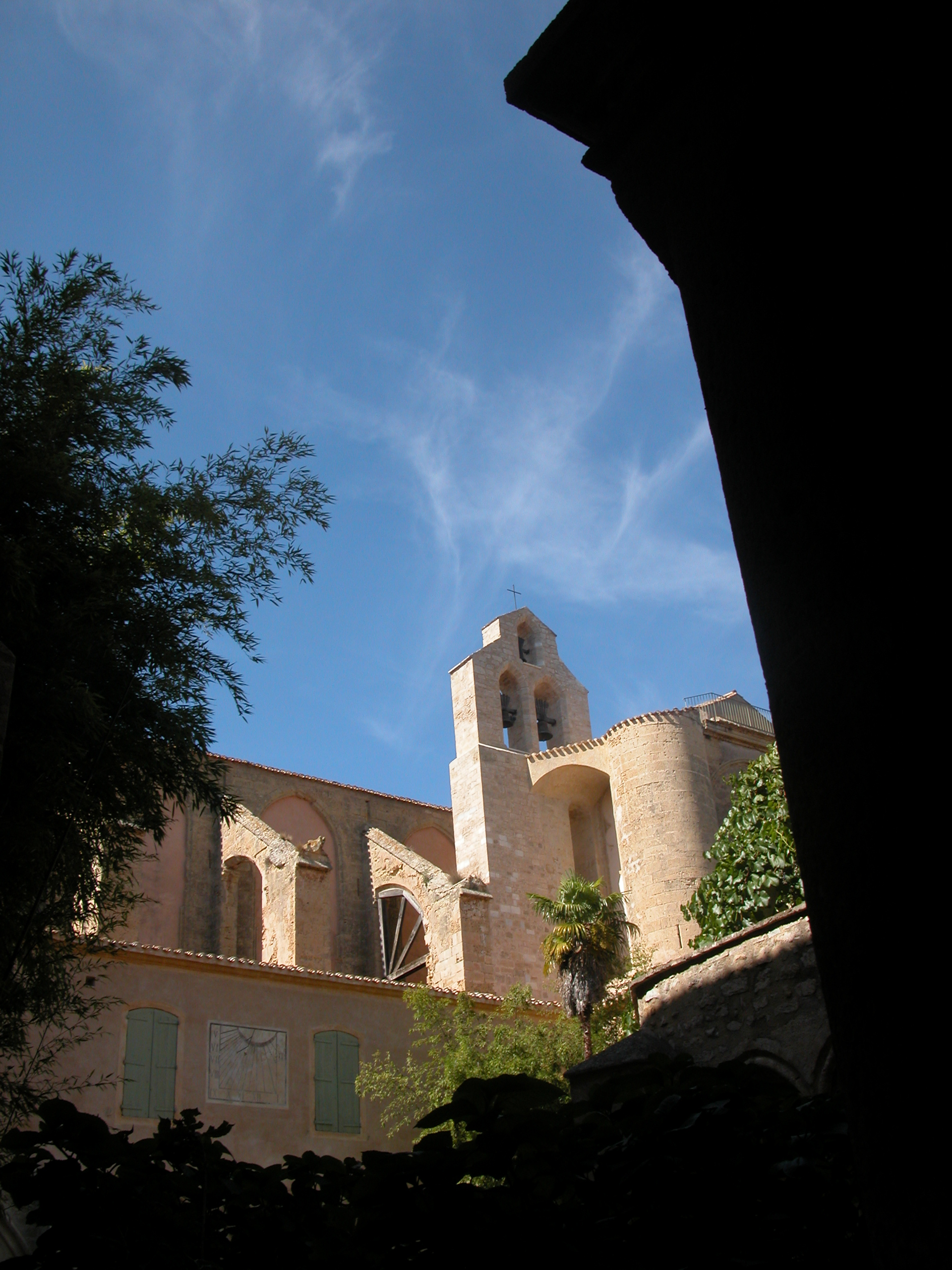
Church viewed from the cloister

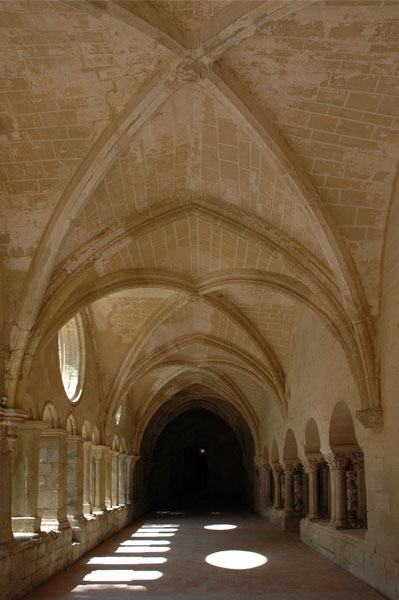
The cloister

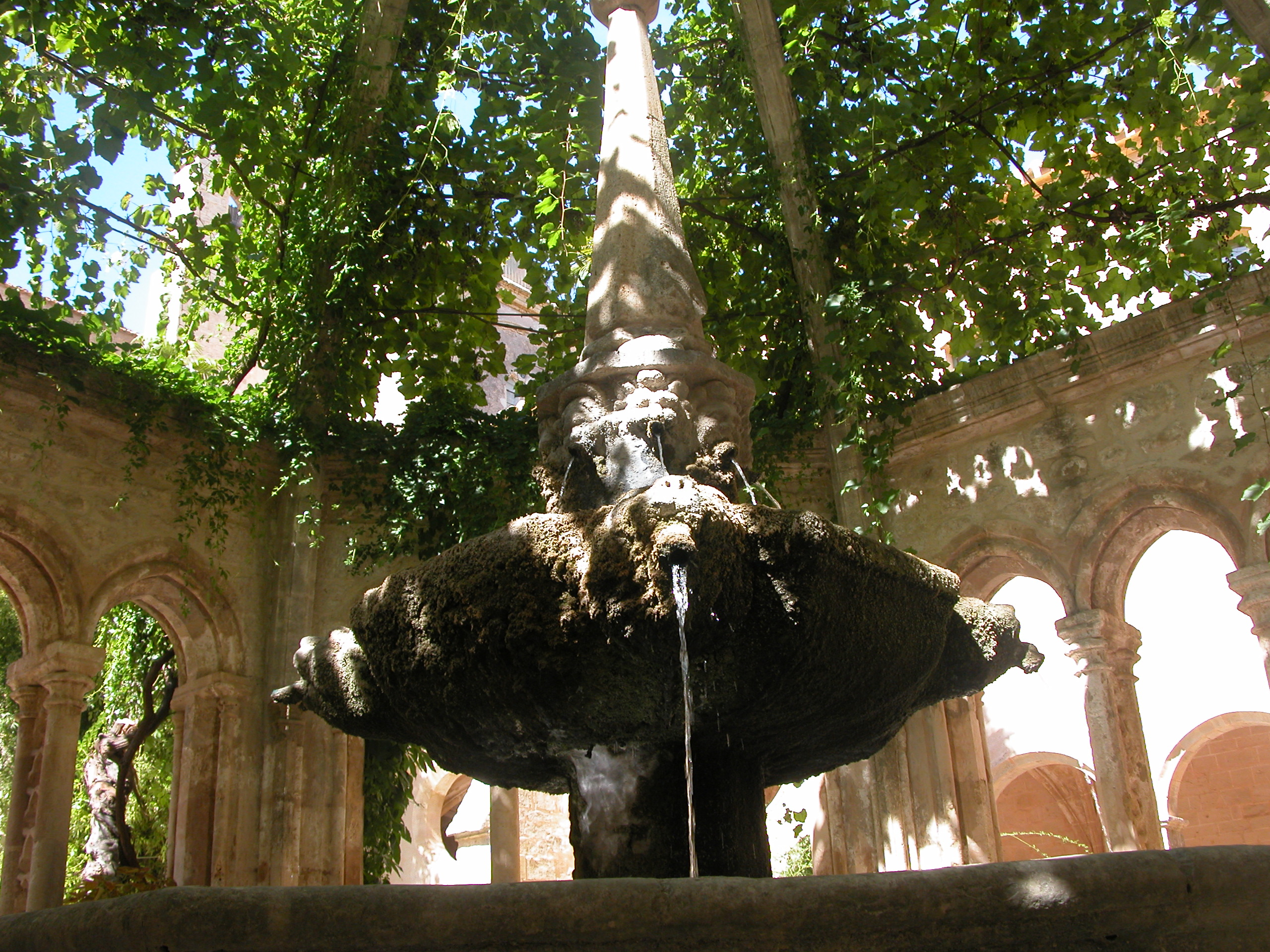
Lavabo

Valmagne Abbey was founded in 1138 by Raymond Trencavel, Vicomte de Béziers, with monks from the Benedictine monastery of Sainte-Marie d'Ardorel near Albi. In 1145 the second abbot, Pierre, requested that the abbey be placed under the authority of the Cistercian movement. Trencavel opposed the request but in 1159 Pope Hadrian IV affirmed the affiliation and the abbey took on the law of Saint Bernard, as a daughter house of Bonnevaux Abbey.

Valmagne then experienced a time of rapid growth as local landowners bestowed both land and money on the monastery. The buildings were extended and a vineyard of 5 hectares (12 acres) was established by the monks. From the twelfth century to the beginning of the fourteenth century, Valmagne was one of the richest monasteries in southern France and at its peak was home to nearly 300 monks. As the monastery expanded the original Romanesque chapel became cramped so in 1257 permission was granted to build a new church. The new church was constructed over the next forty years in the Gothic style and aside from the removal of the stained glass has changed little since completion.

The Black Death devastated the region in 1348, causing many monks to die and others to flee the abbey. The decline was compounded during the Hundred Years' War when Valmagne suffered attacks and looting by passing mercenaries. As successive abbots were unable to balance the books, many of the abbey's lands and possessions were sold. From 1477 the abbots were appointed from outside the community and this led to a relaxation of the laws of religious life and a decline in the loyalty of the abbot for his abbey. During the French Wars of Religion of the sixteenth century, the abbey was almost abandoned and in 1575, an attack by Huguenots broke all the windows of the church and caused considerable damage to other buildings, particularly the cloister.

Preservation work was undertaken in the seventeenth century, and parts of the church were sealed to prevent falls. At the same time the cloister was repaired, but the abbey had fallen into debt and lacked the finance to restore the structures properly, hence many windows in the church were bricked up instead of being re-glazed. By the eighteenth century, the community was very small and during the French Revolution the abbey was sacked again and furniture, paintings and archives were burned. In 1790, the last three monks left Valmagne taking the few remaining valuable items and the abbey was confiscated. It was sold in 1791 to Monsieur Granier-Joyeuse who converted the church into a wine cave, installing large barrels in the apse and side chapels of the church. On Granier-Joyeuse's death in 1838 Valmagne was acquired by Count Henri-Amédée-Mercure de Turenne and has remained in the same family ever since.

== Buildings ==
=== Abbey church ===
The present Gothic church was rebuilt in 1257 on the foundations of a smaller Romanesque chapel to a traditional plan with a nave and transept, and nine radiating chapels off the semi-circular ambulatory. The nave is preceded by a narthex flanked by two defensive towers. The main structure measures 83 metres (272 ft) long, 53 metres (174 ft) wide and 23 metres (75 ft) high.

=== Cloister ===
The groin vaulted cloister of Valmagne surrounds a large garden courtyard, with five large arches on each of the four sides.

The chapter house is on the east side of the cloister and is one of the oldest parts of the abbey. It is unusual in that it has a single-span vaulted roof and therefore does not need the internal columns which are typical of chapter houses in other monasteries.

On the south side of the cloister is an open octagonal structure containing a lavabo fed by a spring. The lavabo is opposite the refectory so that the monks could cleanse their hands before meals.

== Vineyard ==
The vineyard was originally established by the Cistercian monks in the twelfth century and vines have been continually cultivated on the land ever since. Today, the vineyard covers 75 hectares (190 acres) of which 30 hectares (74 acres) are classified appellation contrôlée. There are two distinct terroirs within the domain; the first, of clay and chalk, contains the AOC classified area and produces mainly white wines, whilst the second, to the north, is red sandstone and marl.

== Gallery ==
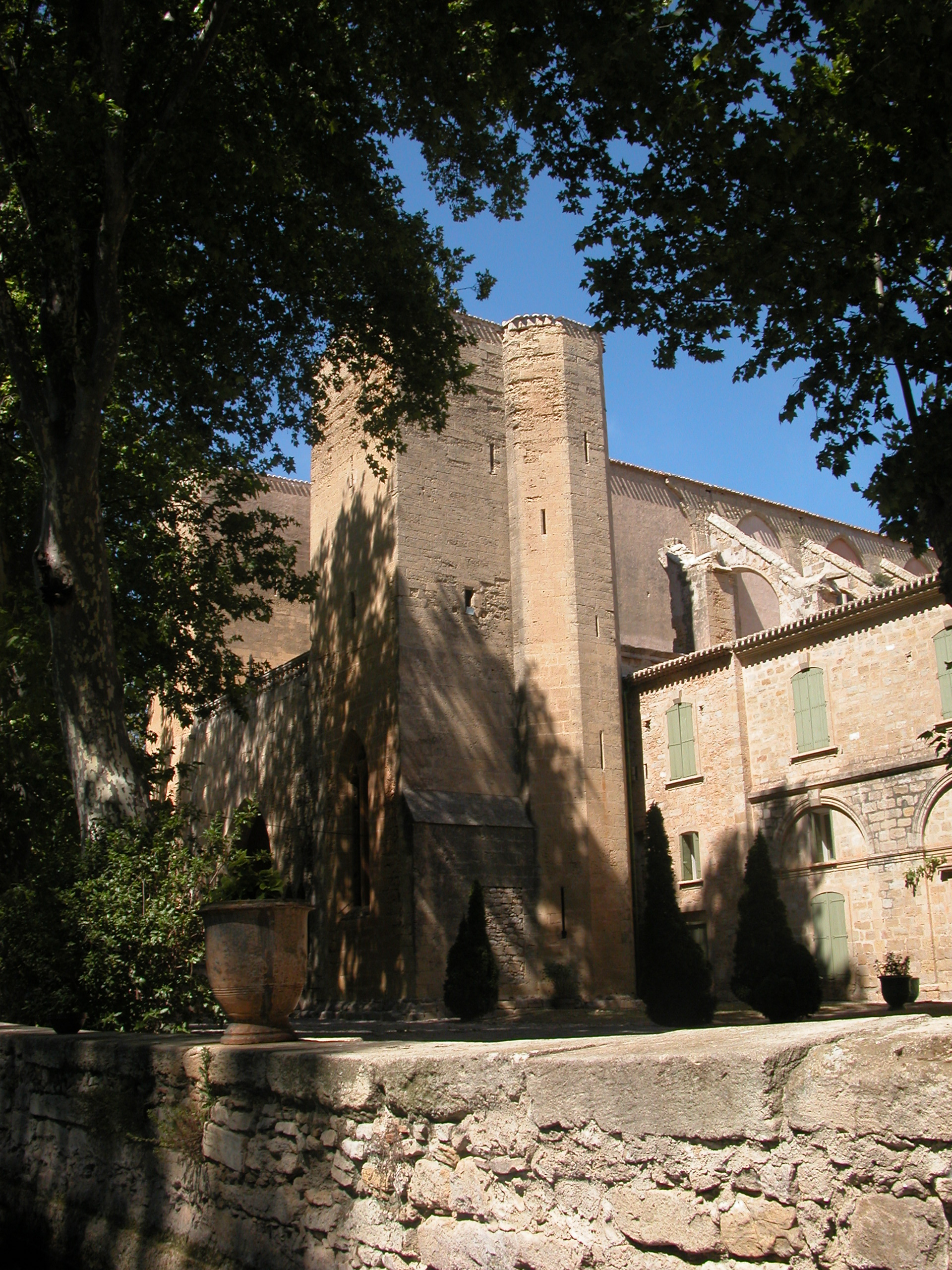
View from the entrance

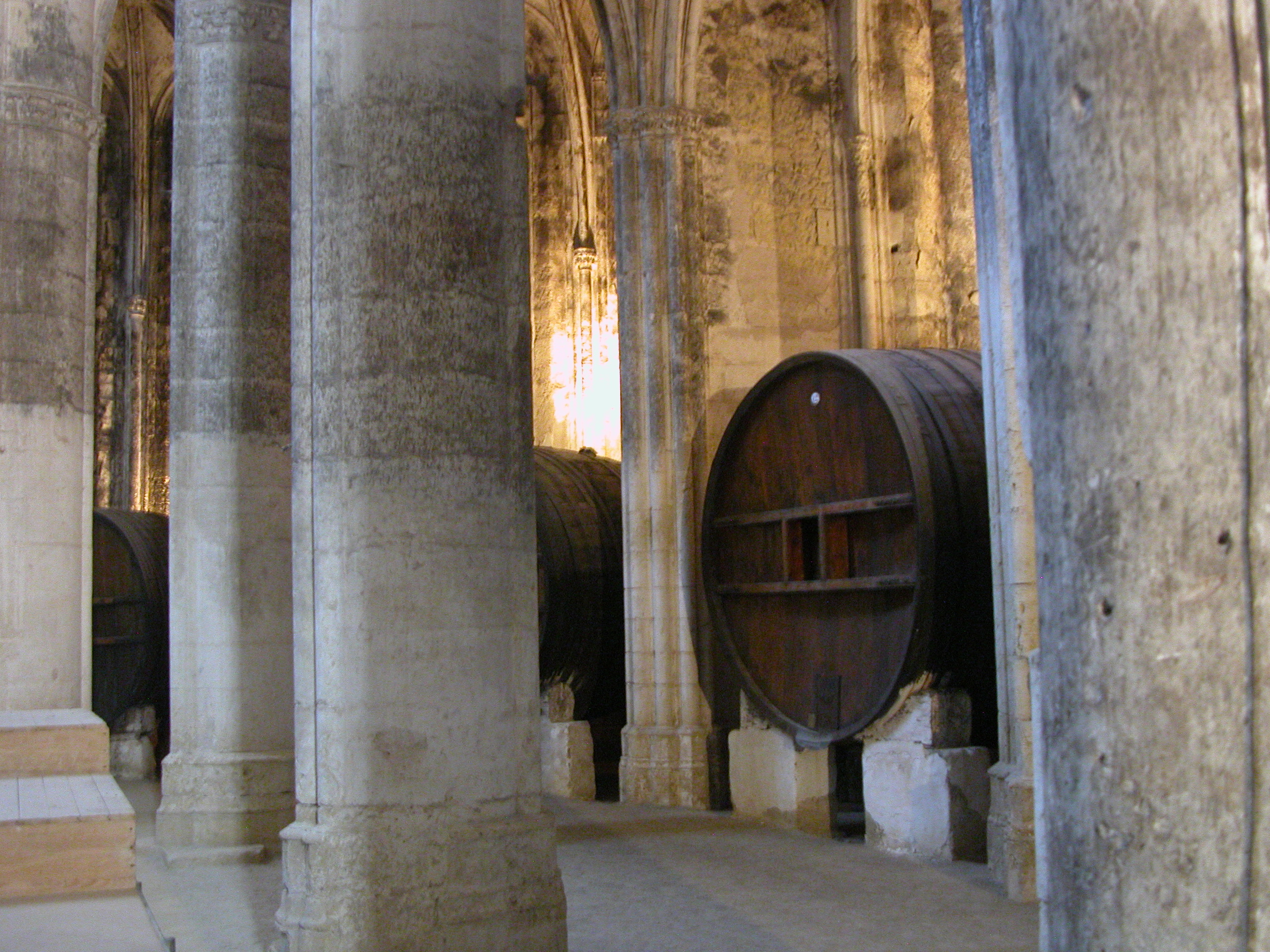
Church (transformed into a wine cellar)

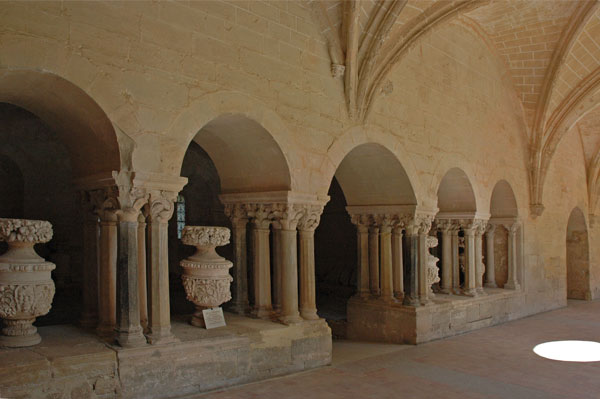
Entrance to the Chapter House

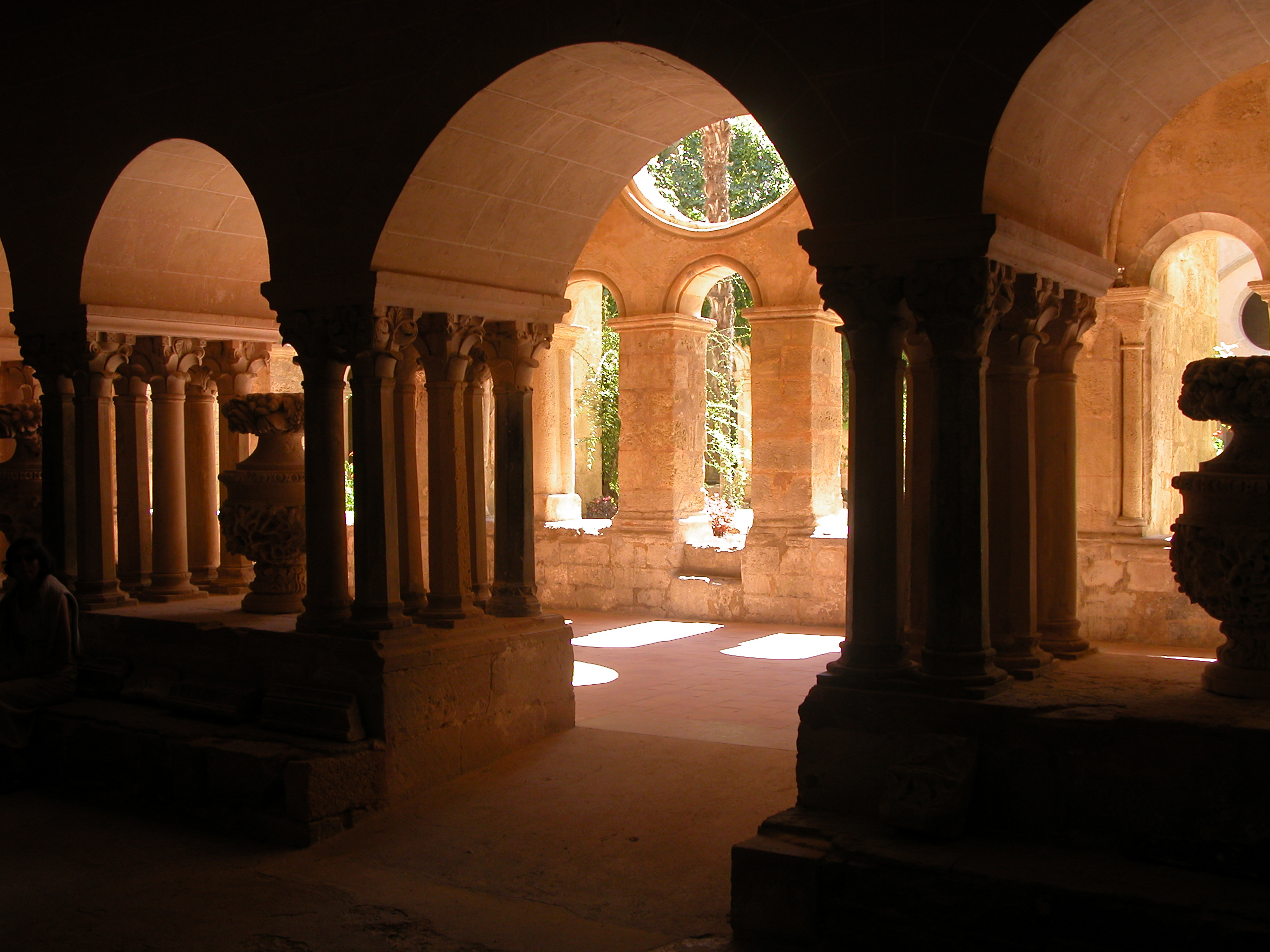
Chapter House

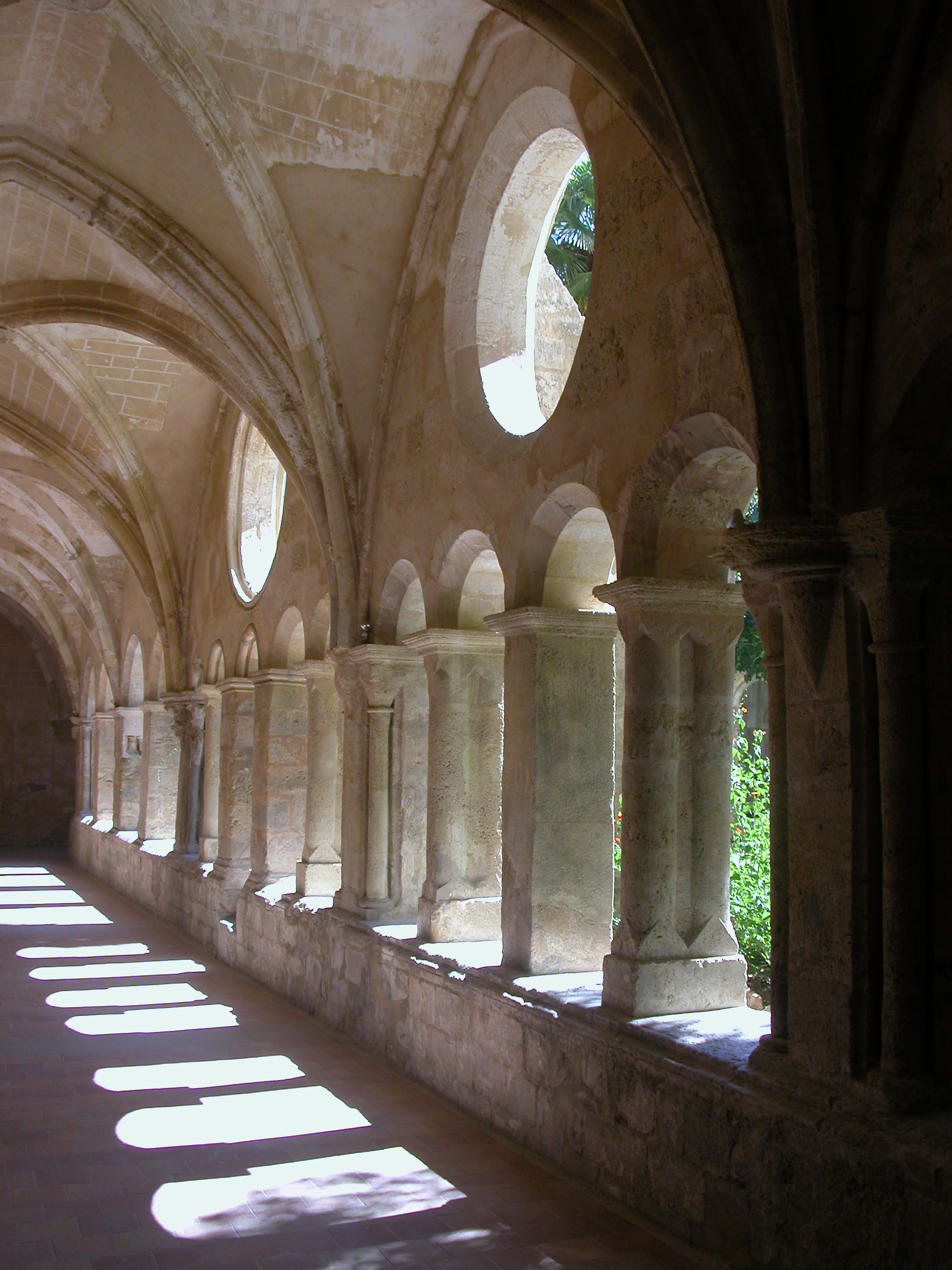
Cloister

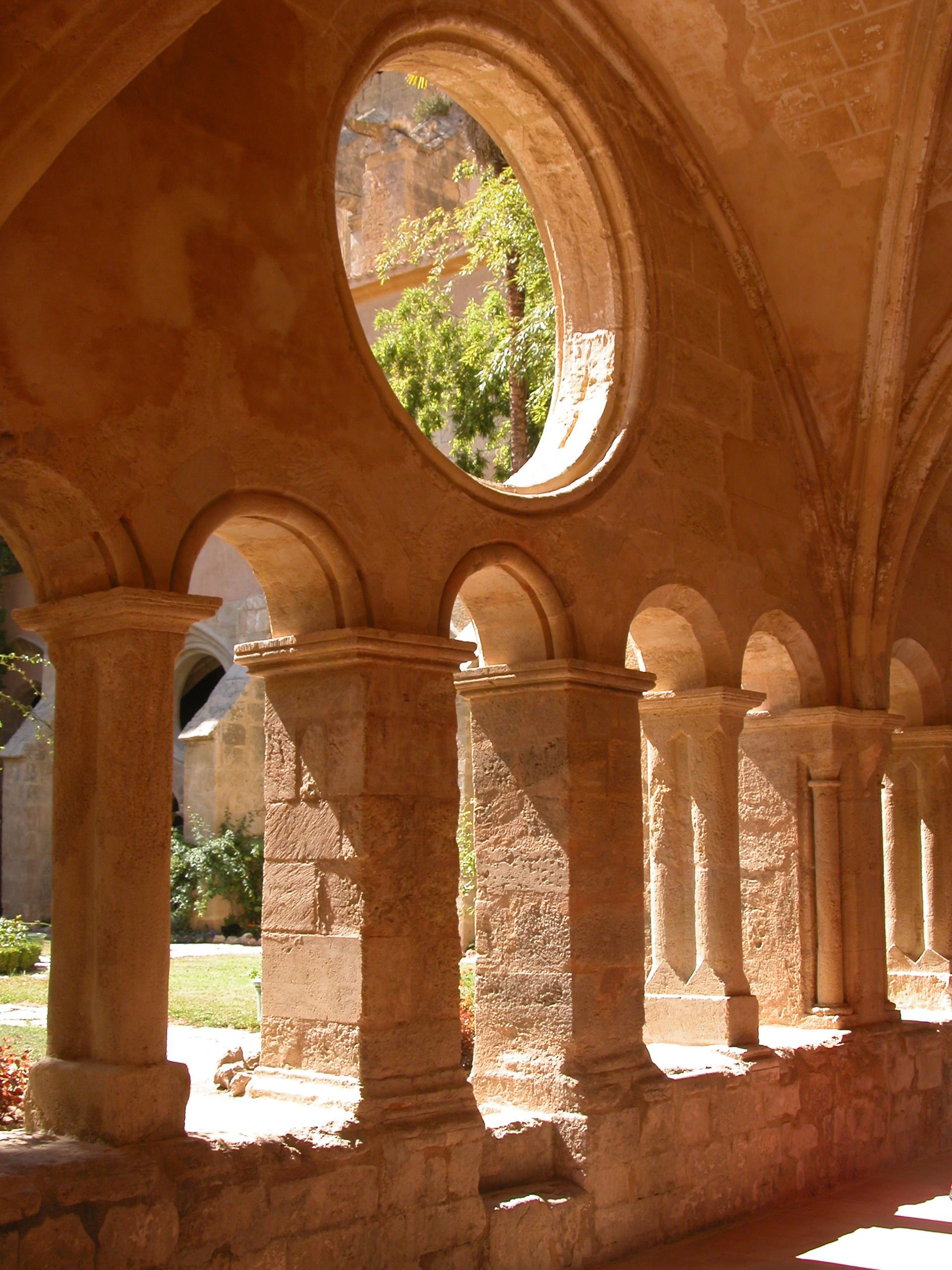
Cloister

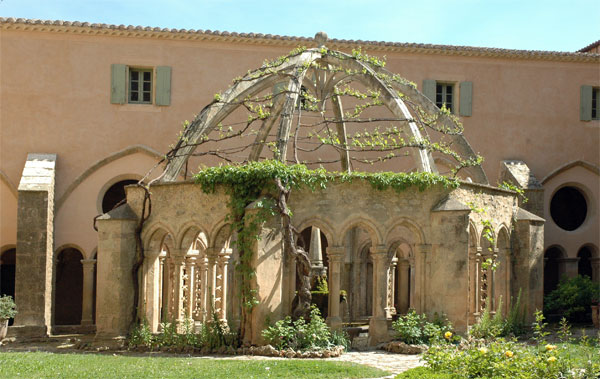
The fountain and lavabo

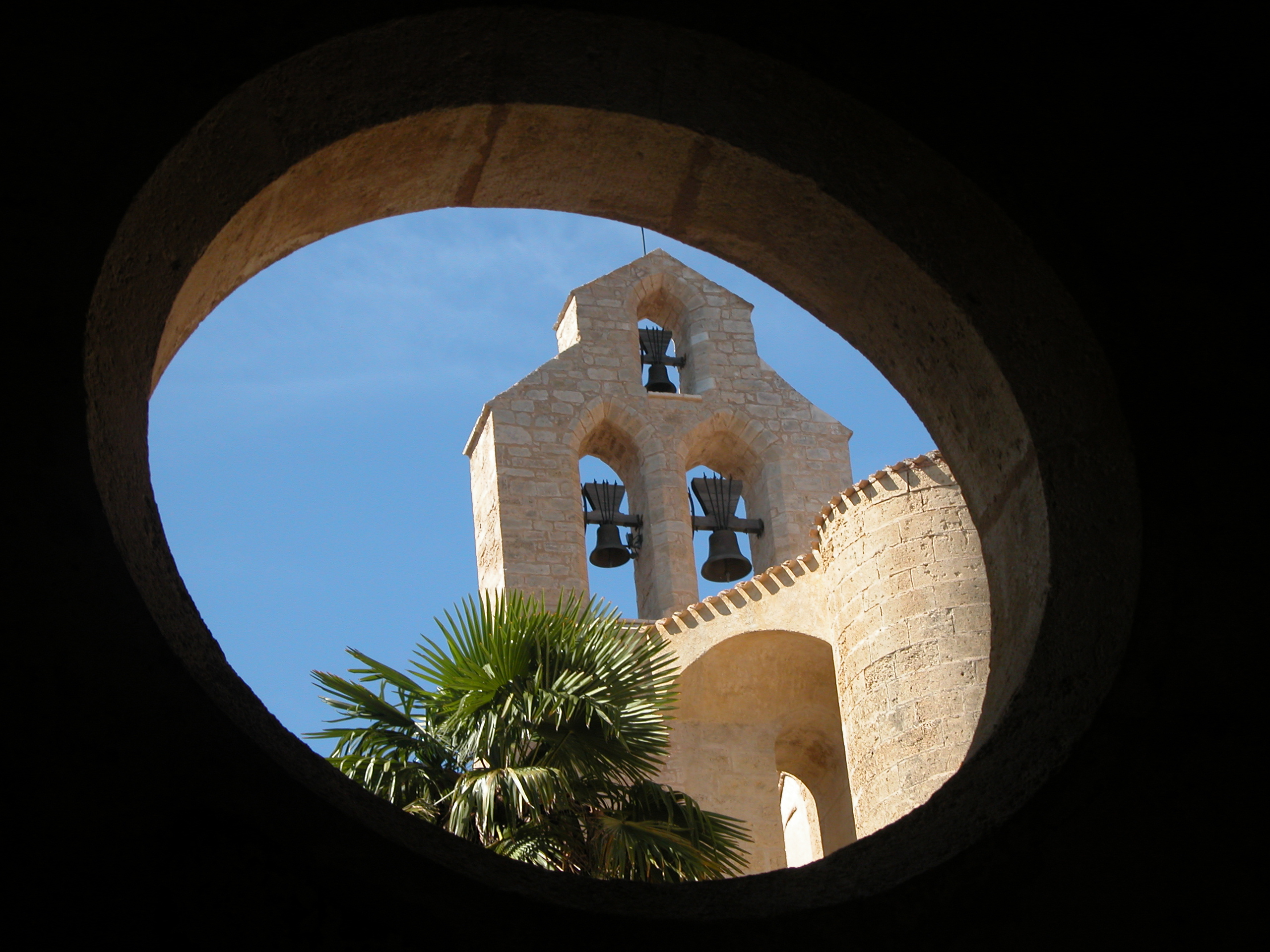
Bell tower
