= Sainte-Trie =

- Commune
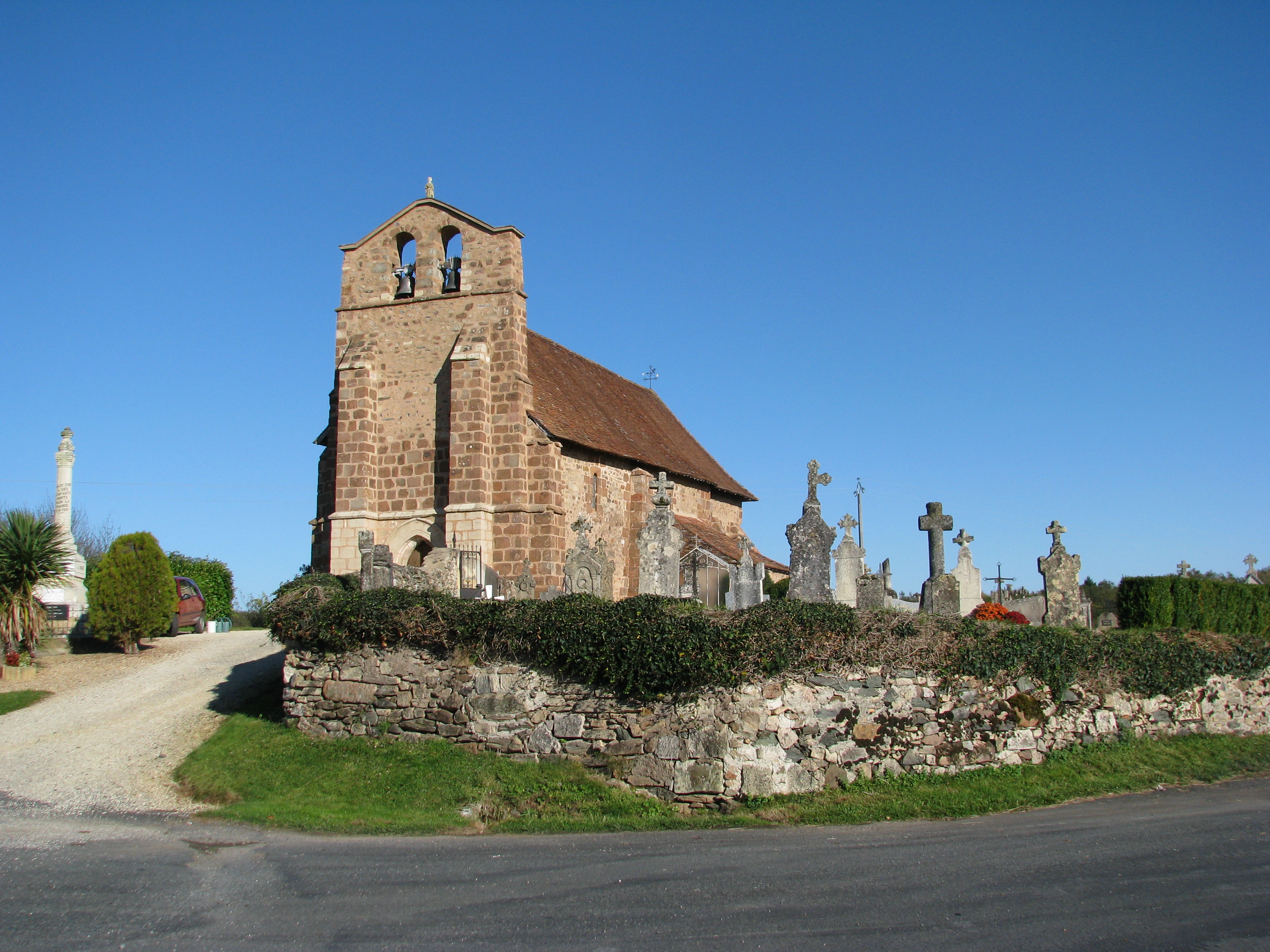
- The church in Sainte-Trie
- Location of Sainte-Trie
- Location within France Location within Nouvelle-Aquitaine
- Coordinates: 45°18′01″N 1°11′52″E
- Country: France
- Region: Nouvelle-Aquitaine
- Department: Dordogne
- Arrondissement: Sarlat-la-Canéda
- Canton: Haut-Périgord Noir

Government
  - Mayor (2021–2026): Claude Turbant
- Area^{1}: 10.91 km^{2} (4.21 sq mi)
- Elevation: 247 m (810 ft)
- Highest elevation: 276 m (906 ft)
- Lowest elevation: 167 m (548 ft)
- Population (2023): 115
  - Density: 10.5/km^{2} (27.3/sq mi)
- Time zone: UTC+01:00 (CET)
  - Summer (DST): UTC+02:00 (CEST)
- INSEE/Postal code: 24507 /24160
- ^{1} French Land Register data, which excludes lakes, ponds, glaciers > 1 km^{2} (0.386 sq mi or 247 acres) and river estuaries.

Sainte-Trie (French pronunciation: [sɛ̃t tʁi]; Occitan: Sent Tria) is a commune in the Dordogne department in Nouvelle-Aquitaine in southwestern France.

== History ==
During the creation of the French departments in 1790, the commune first became part of the Corrèze department. It became part of the Dordogne department in 1793.

== Population ==
Historical population
Year	Pop.	±% p.a.
1968	146	—
1975	134	−1.22%
1982	136	+0.21%
1990	118	−1.76%
1999	148	+2.55%
2007	128	−1.80%
2012	117	−1.78%
2017	110	−1.23%
2023	115	+0.74%
Source: INSEE

== See also ==
- Communes of the Dordogne department
