= Leopold Janauschek =

Austrian Cistercian historian

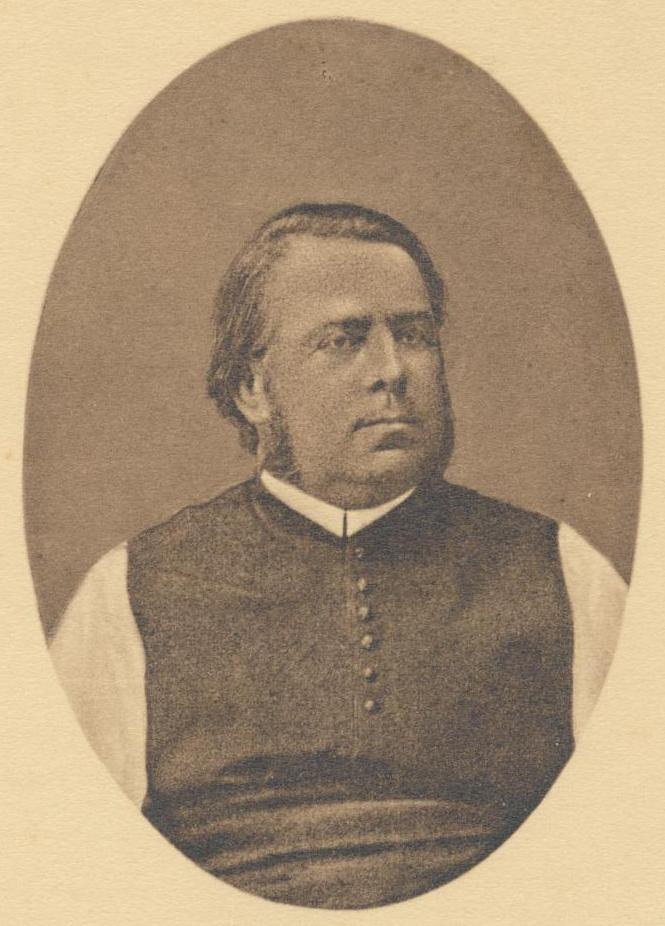
Leopold Janauschek.

Leopold Janauschek (13 October 1827 – 23 July 1898) was an Austrian Cistercian historian.

== Life ==
Janauschek was born at Brünn, Moravia. In 1846 he received the religious habit at the Cistercian Zwettl Abbey, Lower Austria, where he was professed in 1848. His superiors then sent him to their house of studies at Heiligenkreuz Abbey near Vienna, where he studied philosophy and theology. After his ordination to the priesthood in 1851, he was made professor of church history and canon law. His scholarly works attracted attention and won for him in 1858 the chair of ecclesiastical history in the University of Vienna.

In 1859 he was recalled by his superiors to Heiligenkreuz, where he continued as professor until 1877.

Despite weak health, which for many years permitted him to leave his room only at rare intervals, he worked on until his death in Baden, near Vienna.

== Works ==
While in Heliligenkreuz, Janauschek composed his first major work, Originum Cisterciensium Liber Primus (Vienna, 1877), in which he describes the foundation of the Cistercian Order, its organization and extension, and mentions many of those who, under various titles, had honoured it. He gives a lengthy account of 742 ancient abbeys of monks, founded between the end of the 11th and the end of the 17th centuries. The genealogical and chronological tables, as well as the work itself, required a colossal labour of research and compilation. He was unable to publish the second volume, which was to have been devoted to Cistercian nunneries, and for which he had collected a great deal of material. He also published, at this period, a work of lesser importance on the history of the Cistercian Order.

His second major work is Bibliographia Bernardina. In 1891, on the occasion of the eighth centenary of the birth of Saint Bernard of Clairvaux, the Cistercian Congregation of Austria prepared four volumes, under the title of Xenia Bernardina. Janauschek gave assistance in the preparation of the first three volumes, but the fourth, Bibliographia Bernardina (Vienna, 1891), was entirely his own work. He there discusses successively the different editions of the works of Saint Bernard and their translations, the essays on the life of the saint, various panegyrics, his biographers, the inscriptions in his honour, the opinions of ecclesiastical historians, etc. The books noticed in Xenia Bernardina amount to 2,761 printed works and 119 manuscripts.

== Sources and external links ==
- Janauschek, Leopold (1877). Originum Cisterciensium, Volume 1. Vindobona: Alfred Hoelder.
