= La Cour-Dieu Abbey =

Cistercian monastery in Loiret, France

Coordinates: 48°00′21″N 2°11′50″E

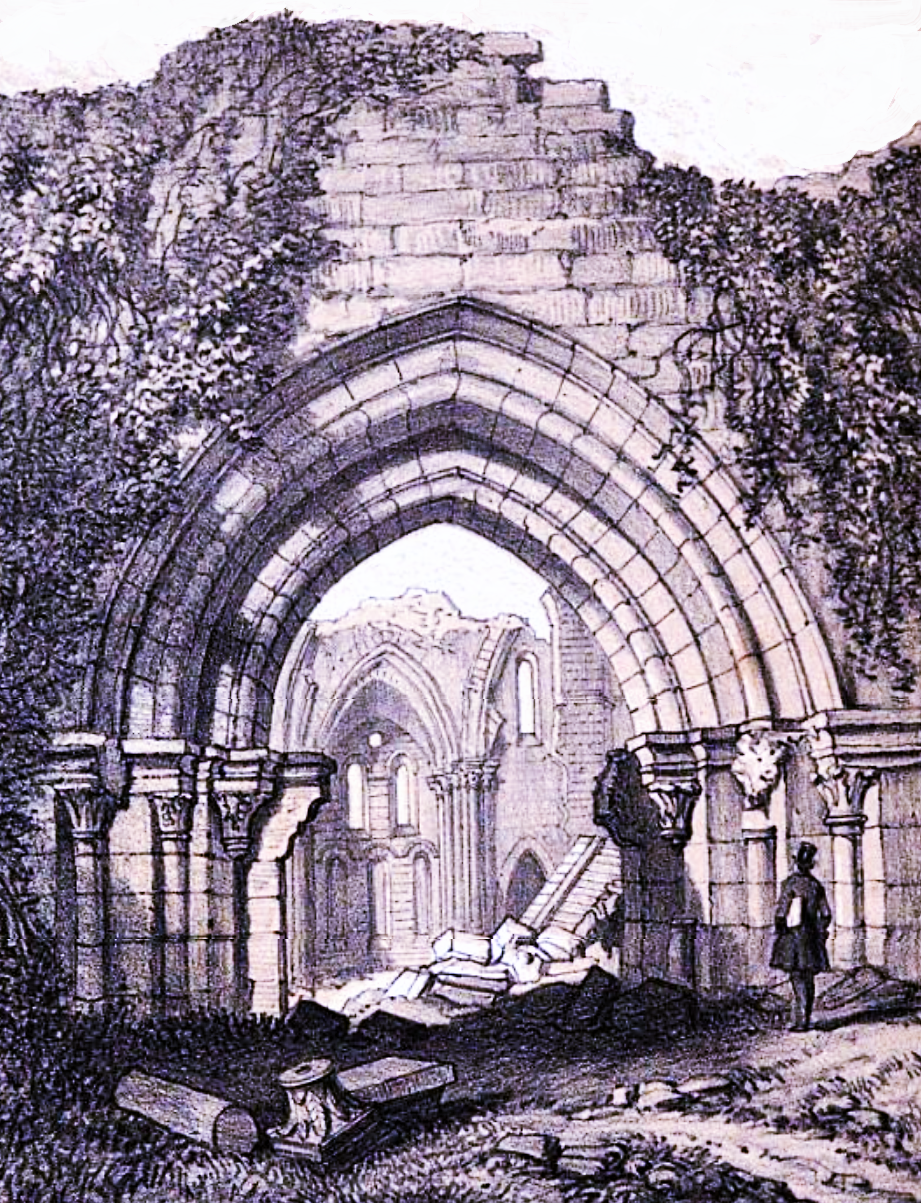
Cour-Dieu Abbey, Ingrannes, Loiret (Engraving from 1827 retouched)

La Cour-Dieu Abbey (French: Abbaye de La Cour-Dieu; Latin: Curia Dei) is a former Cistercian monastery in the commune of Ingrannes in Loiret, France, situated about 19 km south of Pithiviers.

== History ==
La Cour-Dieu, the sixth daughter house of Cîteaux, was founded in 1119. It developed rapidly and was very soon able to undertake the foundation of its own daughter houses: Lorroy (1125), Le Val (1136), Olivet (1145), Iranzu in Navarre (1178) and Cercanceaux (1181). It possessed many granges, including that at Chérupeau in Tigny. Construction of the church began in 1170 and was completed in 1216.

The abbey was partially destroyed in 1399. In 1562 and 1567 it was besieged by Protestants during the Wars of Religion.

During the French Revolution in 1791 it was dissolved and abandoned.

== Buildings ==
The Gothic church fell into ruin after the Revolution. A portion survives of the very simple west front, flanked by a 15th-century five-sided tower containing a spiral staircase, and the northern transept. The former abbot's residence, built in 1720, is now a private house. Of the conventual buildings, also now used for residential purposes, there survive the chapter house and the kitchen, with a central hearth of the 13th century. Nothing remains of the cloister. The choir stalls are now in the church of Jargeau.

== Sources / External links ==
- Certosa di Firenze: La Cour-Dieu Abbey (very short entry)
- Short article on the abbey, with an historical photo (in French)
