= Rubens' Europe =

2013 temporary exhibition at the Louvre-Lens

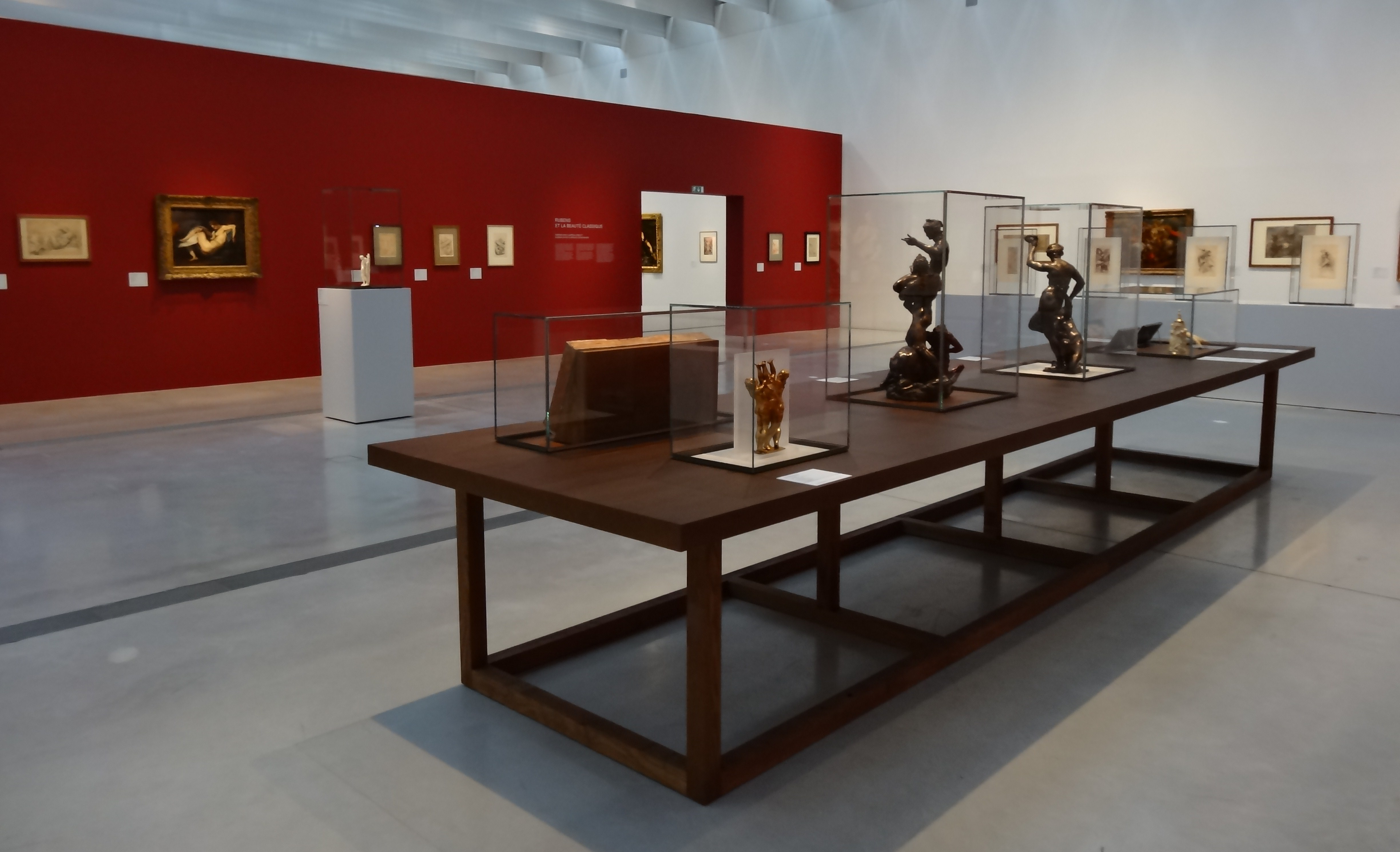
- Part of room n° 5, called "Rubens, emulation and competition".
- Date: May 22 – September 23, 2013
- Venue: Louvre-Lens
- Location: Lens, France
- Type: Exhibition of works of art
- Organised by: Blaise Ducos
- Participants: 127956

Rubens' Europe was a temporary exhibition at the Louvre-Lens which took place in the temporary exhibitions gallery from May 22 to September 23, 2013, following the inaugural Renaissance exhibition. The exhibition brought together 170 works by Pierre Paul Rubens and his contemporaries, the majority of which were on loan from other museums.

Preparing the exhibition took just under two years of work. Many of the works involved come from major international museums. It was open to the public for four months, with 127,956 visitors attended, a little over 20,000 less than the inaugural exhibition, which was open for three weeks less. The statistics in terms of visitors were described as a "success" and "a satisfactory result", although the word of journalists and specialists were mixed, even sometimes negative, though often celebrating the quality of the works. The entrance fee was nine euros, the reduced price was eight. Rubens' Europe was replaced by The Etruscans and the Mediterranean from December 5, 2013.

The Caisse d'Épargne Nord France Europe was a "major sponsor" of the exhibition. The Exhibition was curated by Blaise Ducos.

== Opening ==
The opening took place on Tuesday, May 21, 2013, in the afternoon, three hundred guests attending, including Daniel Percheron and Jean-Pierre Kucheida. As well as politicians, patrons or representatives of partner museums and lenders were present.

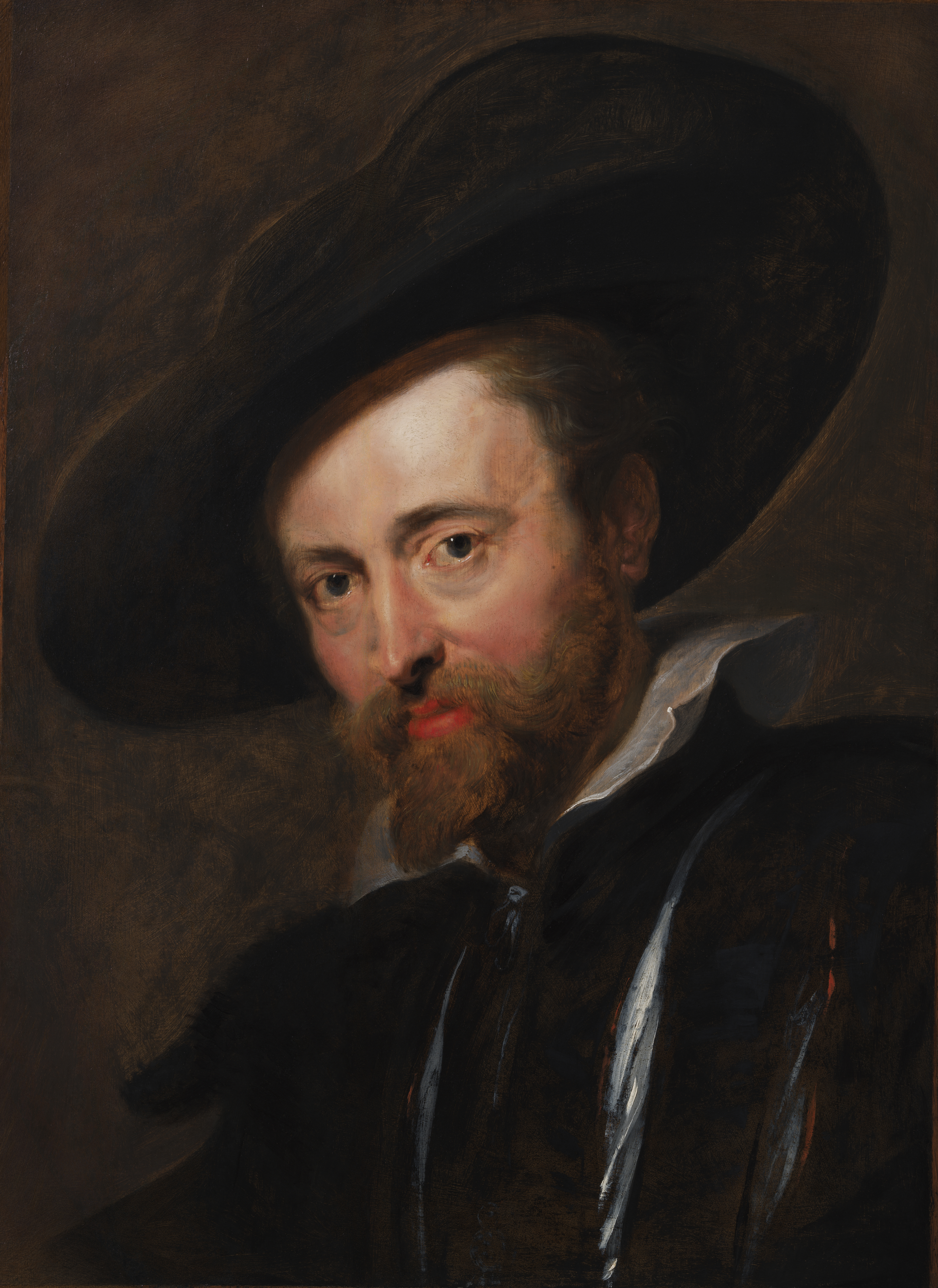
Self-portrait, by Pierre Paul Rubens, from the Rubenshuis, exhibit No. 86 of the exhibition.

Unlike the Renaissance exhibition, whose vast majority of works came from the Louvre, most of the works for Rubens' Europe came from other museums, including those of eight countries:

- National Library of France, Paris, France (Note: L'Europe de Rubens, p. 324)
- Fondation Custodia, Paris, France (Note: L'Europe de Rubens, p. 318)
- Museum of Decorative Arts, Paris, France (Note: L'Europe de Rubens, p. 312)
- National Institute of Art History, Paris, France (Note: L'Europe de Rubens, p. 326)
- Bonnat-Helleu Museum, Bayonne, France (Note: L'Europe de Rubens, p. 320)
- Palais des beaux-arts, Lille, France (Note: L'Europe de Rubens, p. 306)
- Chartreuse Museum, Douai, France
- Museum of the History of France, Versailles, France (Note: L'Europe de Rubens, p. 329)
- Museum of Fine Arts, Marseille, France (Note: L'Europe de Rubens, p. 330)
- Wallraf-Richartz Museum, Cologne, Germany (Note: L'Europe de Rubens, p. 321)
- Maximilianmuseum, Augsburg, Germany (Note: L'Europe de Rubens, p. 314)
- Bayerisches Nationalmuseum, Munich, Germany
- Alte Pinakothek, Munich, Germany (Note: L'Europe de Rubens, p. 331)
- Skulpturensammlung und Museum für Byzantinische Kunst, State Museums, Berlin, Germany
- Gemäldegalerie, Berlin, Germany
- Academy of Fine Arts, Vienna, Austria
- Royal Museums of Art and History, Brussels, Belgium
- Royal Museums of Fine Arts of Belgium, Bruxelles, Belgium (Note: L'Europe de Rubens, p. 304)
- Rubenshuis, Antwerp, Belgium (Note: L'Europe de Rubens, p. 311)
- Royal Museum of Fine Arts, Antwerp, Belgium (Note: L'Europe de Rubens, p. 307)
- Plantin-Moretus Museum, Antwerp, Belgium (Note: L'Europe de Rubens, p. 328)
- Museum of Fine Arts, Ghent, Belgium
- Musée du Prado, Madrid, Spain
- Musée Thyssen-Bornemisza, Madrid, Spain
- Palacio de Liria, Madrid, Spain (Note: L'Europe de Rubens, p. 295)
- Patrimonio Nacional, Madrid, Spain (Note: L'Europe de Rubens, p. 296)
- es:Museo Nacional de Artes Decorativas, Madrid, Spain (Note: L'Europe de Rubens, p. 297)
- Metropolitan Museum of Art, New York, America
- Philadelphia Museum of Art, Philadelphia, America
- National Gallery of Art, Washington, America
- Musée des beaux-arts de Houston, Houston, America (Note: L'Europe de Rubens, p. 317)
- Musée des beaux-arts, Boston, America
- J. Paul Getty Museum, Los Angeles, America
- Centre d'art britannique de Yale, New Haven, America (Note: L'Europe de Rubens, p. 303)
- Musée national du Bargello, Florence, Italy
- Palais Pitti, Florence, Italy (Note: L'Europe de Rubens, p. 298)
- Musées du Capitole, Rome, Italy
- Galerie Borghèse, Rome, Italy
- Musée Teyler, Haarlem, the Netherlands (Note: L'Europe de Rubens, p. 316)
- Musée Boijmans Van Beuningen, Rotterdam, the Netherlands
- Victoria and Albert Museum, London, The UK-Uni (Note: L'Europe de Rubens, p. 325)
- British Museum, London, The UK-Uni
- National Gallery, London, The UK-Uni
- Royal Collection, London, The UK-Uni
- Ashmolean Museum, Oxford, The UK-Uni

In total, there are fifty-three lenders, mostly museums, and some collectors. The works were in seven rooms: L'Europe des cours (rooms 1 and 2), Religious emotion and baroque faith (room No.3), Ephemeral monumentality (room No.4), Rubens, emulation and competition (room No .5), Rubens and the Republic of Letters (room No.6), and The Ways of Genius (room No.7).

Organization of the exhibit

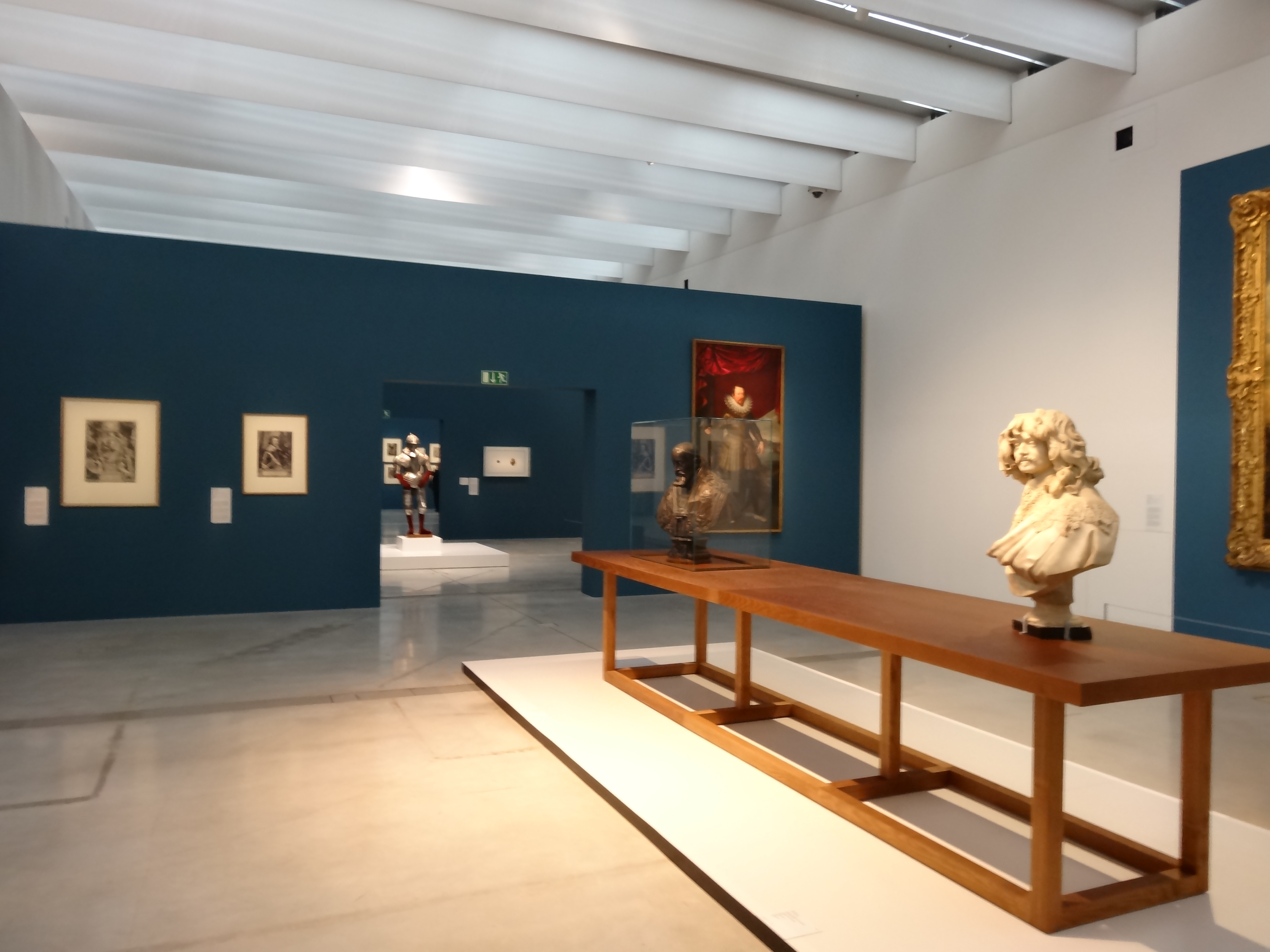
1^{re} salle : L'Europe des cours.

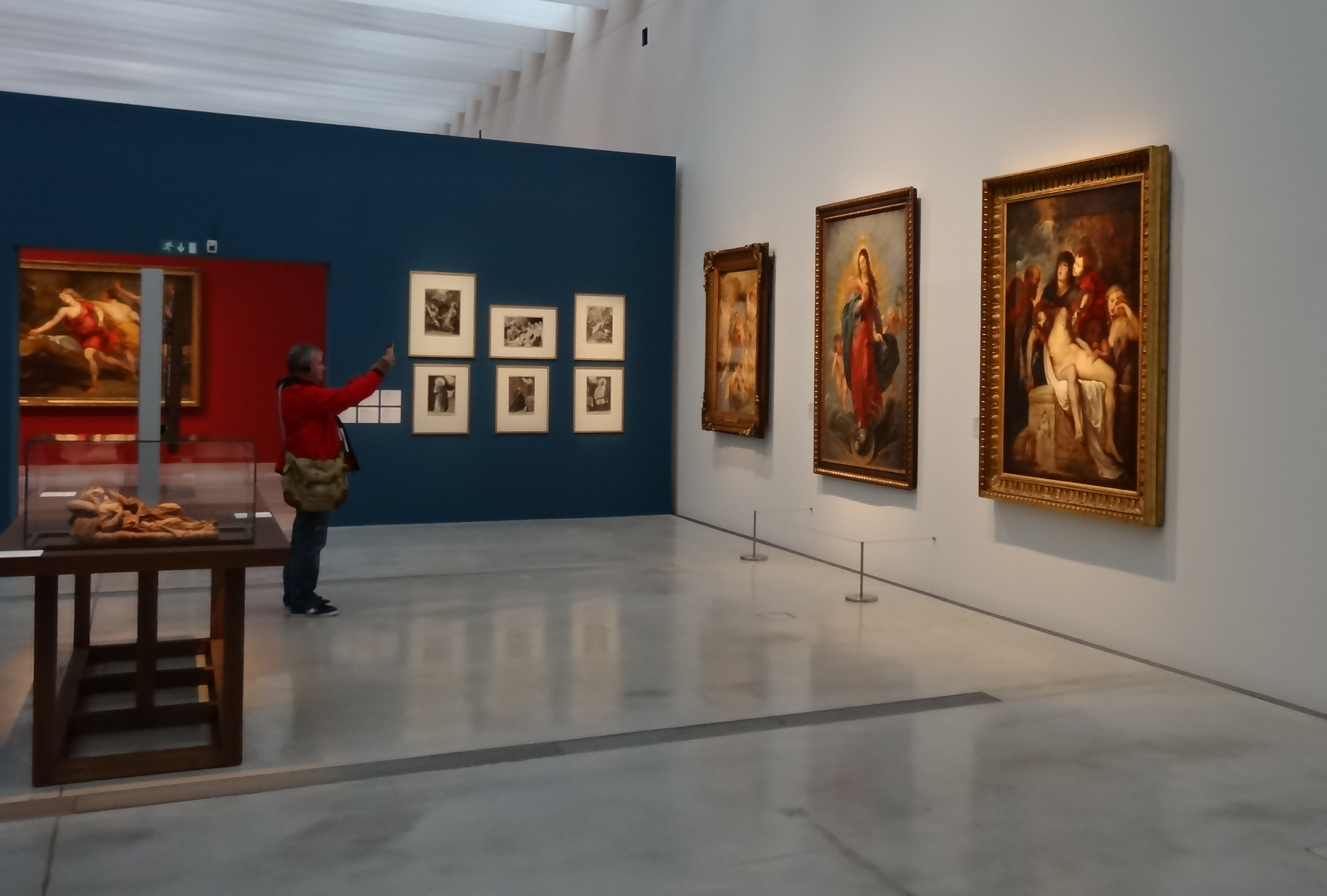
2^{e} salle : L'Europe des cours.

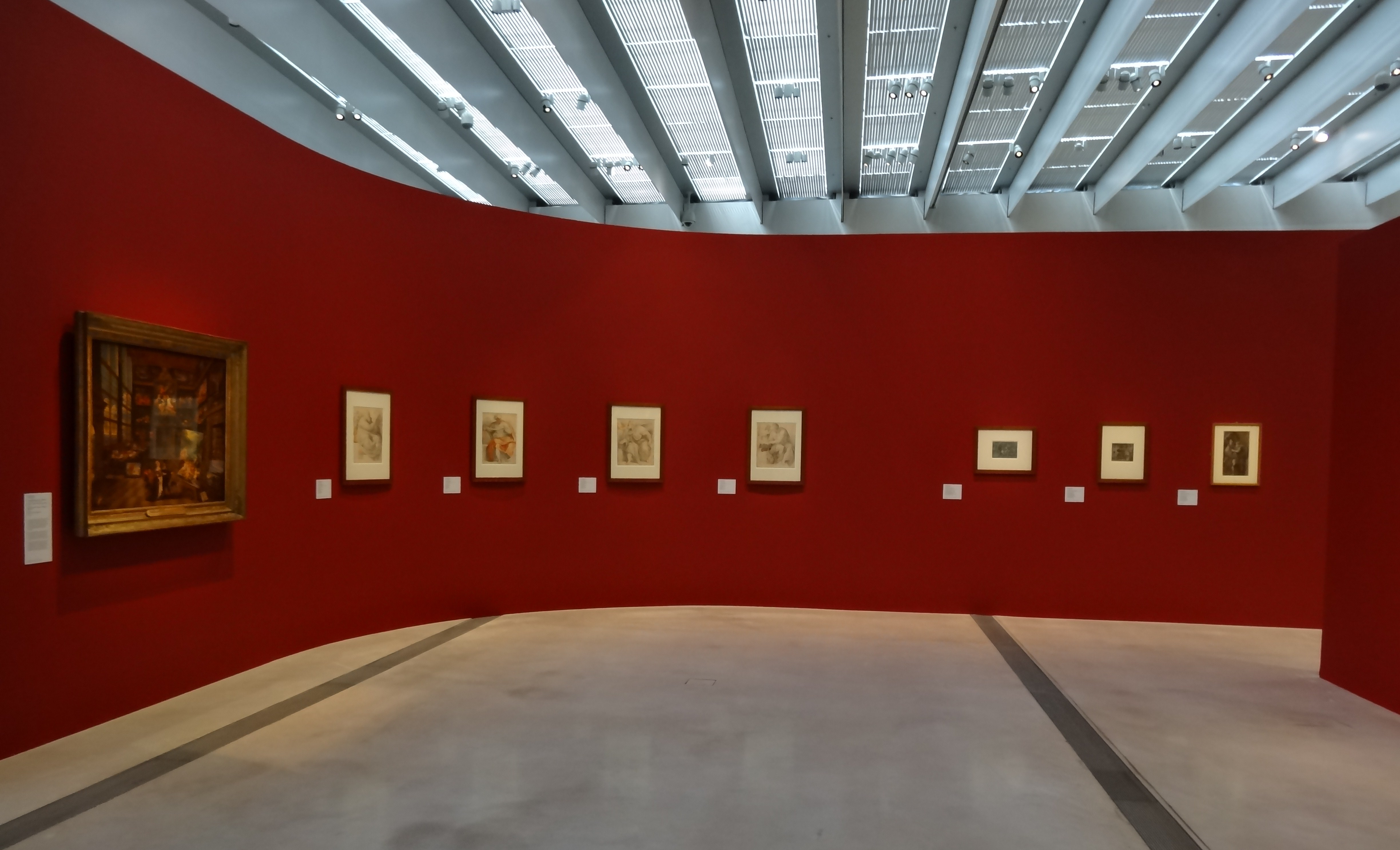
3^{e} salle : Émotion religieuse et foi baroque.

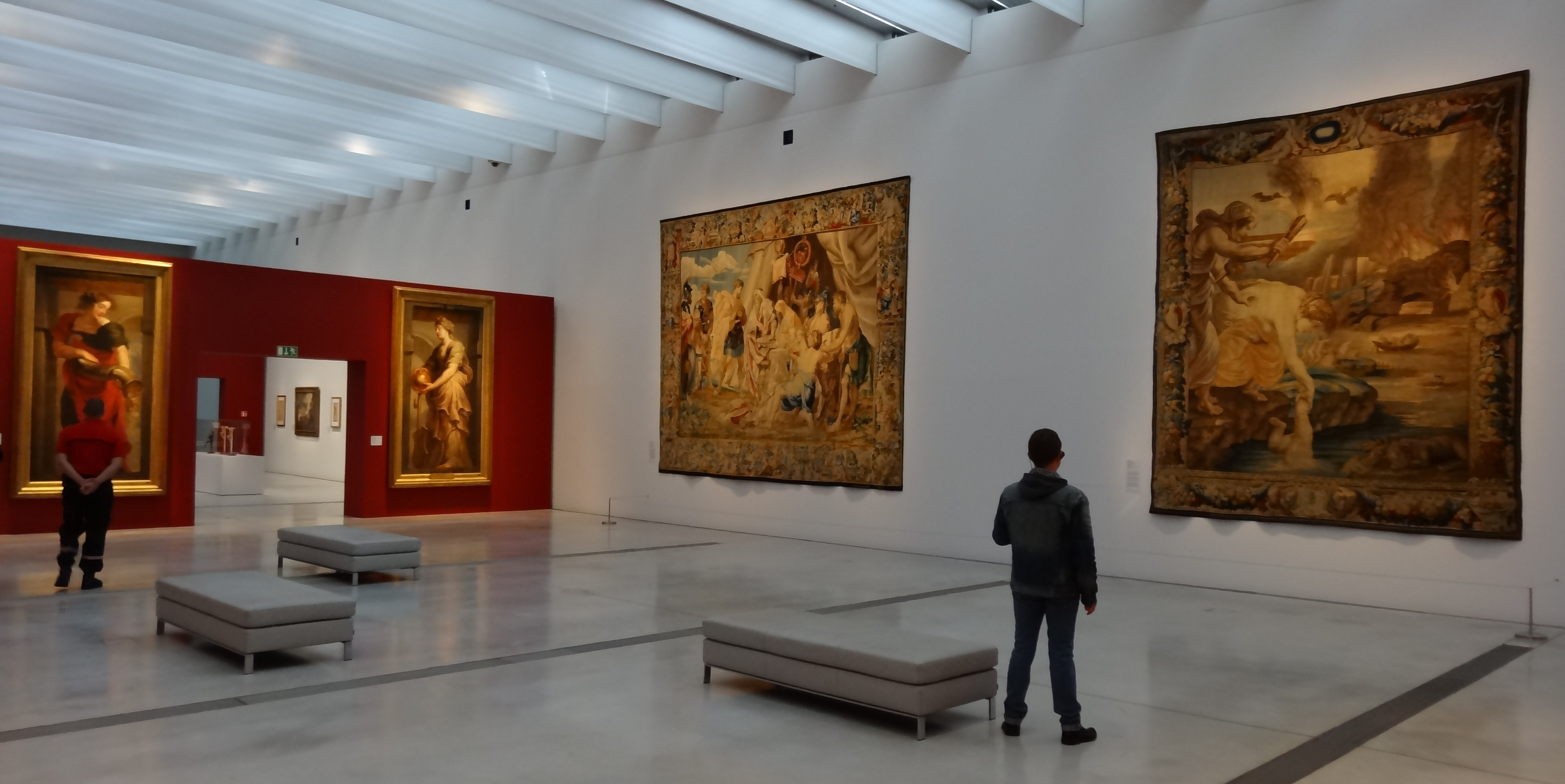
4^{e} salle : Monumentalité éphémère.

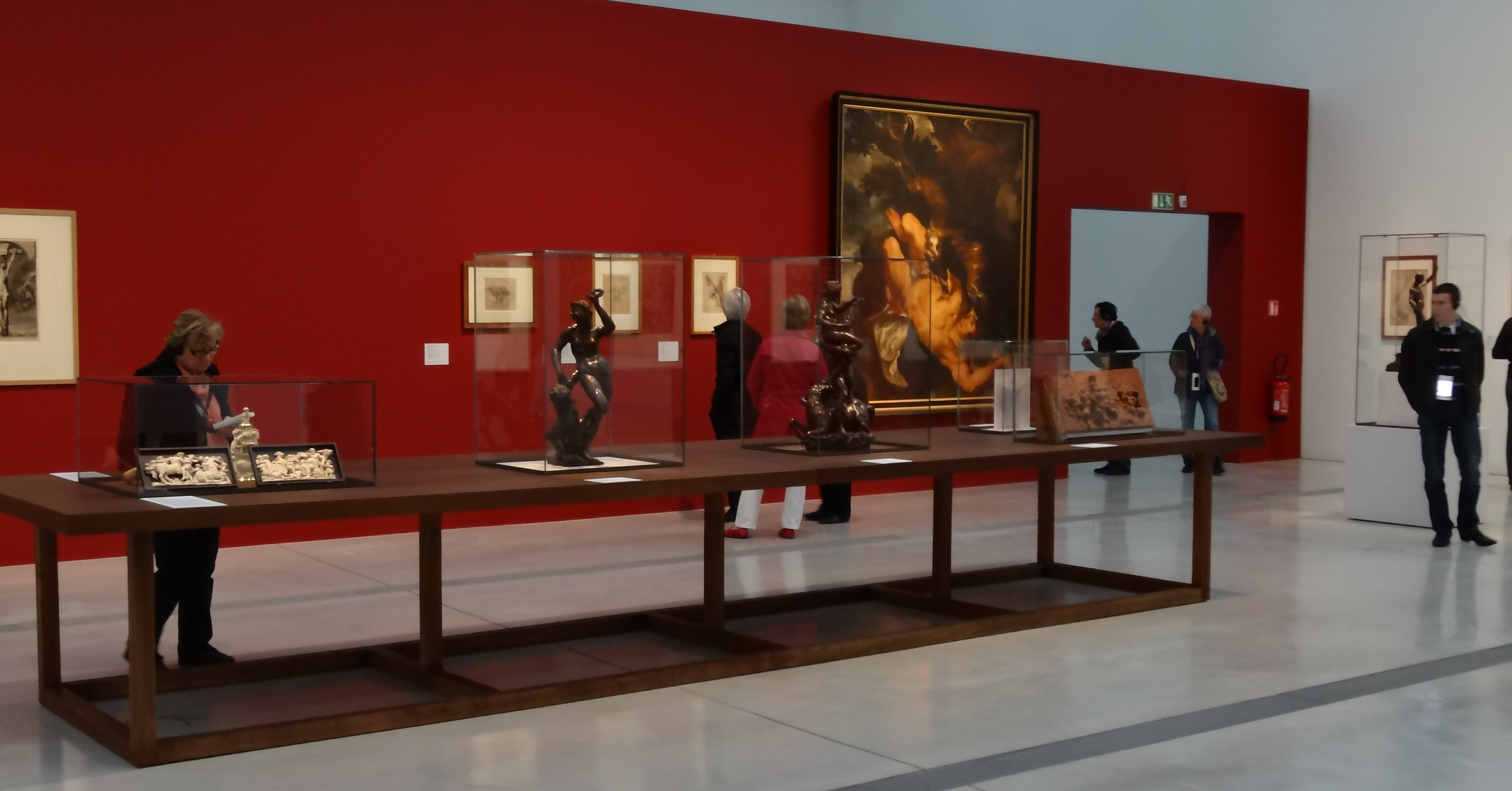
5^{e} salle : Rubens, émulation et concurrence.

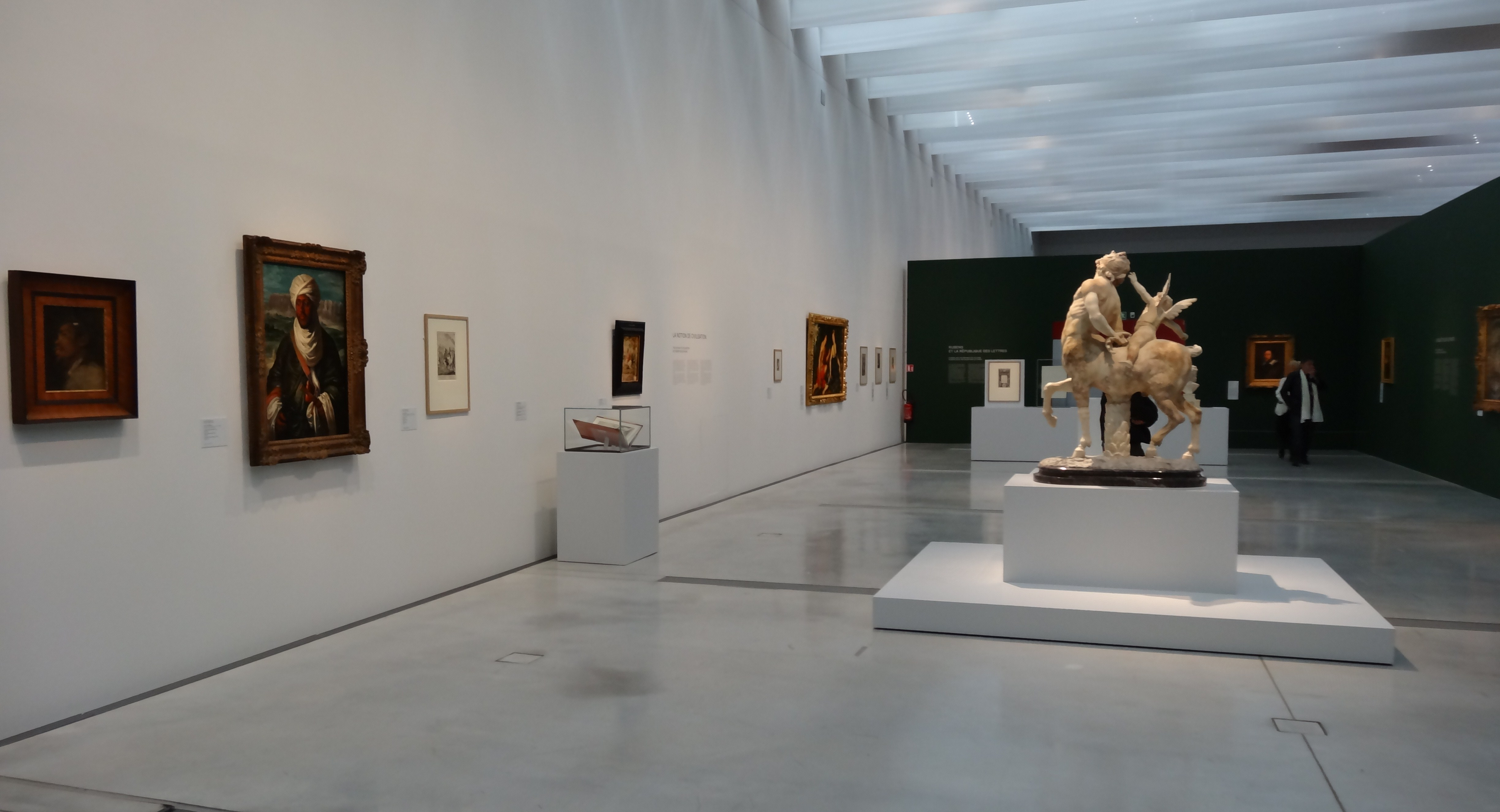
6^{e} salle : Rubens et la république des lettres.

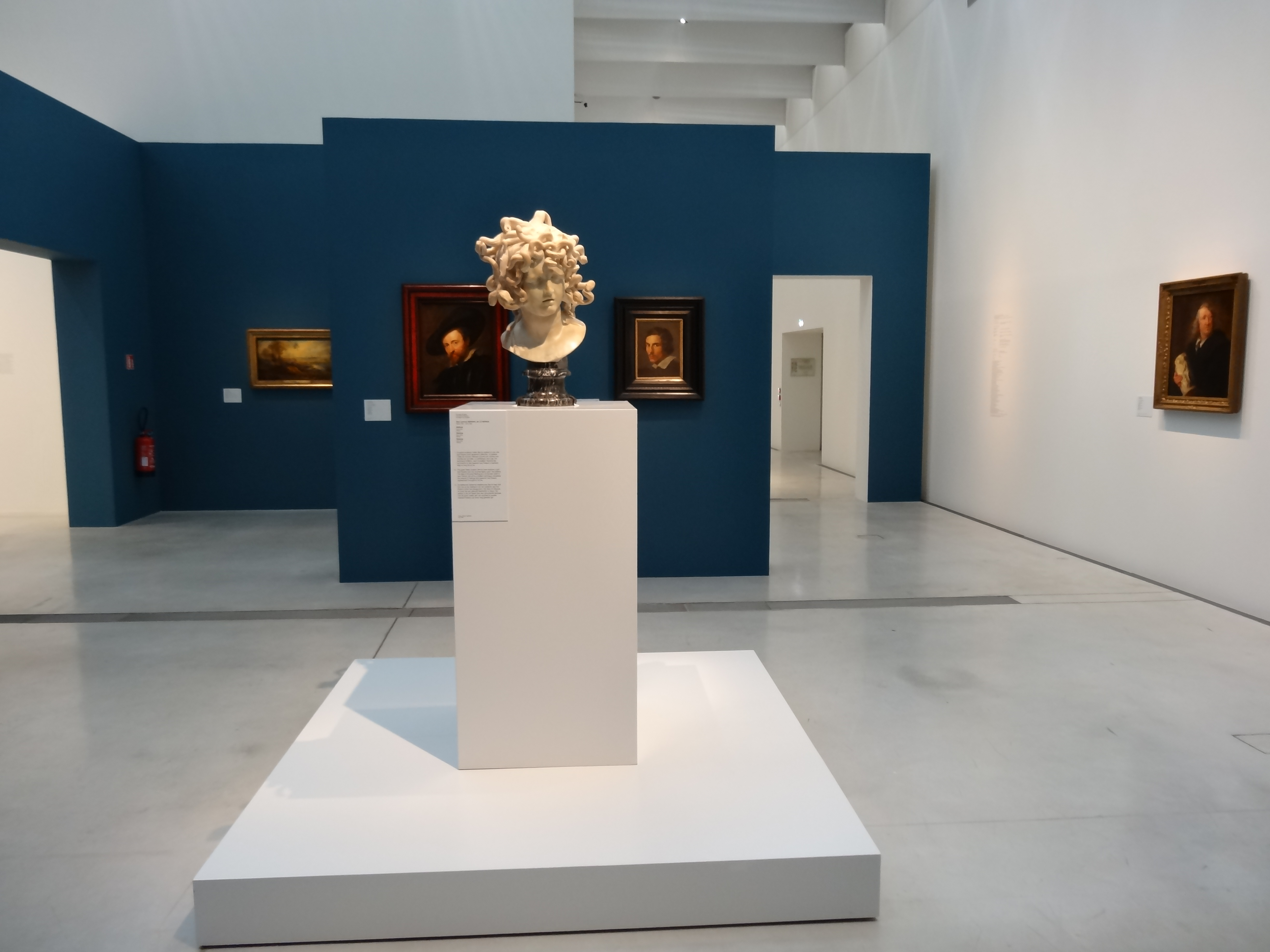
7^{e} salle : Les voies du génie.

== Bibliography ==
- Arnout Balis; Blaise Ducos; Jeroen Duindam; Marc Fumaroli; Paul Huvenne; David Jaffé; Corinne Thépaut-Cabasset (2013). L'Europe de Rubens (in French). Lens & Paris: Musée du Louvre-Lens & Éditions Hazan. ISBN 978-2-36838-012-3.
