= Louvre-Lens =

- Location within France
- Established: 2012
- Location: 99 Rue Paul Bert; 62300 Lens, France
- Coordinates: 50°25′50″N 2°48′12″E
- Type: Art museum, Design/Textile Museum, Historic site
- Visitors: 700,000 the first year, 450 000 in 2017
- Director: Xavier Dectot
- Curator: Xavier Dectot
- Architects: SANAA Kazuyo Sejima & Ryue Nishizawa, Tokyo + Imrey Culbert, New York
- Public transit access: Bus shuttle from gare de Lens
- Website: www.louvrelens.fr/en/

The Louvre-Lens is an art museum located in Lens, France, approximately 200 kilometers north of Paris. It displays objects from the collections of the Musée du Louvre that are lent to the gallery on a medium- or long-term basis. The Louvre-Lens annex is part of an effort to provide access to French cultural institutions for people who live outside of Paris. Though the museum maintains close institutional links with the Louvre, it is primarily funded by the Nord-Pas-de-Calais region.

== History ==
Because of criticism that French art and culture is overly concentrated in Paris, the Ministry of Culture and the Louvre Directorate launched a plan, in 2003, to build a Louvre satellite museum in one of the 22 Regions of France. Only the Nord-Pas-de-Calais applied for the museum and proposed six cities: Lille, Lens, Valenciennes, Calais, Béthune and Boulogne-sur-Mer. In 2004, Jean-Pierre Raffarin, then French Prime Minister, announced Lens as the recipient city.

The museum site was chosen in hopes of reversing the fortunes of the depressed Lens mining community, which was devastated by both World Wars and the Nazi occupation, and suffered multiple mining catastrophes including the Courrières mine disaster in 1906, the worst in European history, and a 1974 tragedy killing 42 miners. The last mine in Lens closed in 1986, which caused the unemployment rate to rise well above the French national average. "France abandoned us when the coal stopped, and we became a ghost town", said Pas-de-Calais president Daniel Percheron.

Officials took inspiration from the economic transformation of the Spanish industrial city of Bilbao, which was caused, in part, by the construction of the Guggenheim Museum Bilbao satellite (dubbed the "Bilbao effect", though some cautioned that the comparison is limited due to the much smaller population of Lens, and its lack of other tourist attractions.) Some Lens locals were critical of the project; they felt that the project to bring culture to their city was "patronizing". Other critics pointed out that the museum makes no attempt to address Lens's turbulent history or its current economic difficulties.

A worldwide design contest was won by Japanese architectural firm SANAA in collaboration with New York firm Imrey Culbert, French landscape architect Catherine Mosbach, and museographer Studio Adrien Gardère. The Louvre-Lens Museum, SANAA + Imrey Culbert's first building in France, was awarded the Prix d'architecture de l'Equerre d'Argent for 2013.

The Louvre-Lens is near several World War memorials, including the Canadian National Vimy Memorial in Vimy, approximately 15 minutes from the Louvre-Lens.

== Museum ==
=== Architecture ===
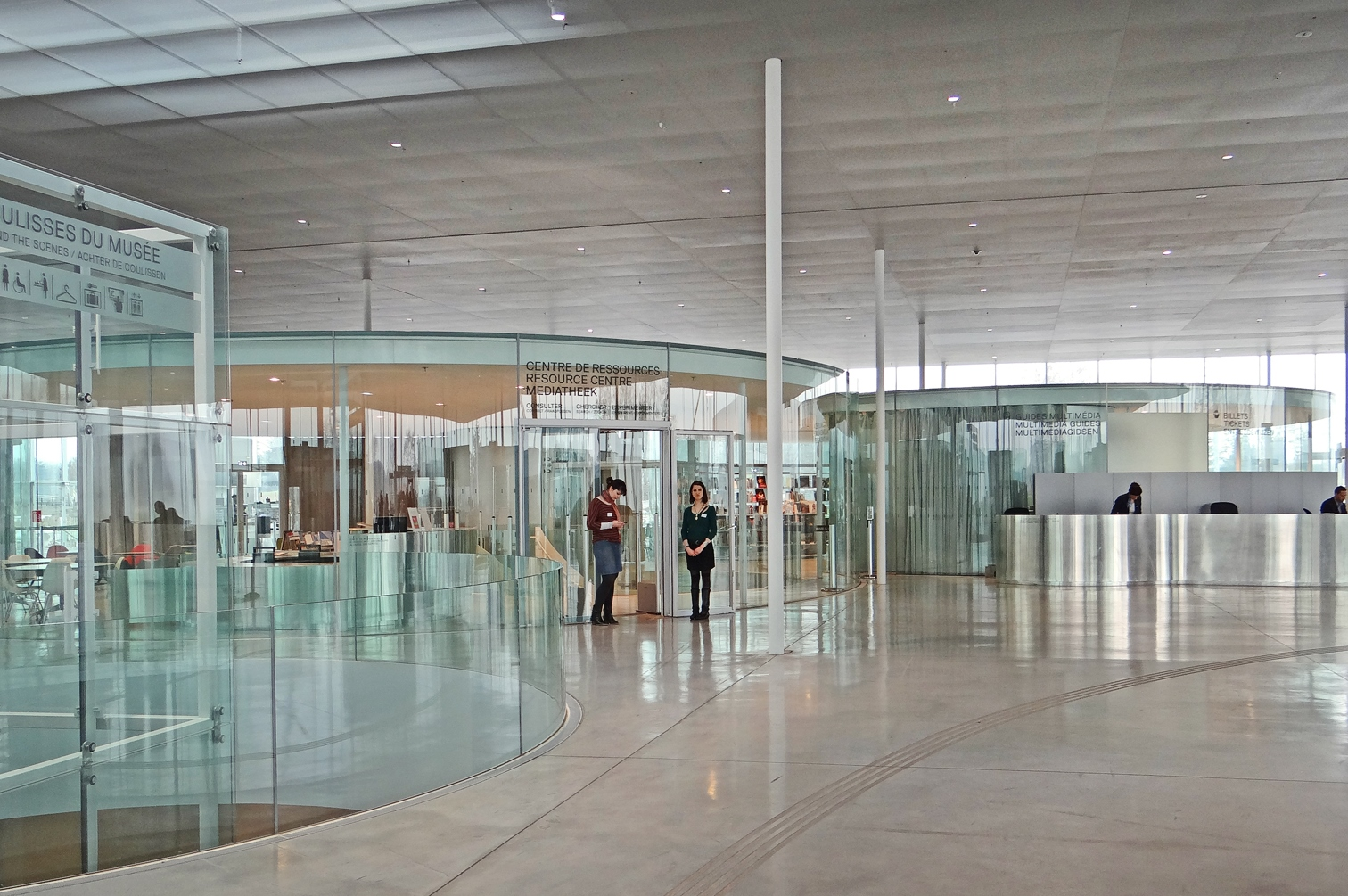
The reception hall

The museum is built on a 20-hectare (49-acre) mining site that closed in the 1960s. The area is slightly elevated due to filling in of the mine. To make the building blend into the surrounding area, the architects designed a string of five low-profile structures; the central one is square with glass walls and the others are rectangular with polished, aluminum facades that gave a blurry reflection of the surroundings. Altogether, the museum is 360 m (1,180 ft) long and contains 28,000 m^{2} (300,000 sq ft) of exhibition space.

The design of a central building flanked by two wings mimics the Paris Louvre. The square, central building is the main reception area. It contains several curved glass rooms that contain a cafeteria, bookstore and museum boutique. To the east of the entry hall is the 3,000 m^{2} (32,000 sq ft) Galerie du Temps which houses approximately 200 items from the Paris Louvre collection. The items in the large, open hall are arranged chronologically, from 3,500 BC to the mid-19th century, regardless of style or country of origin. Beyond the Galerie du Temps is the Pavillon de Verre which exhibits works from neighboring museums. The building to the west of the entry hall is a gallery for temporary exhibits (the Exhibitions Temporaires) and, beyond that, an auditorium.

The Galerie du Temps

=== Temporary exhibits ===
The Exhibitions Temporaires is dedicated to exhibits which last 3 months. The first exhibition, titled Renaissance, included Leonardo da Vinci's recently restored The Virgin and Child with St. Anne. The second exhibit, Rubens' Europe, was dedicated to Rubens and included 170 of his works.

== Inauguration, opening and visitors ==
On December 4, 2012, President François Hollande, alongside first lady Valérie Trierweiler, the Minister of Culture Aurélie Filippetti, the director of Le Louvre Henri Loyrette, the mayor of Lens Guy Delcourt, and former prime ministers Lionel Jospin and Pierre Mauroy officially opened the Louvre-Lens. The following weekend, the museum welcomed its first visitors; three weeks after the opening, the museum welcomed its 100,000th visitor. In May 2013, during Long Night of Museums 2013, 500,000 visitors viewed the masterpieces displayed in the Louvre-Lens Museum. While 700,000 visitors were anticipated for the first year (while admission was free), the year's final tally was approximately 900,000.

On February 7, 2013, a woman vandalized a major masterpiece of the museum, Liberty Leading the People, writing "AE911" on it with a black marker, possibly a reference to a group calling itself "Architects & Engineers for 9/11 Truth". The painting has been fully restored.

== Gallery ==
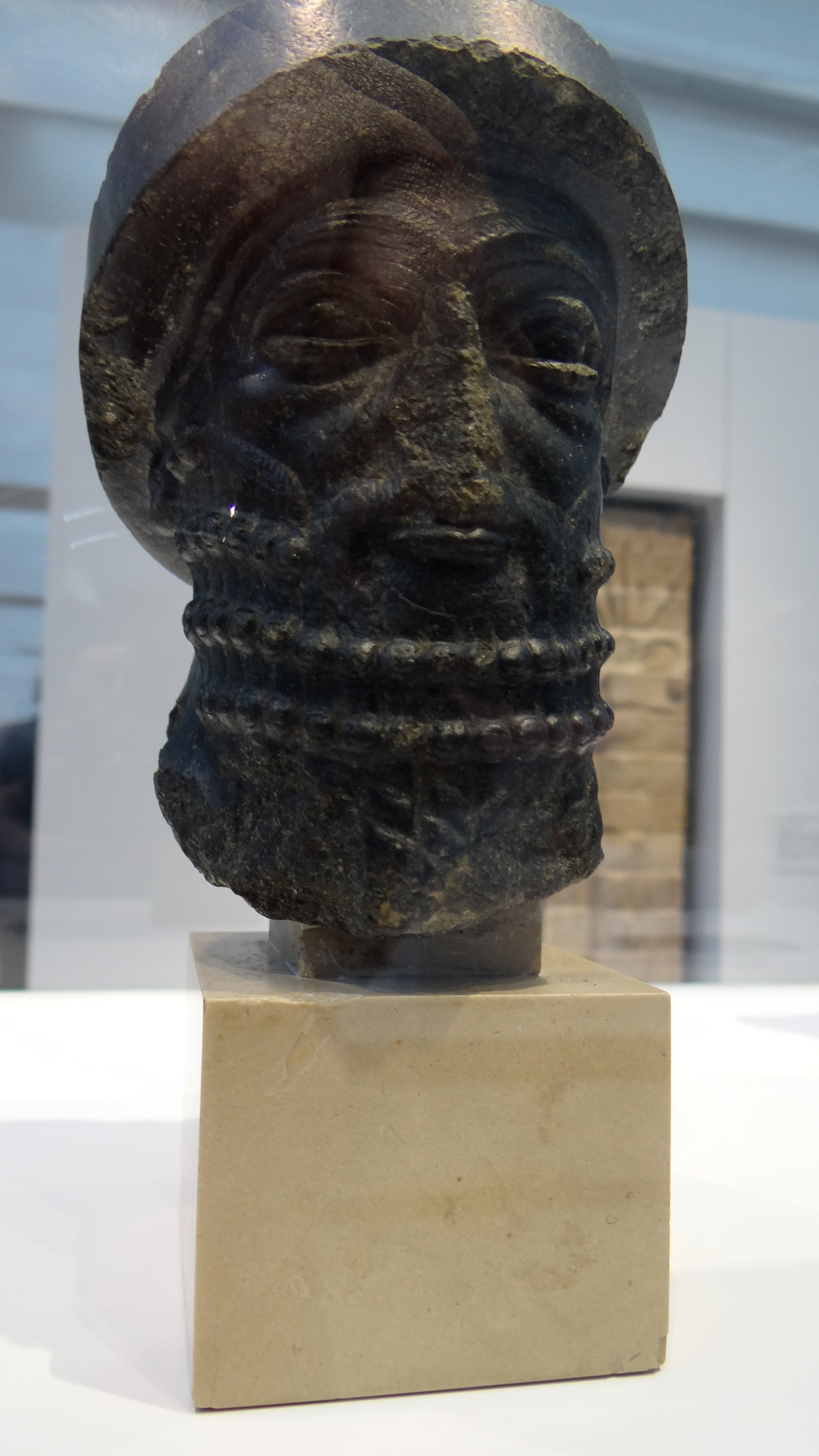
A royal head thought to represent Hammurabi, King of Babylon (c. 2000 BC)

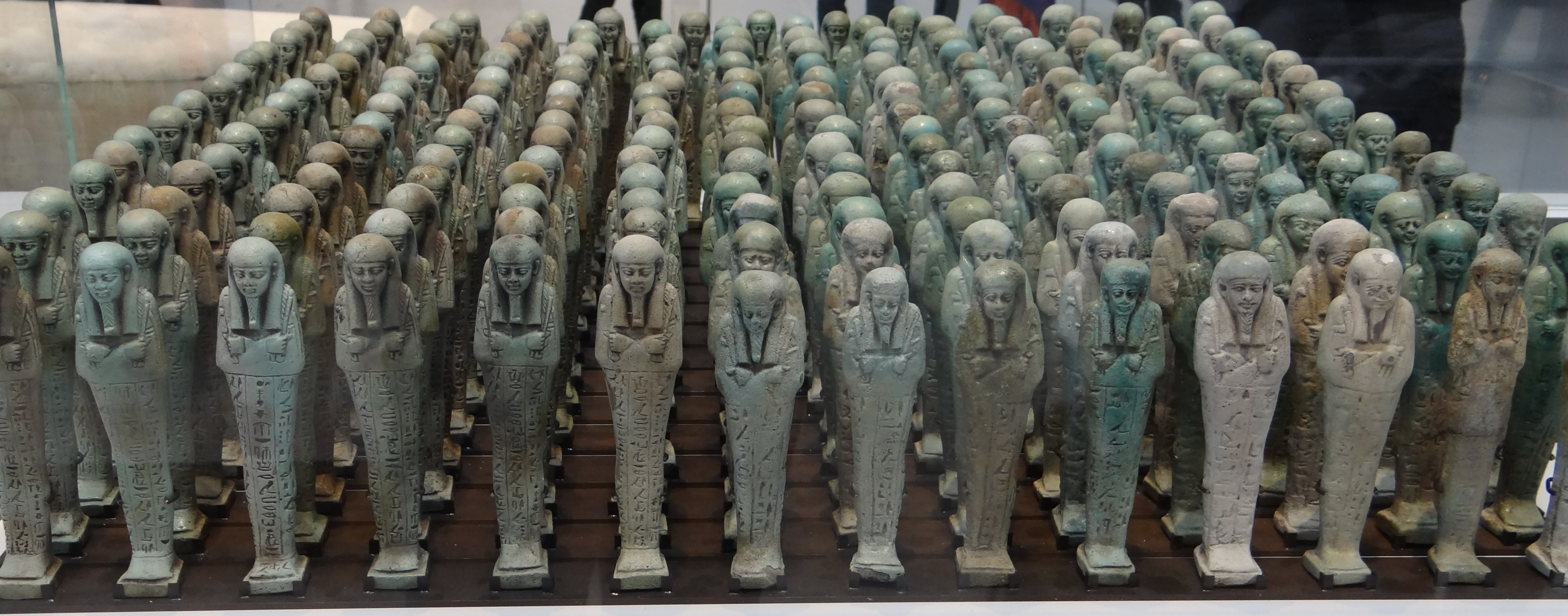
A group of ushabti from the tomb of Neferibreheb in Memphis, Egypt (c. 500 BC)

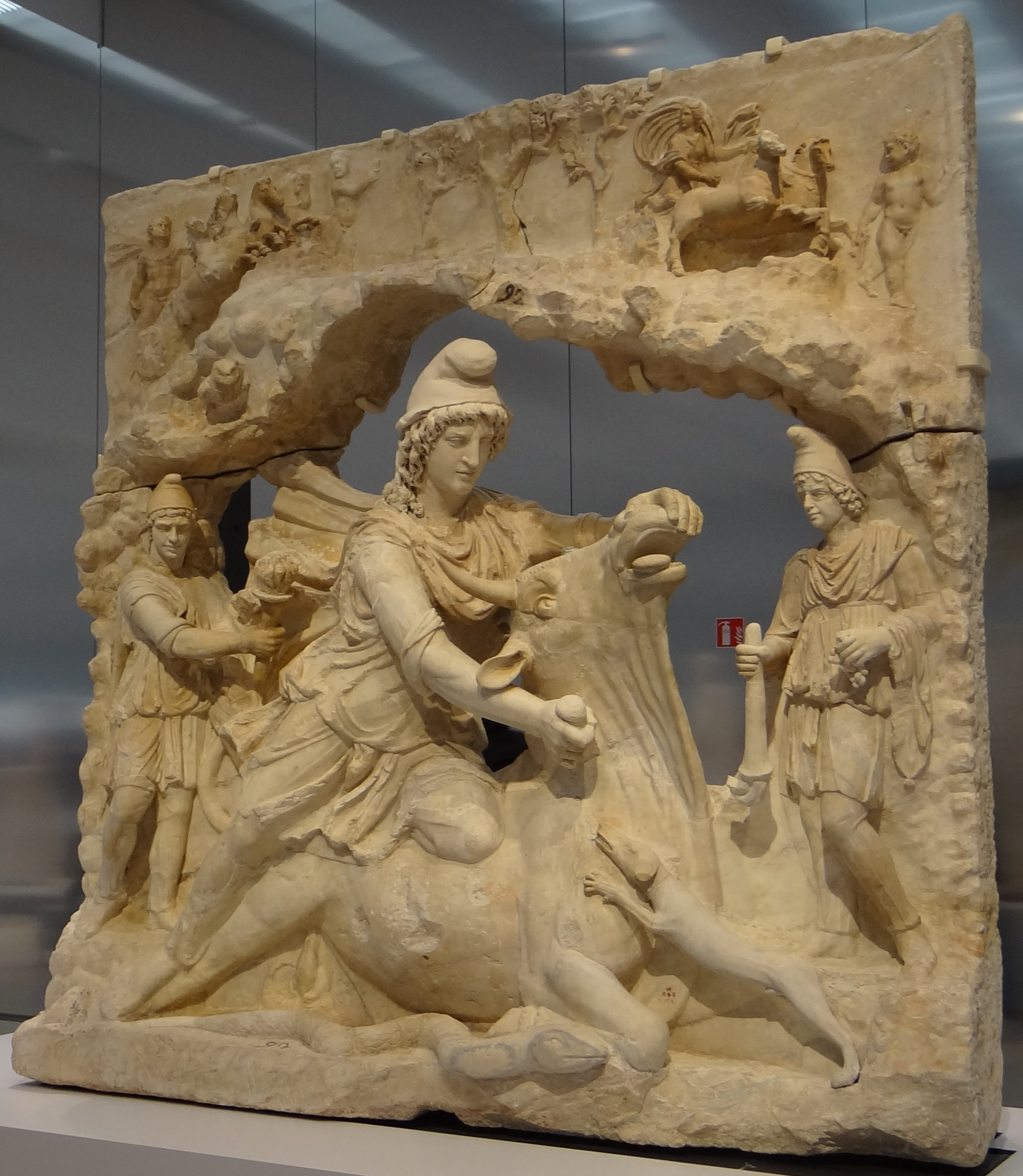
Mithra sacrificing the bull (c. 100–200 AD)

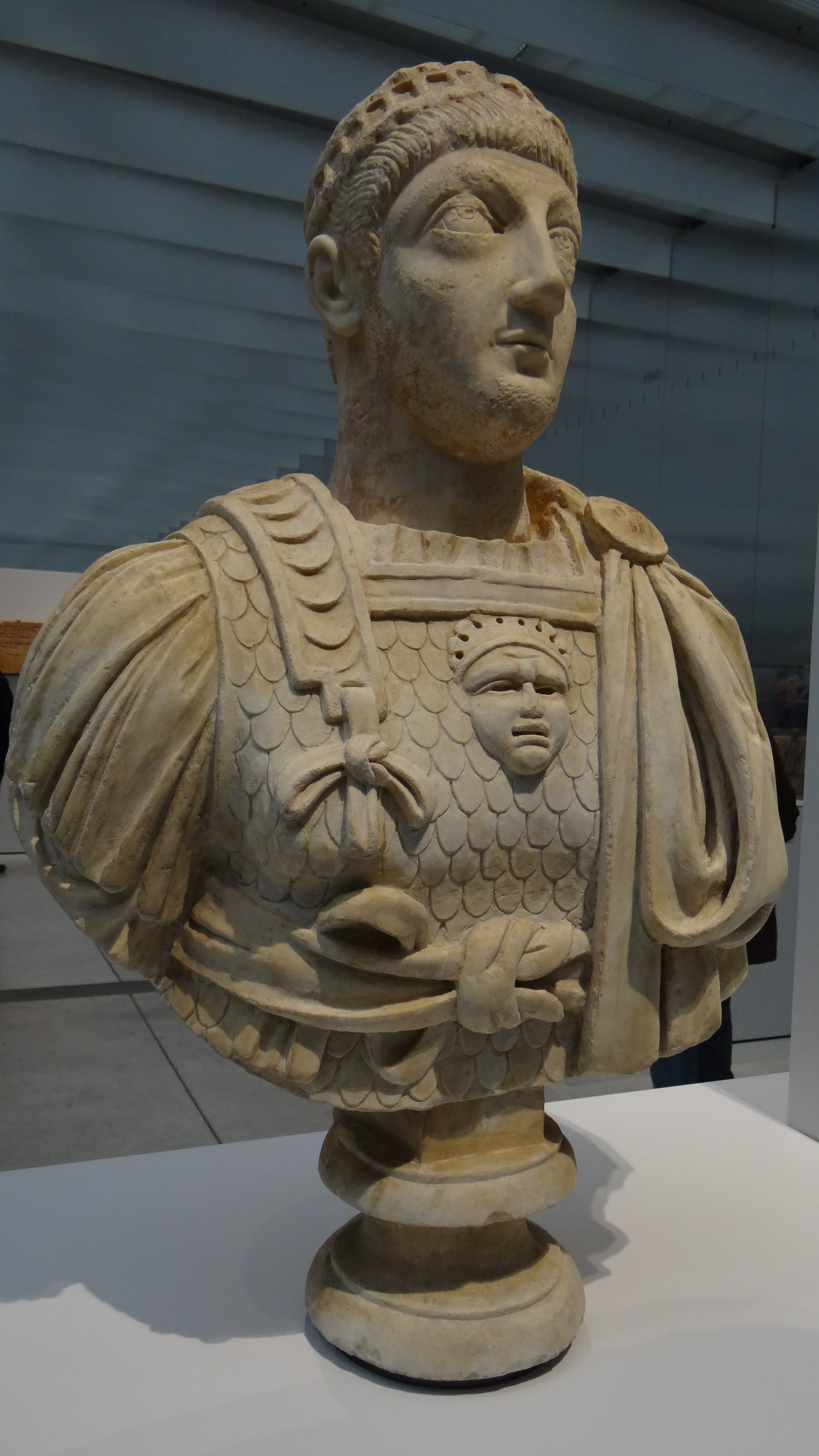
A prince of the family of the Emperor of the East, Theodosius II (Italy, c. 440 AD)

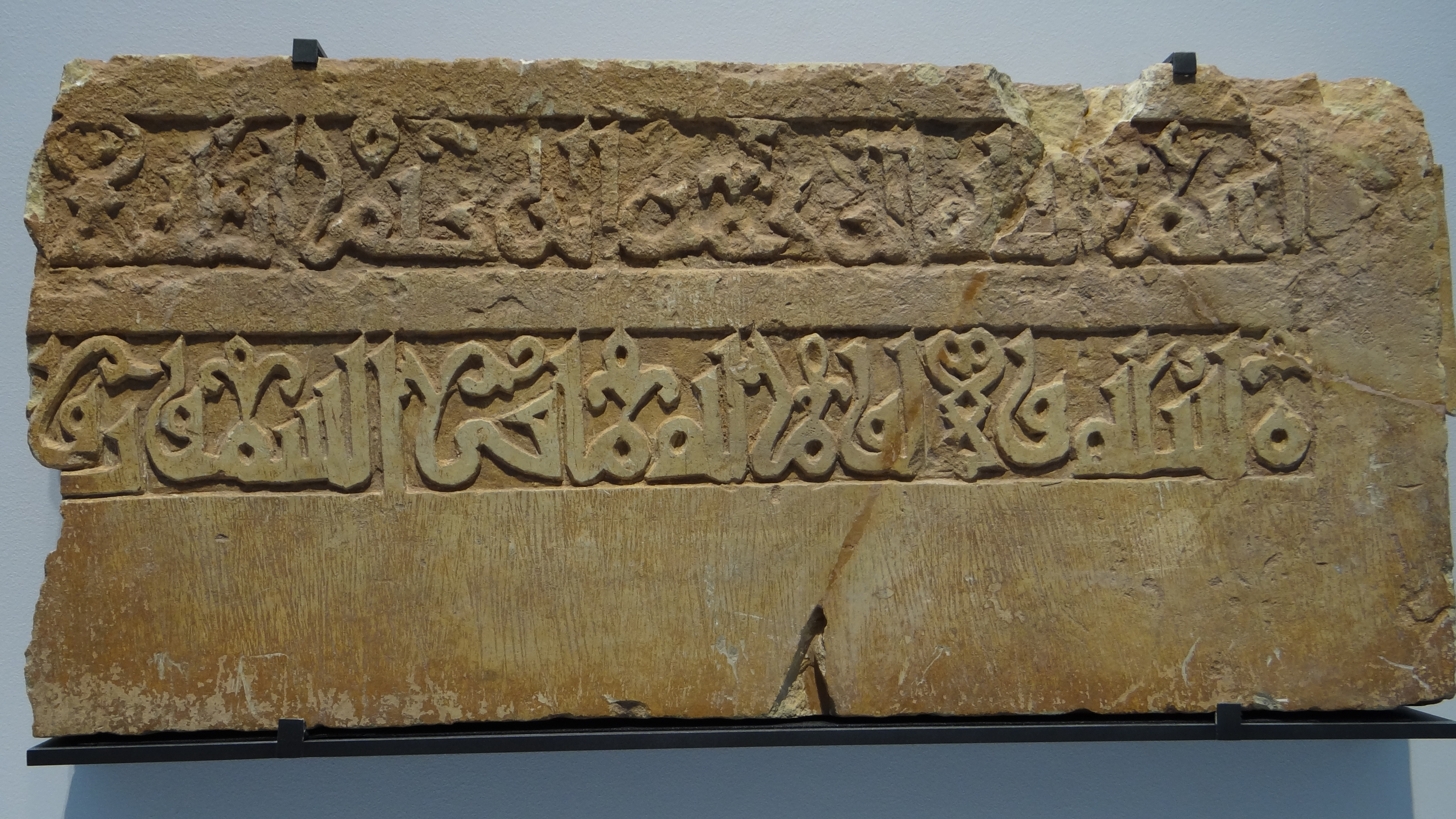
A fragment of an architectural frieze from Raqqa with a Koranic inscription in angular Arabic (1100–1200)

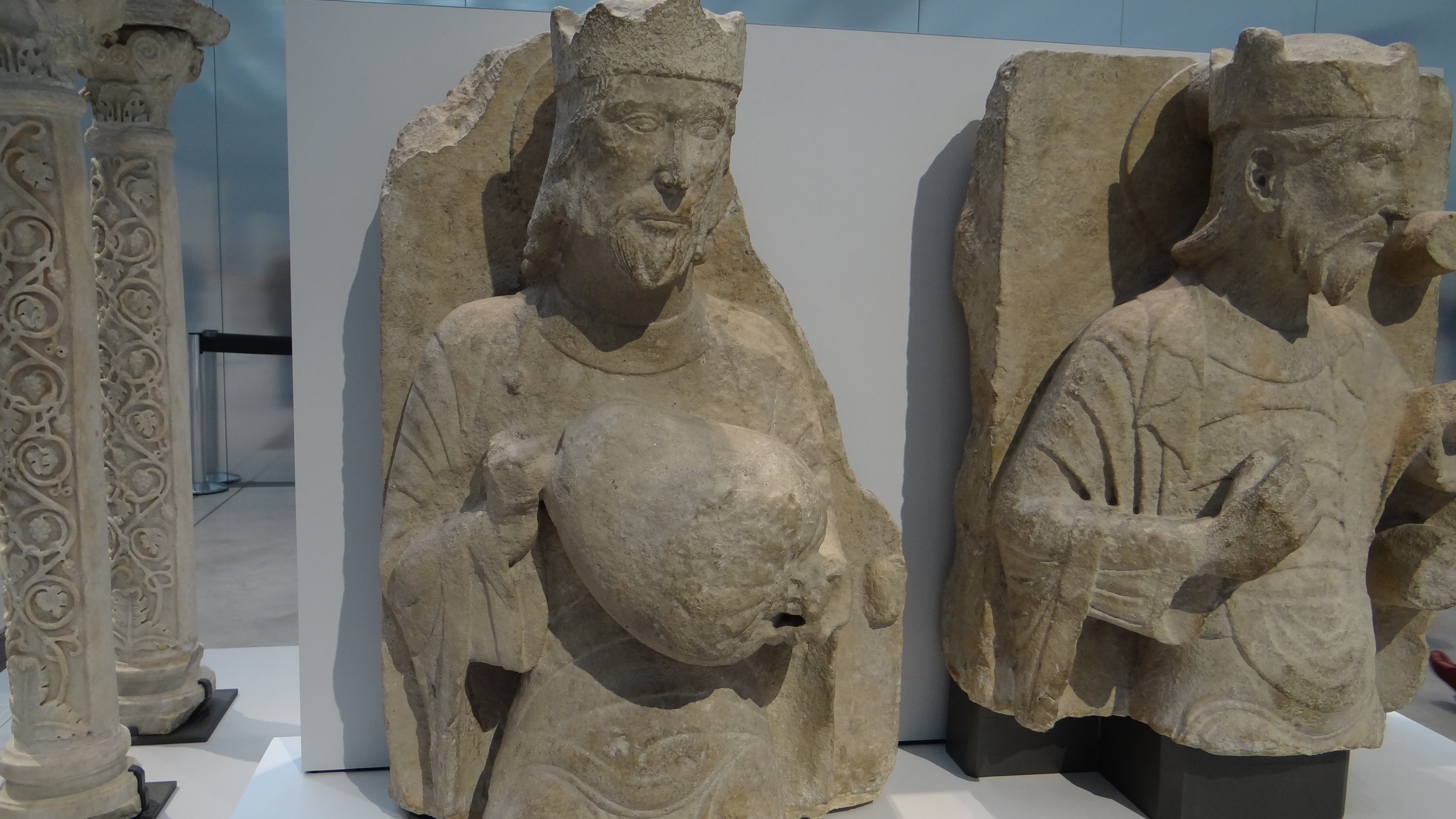
Busts of kings of France from Notre Dame de la Couldre in Parthenay, France (c. 1150–1200)

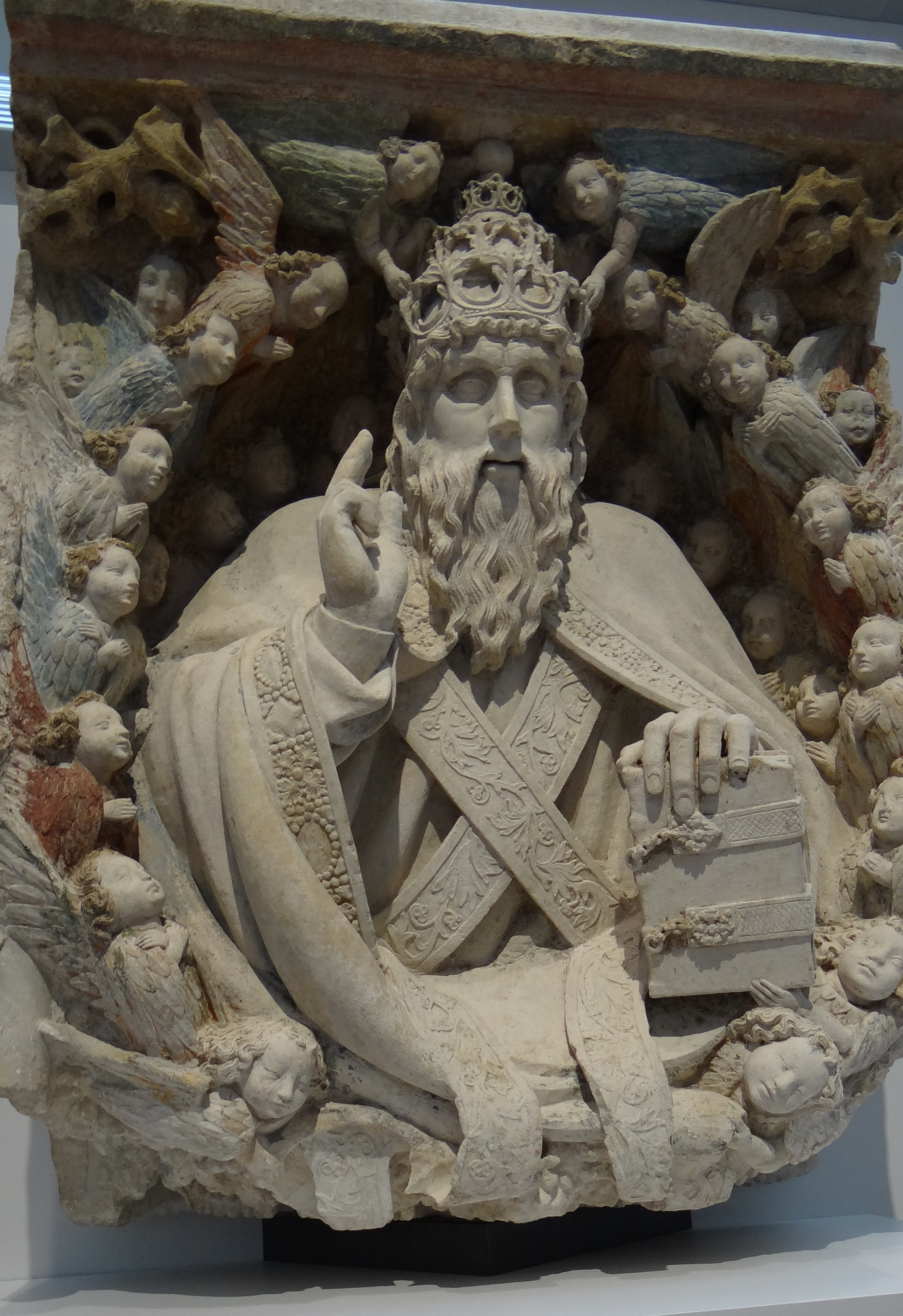
A fragment of a chapel of the Saint-Sepulcre in Chaumont-en-Bassigny (1475)

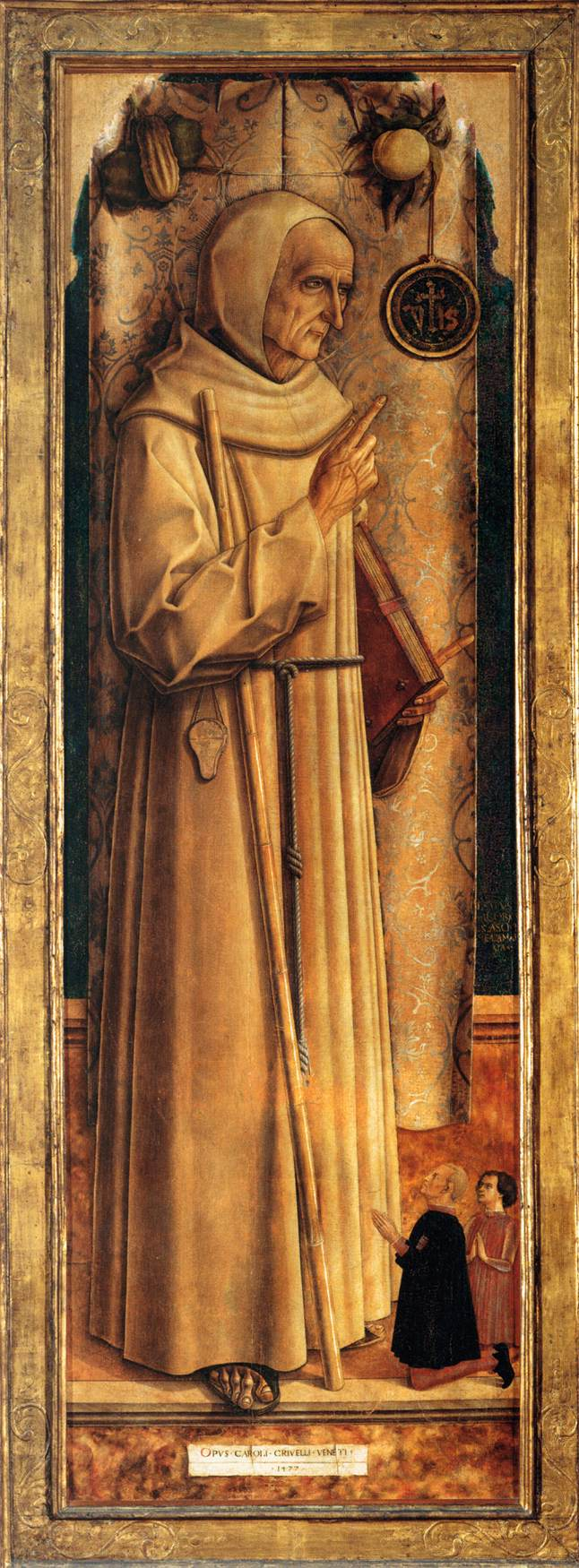
James of the Marches by Carlo Crivelli (1477)

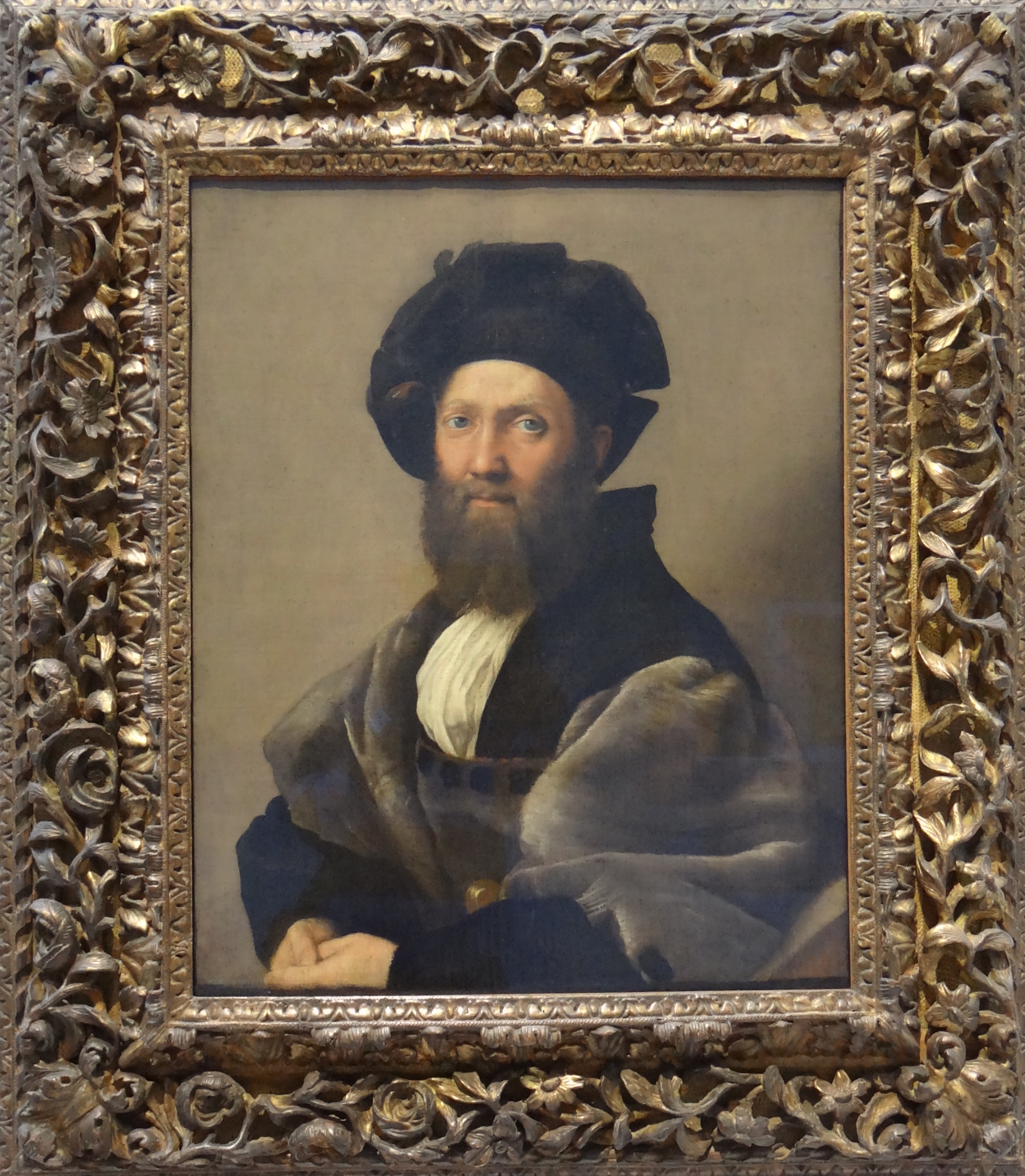
Portrait of Baldassare Castiglione by Raphael (c. 1514–1515)

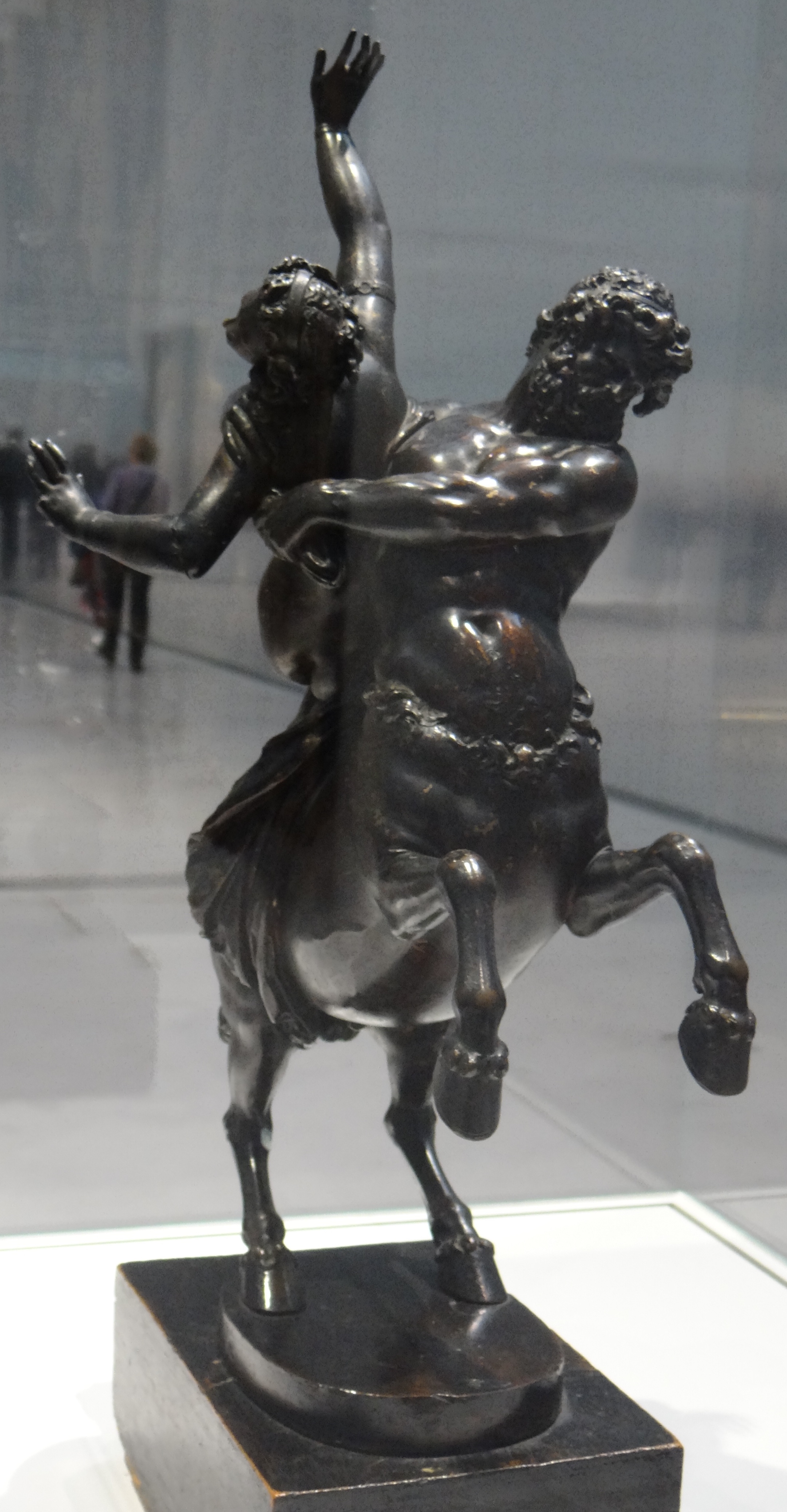
The Abduction of Deianira by Giambologna (c. 1576)

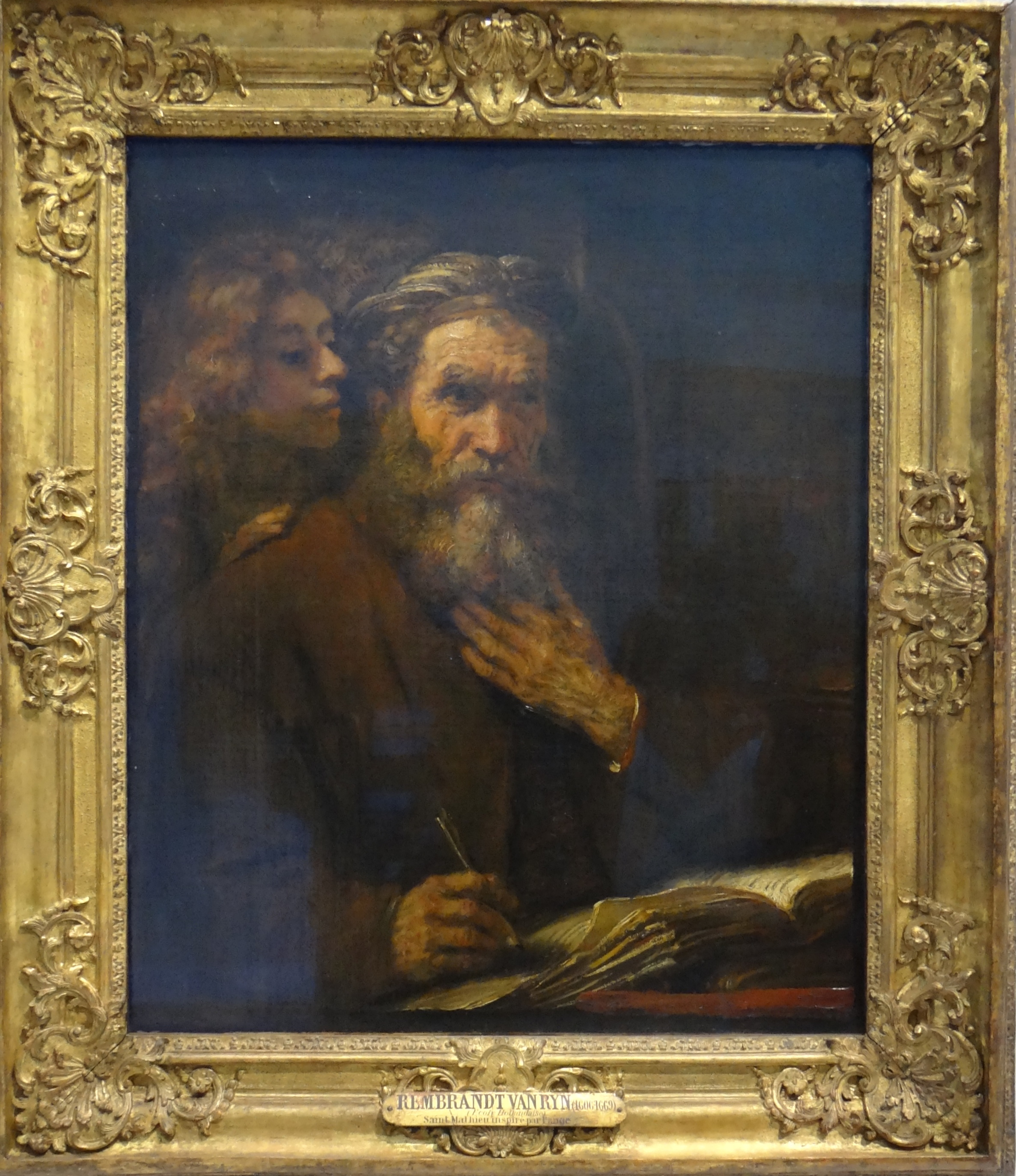
Saint Matthew by Rembrandt (1661)

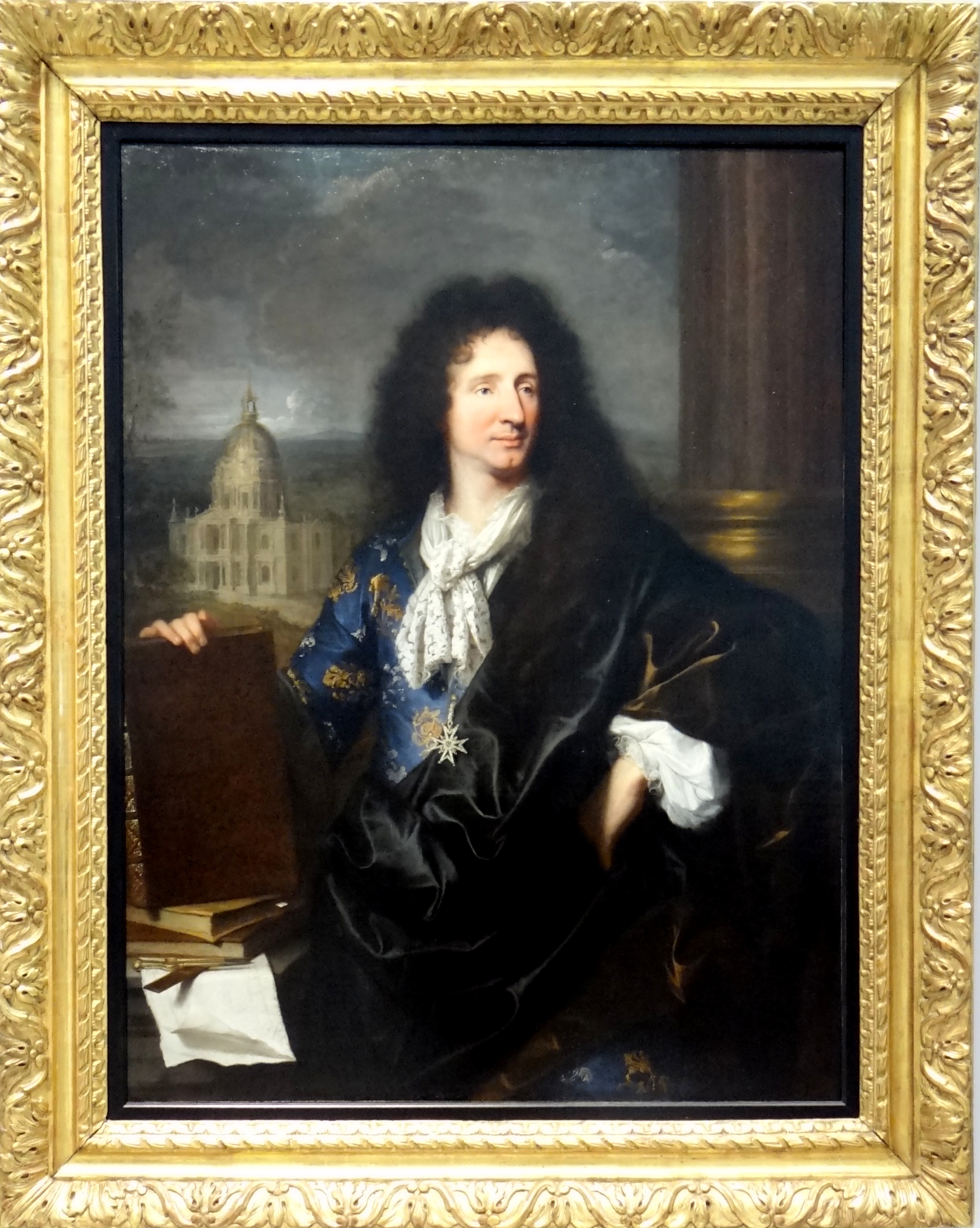
Jules Hardouin-Mansart by Hyacinthe Rigaud (1685)

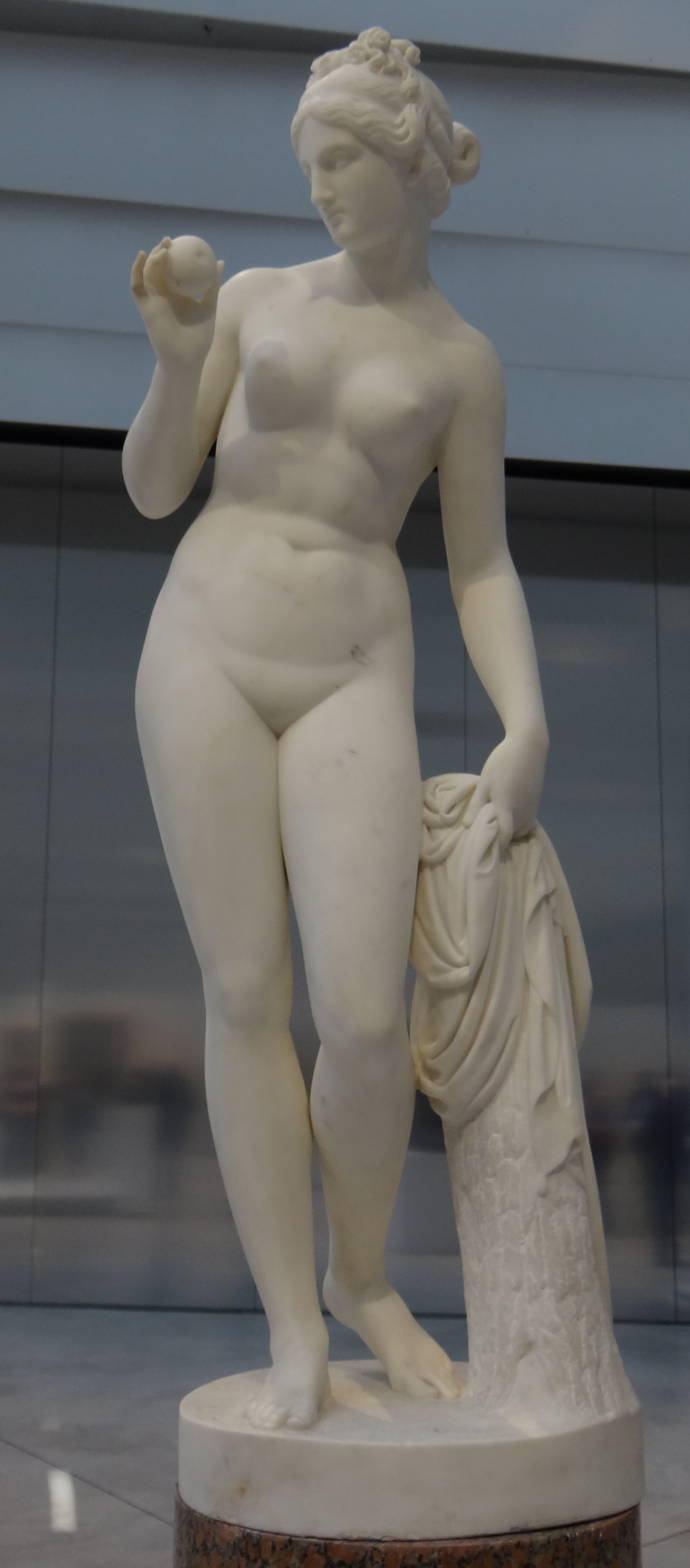
Venus with Apple by Bertel Thorvaldsen (1805)

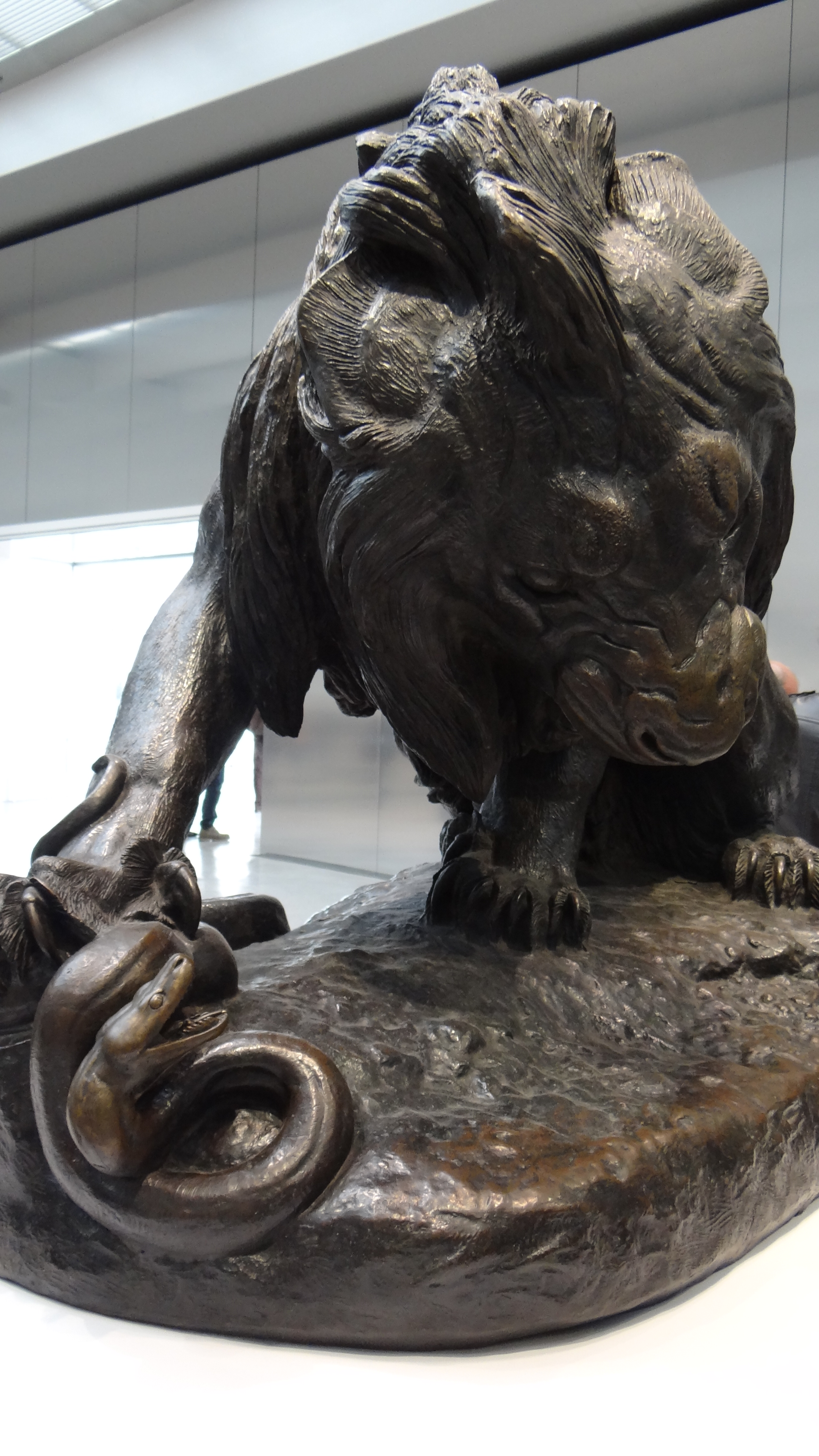
Lion with a Snake by Antoine-Louis Barye (1832, cast by Honoré Gonon in 1835)

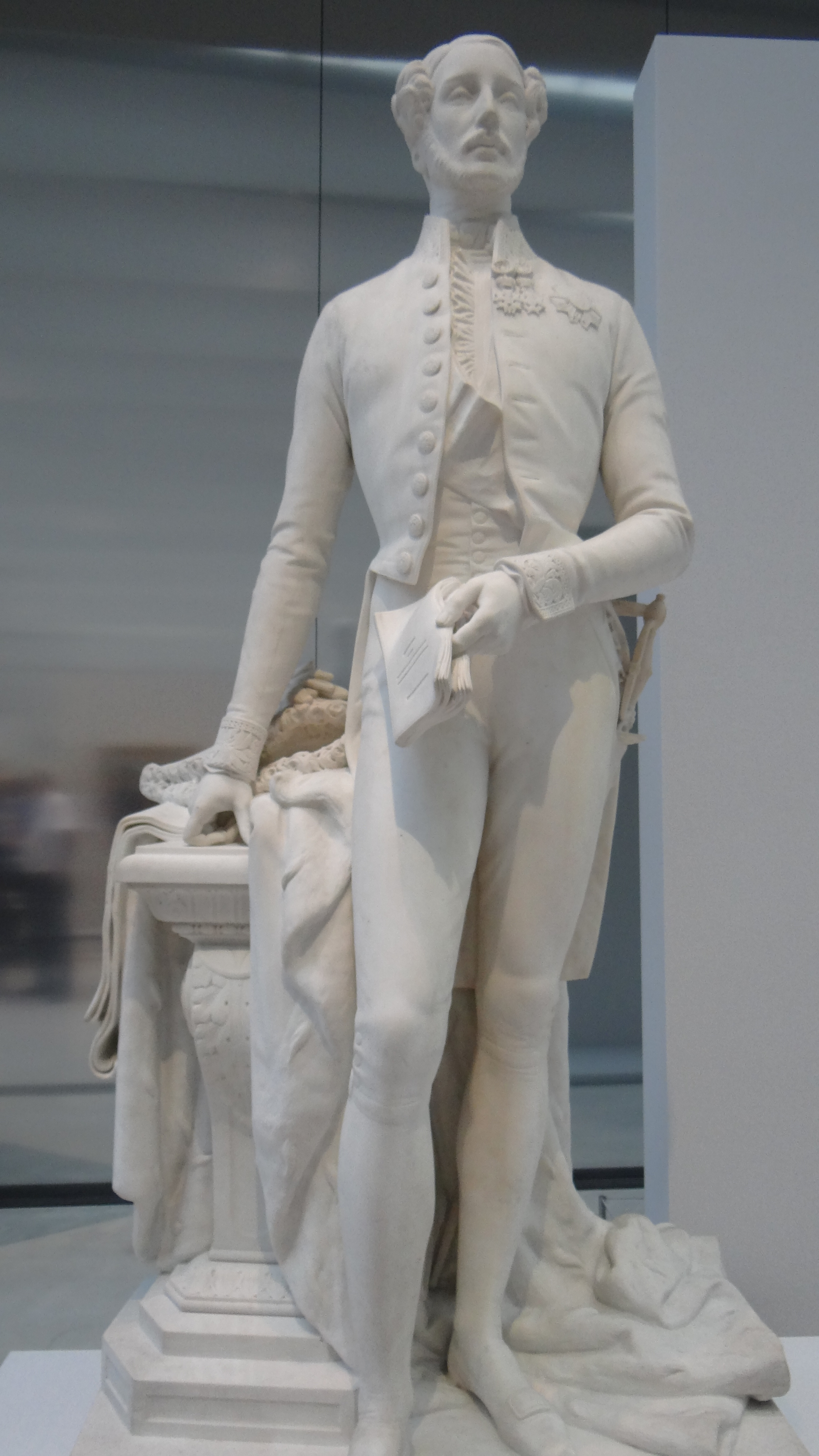
Prince Ferdinand Philippe, Duke of Orléans by Jean-Louis Jaley (1844)
