= Xavier Dectot =

French curator and art historian

- Born: June 8, 1973 (age 53); Pithiviers, France
- Occupation: museum curator

Academic background
- Education: École des chartes Institut national du patrimoine Casa de Velázquez; École pratique des hautes études
- Thesis: Une politique de la mort: Tombeaux royaux de la péninsule ibérique, XIe–XIIIe siècle

Academic work
- Discipline: art history
- Institutions: École du Louvre; Musée de Cluny; Louvre-Lens; National Museum of Scotland; Lusail Museum

Xavier Dectot (French: [ɡzavje dɛkto]), born on June 8, 1973 in Pithiviers, is a French museum curator and art historian.

A former curator at the Musée de Cluny, specialising in sculptures and ivories from the Middle Ages, he has been director of the Louvre-Lens from 2011 to 2016 and Keeper of Art and Design at the National Museum of Scotland in Edinburgh from 2016 to 2019. Since 2019, he is the director of the Lusail Museum in Doha, Qatar.

== Biography ==
=== Education ===
He studied in the École des chartes, from which he graduated in 1998 with a thesis titled La Mort en Champagne : étude de l’art funéraire aux XIIe-XIIIe siècles), in the Institut national du patrimoine, where he entered in 1997, but only graduated in 2001 as he interrupted his studies to complete his PhD, at the Casa de Velázquez (from 1998 to 2000) and at the École pratique des hautes études (where he obtained his PhD on medieval funerary art in 2001).

=== Career ===
Professor at the École du Louvre, he started his curatorial career in the Musée de Cluny in 2001, in charge of ivories and sculptures, and extensively published the latter collection in paper and online catalogues.

On 27 March 2011, he was appointed as the founding director of the Louvre-Lens Museum.

In 2016, he left that position to become Keeper of Art and Design at National Museum of Scotland in Edinburgh.

In 2019, he joined Qatar Museums as director of the Orientalist Museum, since then renamed Lusail Museum.

== Works ==
- Art ou politique, Arcs, statues et colonnes de Paris (avec Geneviève Bresc-Bautier), Action artistique de la ville de Paris, 1999
- L'Art roman en France, musée du Louvre-Hazan, 2004
- Catalogne romane, sculptures du val de Boí (avec Jordi Camps), RMN-Musée national du Moyen Âge, 2004
- Sculptures des XIe-XIIe siècles, roman et premier art gothique, RMN-Musée national du Moyen Âge, 2005
- Pierres tombales médiévales, sculptures de l'au-delà, Remparts, 2006
- Céramiques hispaniques, XIIe-XVIIIe siècles, RMN-Musée national du Moyen Âge, 2008
- Reflets d'or, d'orient en occident : la céramique lustrée, IXe-XVe siècle, RMN-Musée national du Moyen Âge, 2008
- Les Tombeaux des familles royales de la péninsule ibérique au Moyen Âge, Brepols, 2009
- Paris, Ville rayonnante (avec Meredith Cohen), RMN-Musée national du Moyen Âge, 2010
- Sculptures du XIIIe siècle, collections du musée de Cluny, RMN-Musée national du Moyen Âge, 2010
- D'or et de feu : l'art en Slovaquie à la fin du Moyen Âge (avec Dušan Buran et Jean-Christophe Ton-That), RMN-Musée national du Moyen Âge, 2010
- À la table de l'histoire, recettes revisitées, des banquets antiques à aujourd'hui (with Marion Godfroy), Flammarion, 2011
