= Arboretum des Grandes Bruyères =

Botanical garden in France

Coordinates: 47.836°N 2.757°E

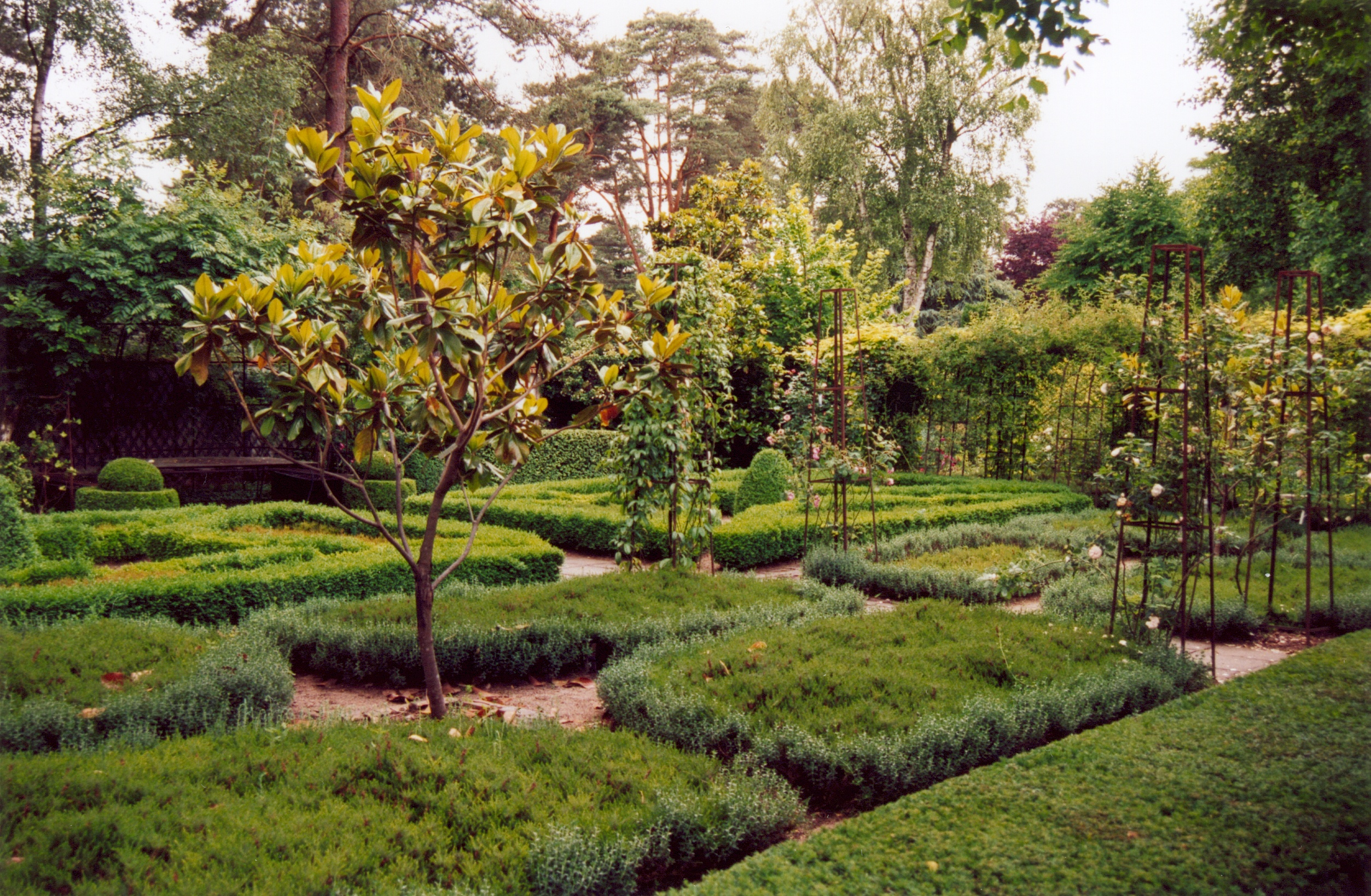
Arboretum des Grandes Bruyères

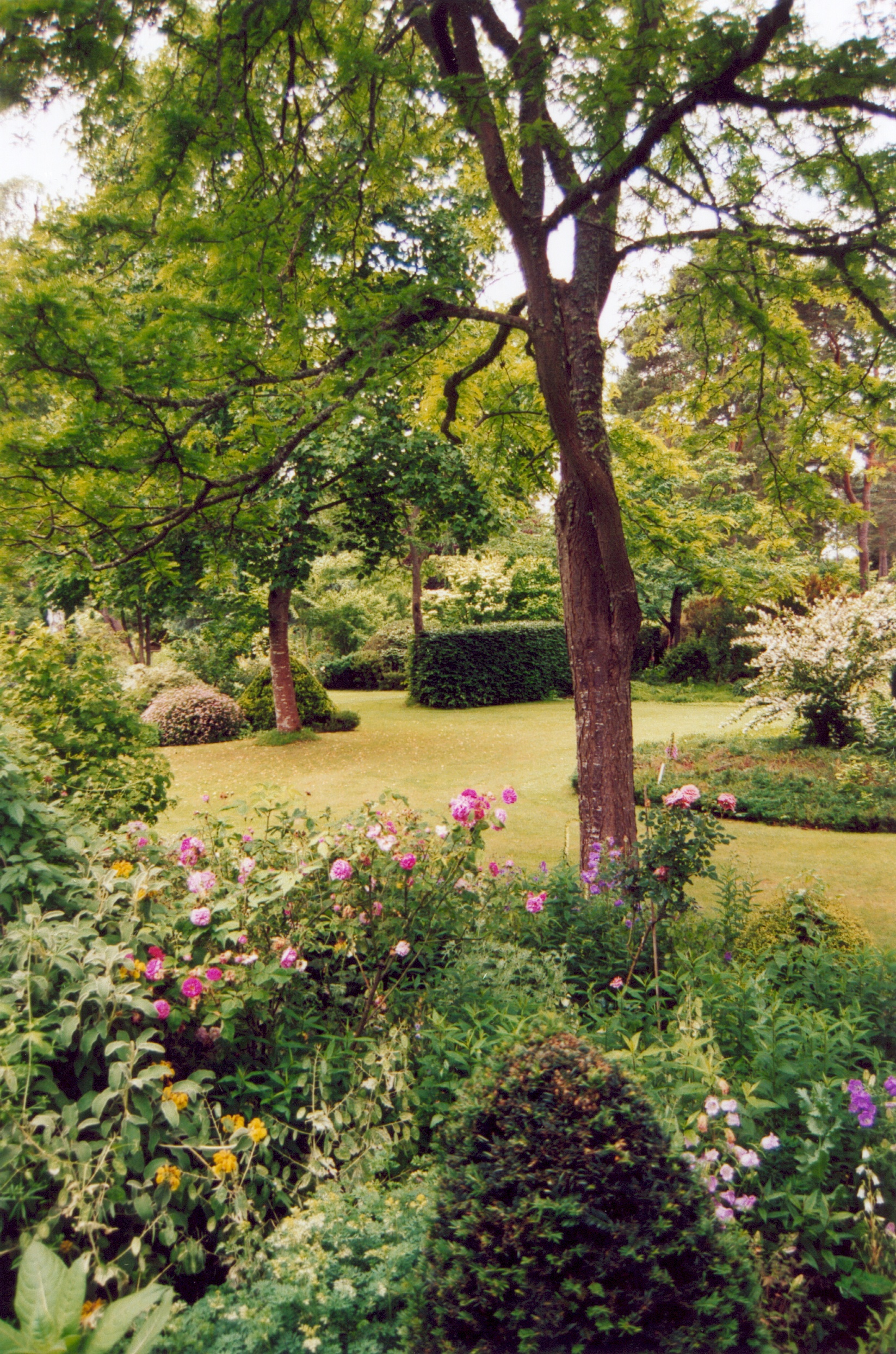
Another view

The Arboretum des Grandes Bruyères (12 hectares), sometimes called the Arboretum d'Ingrannes, is a private arboretum set within the Forêt d'Orléans south of Ingrannes, Loiret, Centre-Val de Loire, France. It is open on Sundays in the warmer months; an admission fee is charged.

The arboretum was established in 1968 by M and Mme de la Rochefoucald, with first plantings in 1973. It is owned by the Mansart Foundation, and has received national recognition by the Conservatoire des Collections Végétales Spécialisées (CCVS) for its collections of Magnolia and Cornus. In 2004 it was designated a Jardin Remarquable by the French ministry of culture.

Today the arboretum contains about 4,500 woody plants representing 2,500 taxa from the Northern Hemisphere's three temperate zones of Europe, North America, and the Far East, organized as eight gardens and two arboreta (6 hectares) planted by geographical origin. As well as national collections of Magnolia and Cornus species, the arboretum contains 500 varieties of Ericaceae (bruyère) and 800 cultivars of old garden roses. The grounds also contain a labyrinth and an English garden inspired by Gertrude Jekyll.

== See also ==
- List of botanical gardens in France
