= Ingrannes =

- Commune
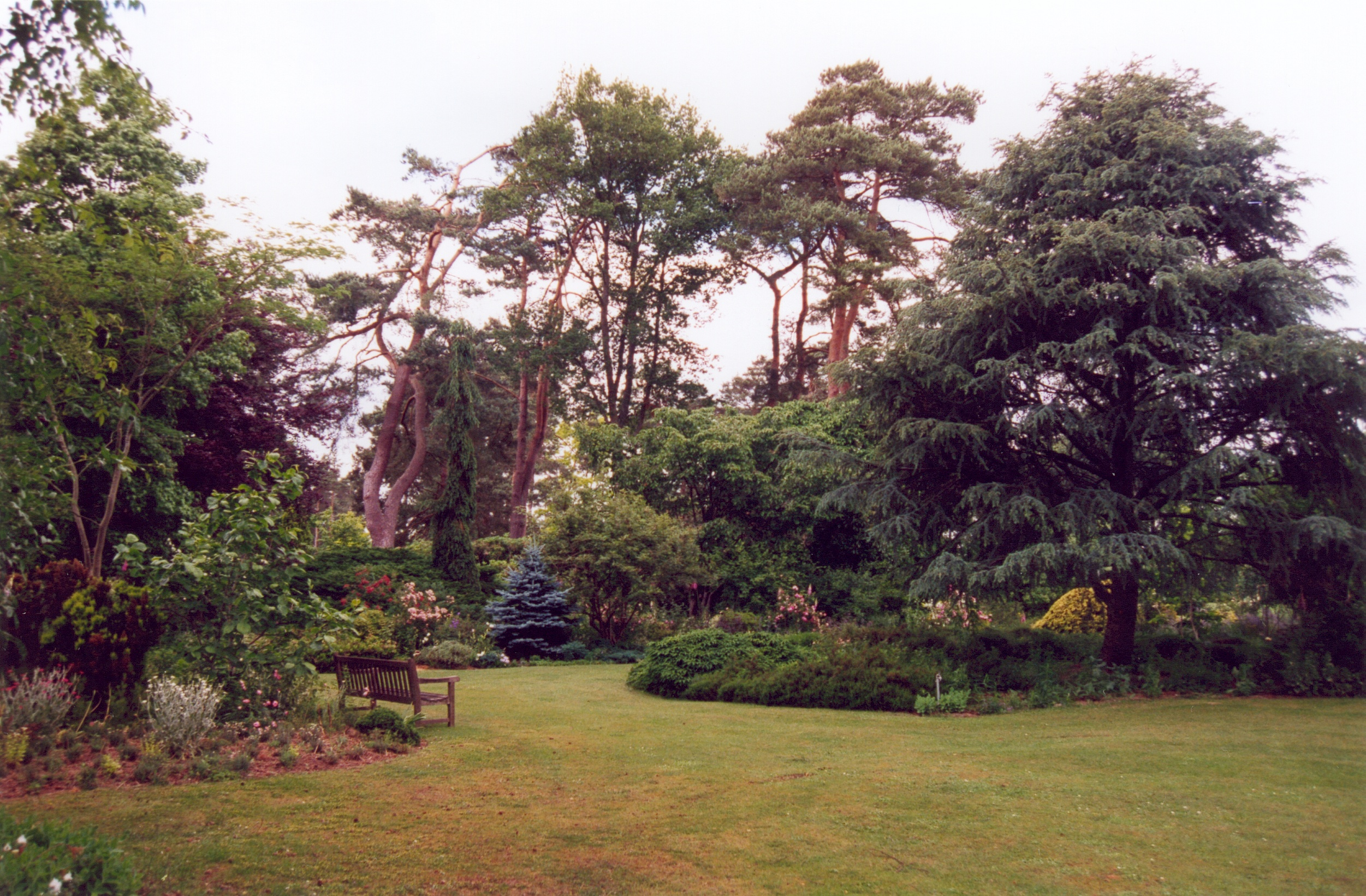
- The arboretum in Ingrannes

- Coat of arms
- Location of Ingrannes
- Location within France Location within Centre-Val de Loire
- Coordinates: 47°59′30″N 2°12′51″E
- Country: France
- Region: Centre-Val de Loire
- Department: Loiret
- Arrondissement: Orléans
- Canton: Châteauneuf-sur-Loire
- Intercommunality: CC des Loges

Government
  - Mayor (2020–2026): Éric Poilane
- Area^{1}: 38.98 km^{2} (15.05 sq mi)
- Highest elevation: 147 m (482 ft)
- Lowest elevation: 109 m (358 ft)
- Population (2023): 532
  - Density: 13.6/km^{2} (35.3/sq mi)
- Time zone: UTC+01:00 (CET)
  - Summer (DST): UTC+02:00 (CEST)
- INSEE/Postal code: 45168 /45450
- ^{1} French Land Register data, which excludes lakes, ponds, glaciers > 1 km^{2} (0.386 sq mi or 247 acres) and river estuaries.

Ingrannes (French pronunciation: [ɛ̃ɡʁan]) is a commune in the Loiret department in north-central France.

== Points of interest ==
- La Cour-Dieu Abbey
- Arboretum des Grandes Bruyères

== In literature ==
Georges Simenon's 1957 novel "The Premier", focusing on the character of a retired French Prime Minister, gives the background of the protagonist's loyal driver-valet: "Emile was born at Ingrannes, in the depths of the Forest of Orleans, in a family whose men had been gamekeepers, father to son, for longer than anyone could remember. He and his brothers had been brought up together with the dogs. But he made one think of a poacher rather than a gamekeeper. After being discharged from military service he had been accepted as a driver in the Ouai d'Orsai through the influence of his local Squire. "

== See also ==
- Communes of the Loiret department
