= Pithiviers =

- Subprefecture and commune
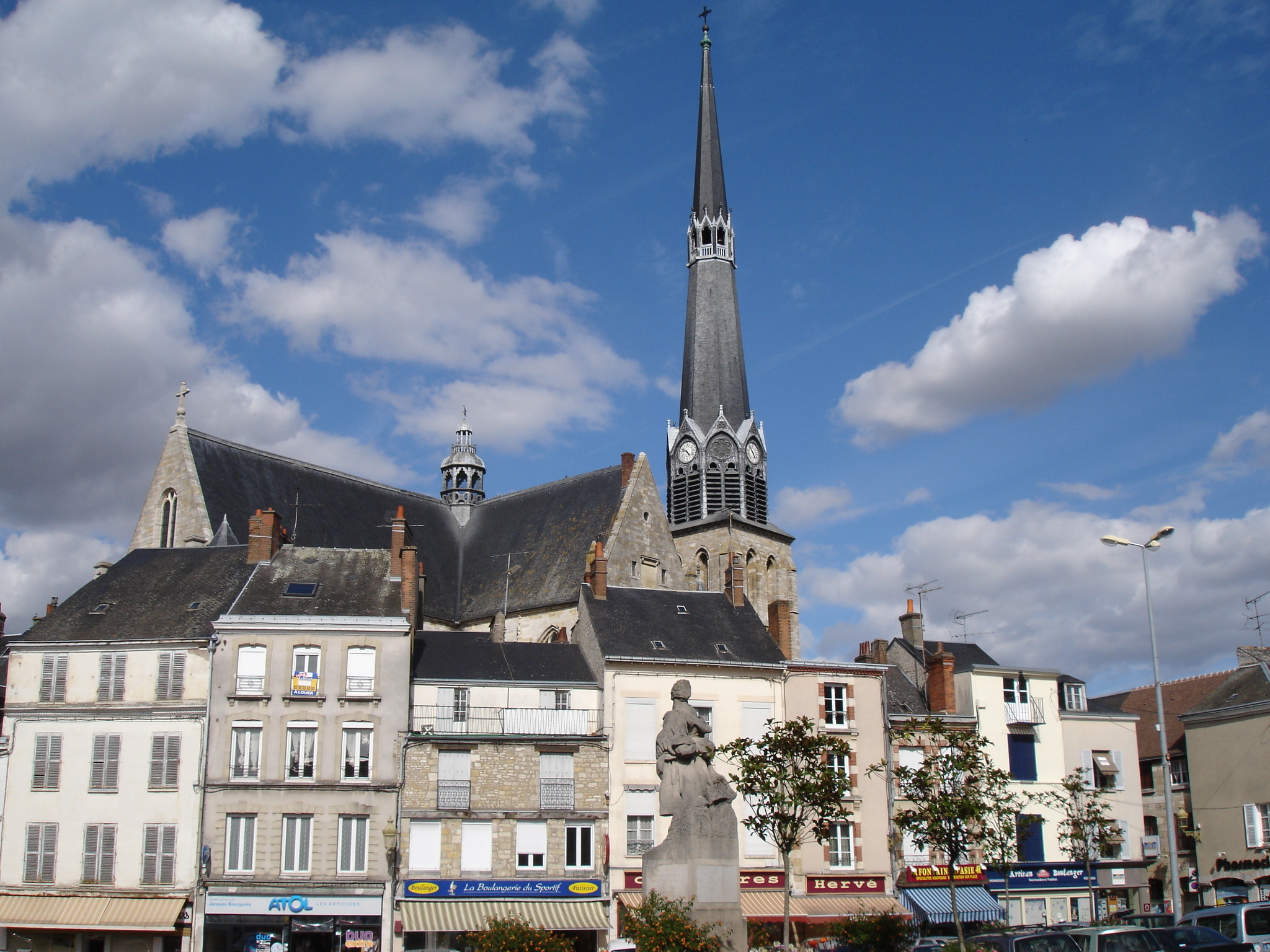
- The Place du Martroi, in Pithiviers

- Coat of arms
- Location of Pithiviers
- Location within France Location within Centre-Val de Loire
- Coordinates: 48°10′21″N 2°15′09″E
- Country: France
- Region: Centre-Val de Loire
- Department: Loiret
- Arrondissement: Pithiviers
- Canton: Pithiviers
- Intercommunality: Pithiverais

Government
  - Mayor (2020–2026): Philippe Nolland
- Area^{1}: 6.94 km^{2} (2.68 sq mi)
- Elevation: 120 m (390 ft)
- Highest elevation: 130 m (430 ft)
- Lowest elevation: 97 m (318 ft)
- Population (2023): 8,856
  - Density: 1,280/km^{2} (3,310/sq mi)
- Time zone: UTC+01:00 (CET)
  - Summer (DST): UTC+02:00 (CEST)
- INSEE/Postal code: 45252 /45300
- ^{1} French Land Register data, which excludes lakes, ponds, glaciers > 1 km^{2} (0.386 sq mi or 247 acres) and river estuaries.

Pithiviers (French pronunciation: [pitivje]) is a commune in the Loiret department, north central France. It is one of the subprefectures of Loiret. It is twinned with Ashby-de-la-Zouch in Leicestershire, England and Burglengenfeld in Bavaria, Germany.

Its attractions include a cinema, a theatre and a preserved steam railway.

During World War II, Pithiviers was the location of the infamous Pithiviers internment camp.

The pithivier, a kind of pie, is said to originate here in the middle ages. The traditional Pithivier was a small scalloped-edge sweet tartlet. Savoury versions can be filled with peacock, heron, swan or pork.

== Population ==
Historical population
| Year | Pop. | ±% p.a. |
|---|---|---|
| 1968 | 8,715 | — |
| 1975 | 10,097 | +2.13% |
| 1982 | 9,392 | −1.03% |
| 1990 | 9,327 | −0.09% |
| 1999 | 9,242 | −0.10% |
| 2007 | 8,779 | −0.64% |
| 2012 | 8,966 | +0.42% |
| 2017 | 8,981 | +0.03% |
| 2023 | 8,856 | −0.23% |
Source: INSEE

== Personalities ==
- Helvise of Pithiviers (965/970 - 1025) - related to the Counts of Blois family, she built the castle of Pithivers.
- Armenian monk Gregory of Nicopolis (also called Gregory Makar and Grégoire de Nicopolis) brought gingerbread to Europe from Pithiviers in the 10th century.
- Louis Lebègue Duportail - French military leader during the American Revolutionary War, born here in 1743.
- Siméon Poisson - mathematician born here in 1781 and died in 1840.
- Michel Odent (1930 - 2025) - French obstetrician, surgeon & childbirth specialist. World renowned for his work at Pithiviers Hospital & Midwifery (1962–1985) as well as his many publications supporting natural birth.
- Marie Ndiaye - novelist and playwright who was born here in 1967.
- Xavier Dectot - curator and art historian who was born here in 1973.
- Steve Marlet - former footballer who was born here in 1974.

== See also ==
- Communes of the Loiret department
- Tramway de Pithiviers à Toury
