= Abbaye Blanche =

Abbey in Manche, France

Coordinates: 48°39′29″N 0°56′42″W

Saint Adelina
- Died: 1125
- Venerated in: Catholic Church
- Canonized: Pre-congregation
- Feast: 20 October

The Abbaye Blanche ("White Abbey") was a nunnery founded in 1112 in Mortain, France.

Shortly after establishing an abbey for men called Holy Trinity of Savigny, Saint Vitalis, founder of the monastic order of Savigny, set up the Abbaye Blanche for women, with his sister Adelina as abbess. The nuns of the Abbaye Blanche wore habits of undyed wool and followed a very strict interpretation of the Rule of Saint Benedict.

The church is built on a Latin cross floorplan of a central nave and a wide transept. The style is Early Gothic, though unfortunately only the chapter house, cellar and Romanesque cloister remain in their original 12th-century form.

The communities of Holy Trinity and the Abbaye Blanche joined the Cistercian order in 1147, as did the other 30 or so houses of the Order of Savigny.

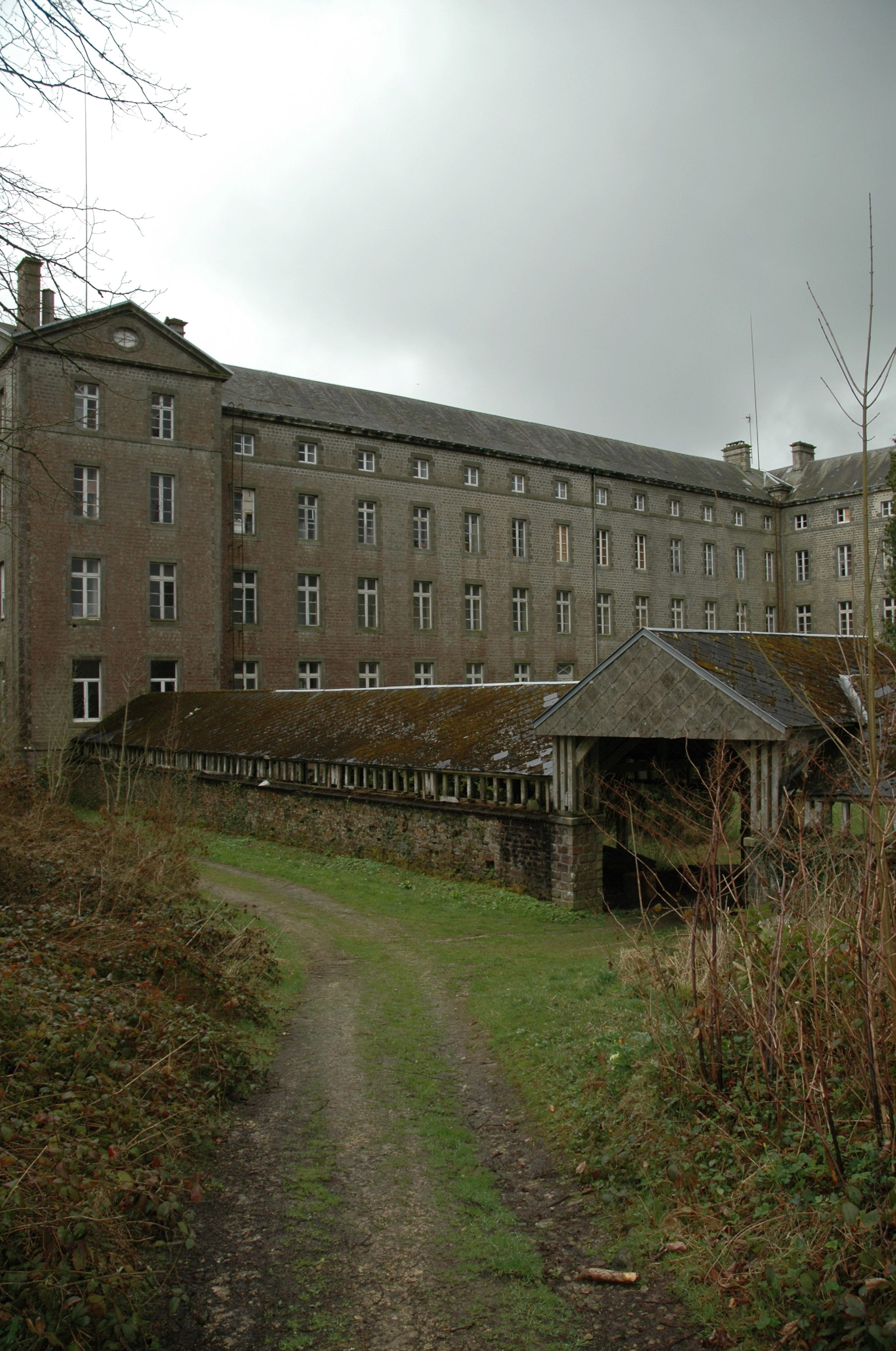
Abbaye Blanche

Saint Adelina (died 1125) was a French Benedictine nun honored as a saint by the Catholic Church. She was a noblewoman of Normandy, the sister of Saint Vitalis. She became the abbess of the Benedictine convent Abbaye Blanche in Normandy, a religious community founded by her brother. Her feast day is celebrated on October 20.
