= Vaux-de-Cernay Abbey =

Former Cistercian monastery in northern France

Coordinates: 48°41′2″N 1°56′10″E

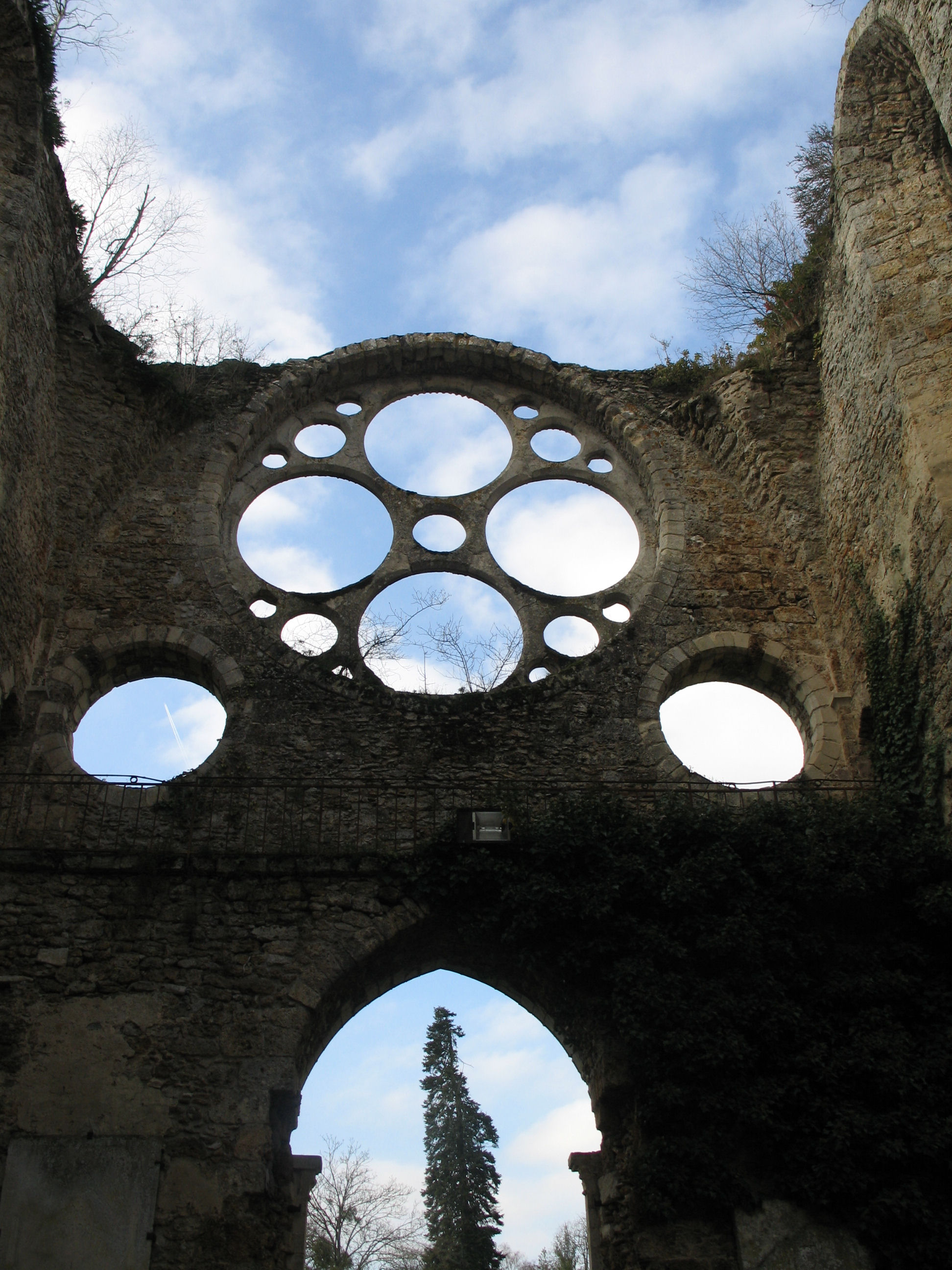
The ruined abbey church

Vaux-de-Cernay Abbey (French: Abbaye des Vaux-de-Cernay) is a former Cistercian monastery in northern France (Île-de-France), situated in Cernay-la-Ville, in the Diocese of Versailles, Yvelines. The abbey was abandoned during the French Revolution and fell into partial ruin. Most of the buildings, except for the church, were restored in the late 19th century by Charlotte de Rothschild, and the property is now a hotel.

== Abbey ==
The abbey was founded in 1118 when Simon de Neauffle and his wife Eve donated land to the monks of Savigny Abbey to endow a monastery in honour of the Virgin Mary and Saint John the Baptist. Vital, Abbot of Savigny accepted their gift and sent a group of monks under the direction of Arnaud, who became their first abbot. Besides the founders, others of the nobility came to the aid of the new Savigniac community.

As soon as the abbey was well established, many postulants were admitted, thus making possible in 1137 the foundation of Le Breuil-Benoît Abbey in the Diocese of Évreux. In 1148 Vaux-de-Cernay, together with the entire Congregation of Savigny, entered the Order of Cîteaux and became an affiliation of Clairvaux Abbey. From this time on they prospered, building a church in the simple Cistercian style. The tomb of Simon and his wife was placed in front of the altar of the abbey church, on the left. Over time, additional buildings were constructed, as well as a mill and a fish farm.

Many of its abbots became well known. Andrew, the fourth, died as Bishop of Arras. Guy of Vaux-de-Cernay, the sixth, was delegated by the General Chapter to accompany the Fourth Crusade in 1203. Three years later he was one of the principal figures in the Albigensian Crusade, which fought against the Cathars. In recognition of his service he was made Bishop of Carcassonne (1211) and is commemorated in the Cistercian Menology. His nephew Peter of Vaux-de-Cernay, also a monk of the abbey, accompanied him on this crusade, and left a chronicle of the Cathars and the war against them.

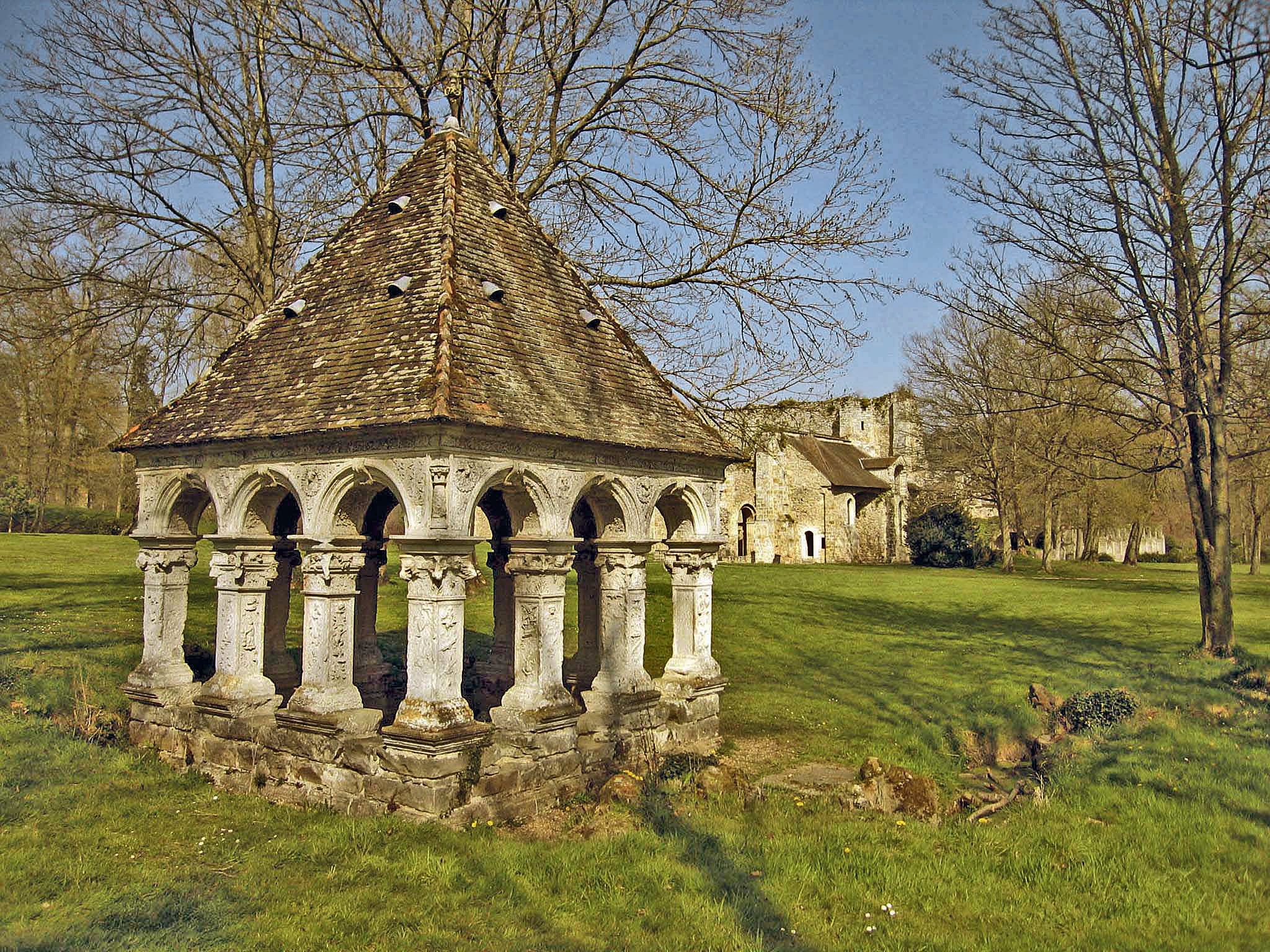
Abbey well

Under Thomas, Peter's successor, Porrois Abbey, a Cistercian nunnery later renamed the Abbey of Port-Royal, was founded and placed under the direction of the abbots of Vaux-de-Cernay. The ninth abbot, Theobald of Marly (1235–47), a descendant of the Montmorency family, was canonized in 1297. During his time as abbot, in 1240, King Louis IX (Saint Louis) visited the abbey on pilgrimage with his queen, Margaret of Provence, who had been unable to have children; the couple's eleven subsequent children were attributed to the water from the spring-fed well serving the abbey, which consequently became a place of pilgrimage.

Towards the end of the fourteenth century the monastery began losing its fervour, both on account of its wealth and because of the disturbed state of the Île-de-France during the Hundred Years' War. After the introduction of commendatory abbots in 1542 there was little left of the monastic community beyond the name. In the seventeenth century the community was restored in spirit by embracing the Reform of the Strict Observance as promoted by Denis Largentier. During this time the commendatory abbot was John Casimir, King of Poland.

The monastery was suppressed in 1791 during the French Revolution and its members (twelve priests) were dispersed. Much of the site subsequently fell into ruin.

== Recent history ==
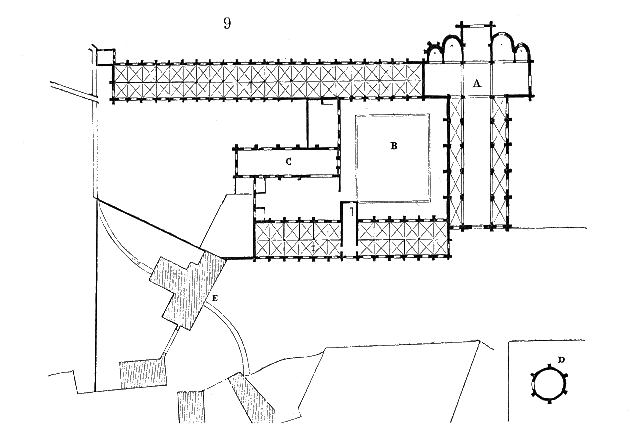
Ground plan

After passing through various hands, in the 1880s the abbey site was bought by Charlotte de Rothschild, who stabilized the ruins of the church and commissioned the Rothschild family architect Félix Langlais to restore the 17th-century abbey building with interiors emulating the chapterhouse, which had remained intact. She used it for a summer home, with stables for her thoroughbreds on the grounds. Her grandson Baron Henri de Rothschild inherited the property in 1903 and further updated the residence; it was the site of his experiments in child nutrition.

In November 1942, the property of Henri de Rothschild and his son James was expropriated under the antisemitic laws of Vichy France. Vaux-de-Cernay Abbey was sold at auction to the industrialist Félix Amiot, who moved his private offices there. The estate was also used as an agricultural centre. Amiot's heirs sold the property in 1988 and it became a hotel, with a capacity of 1,200 and a heliport, but still drawing its water from the original spring. It was classified as a historical monument in 1926 and fully protected in January 1994. The abbey mill, which appears in 19th-century landscape paintings, was sold in 2012 and in 2016 opened as a regional museum. In the early 2020s, the abbey was acquired by the hospitality company Paris Society and extensively renovated into a luxury hotel with interiors by Cordélia de Castellane.

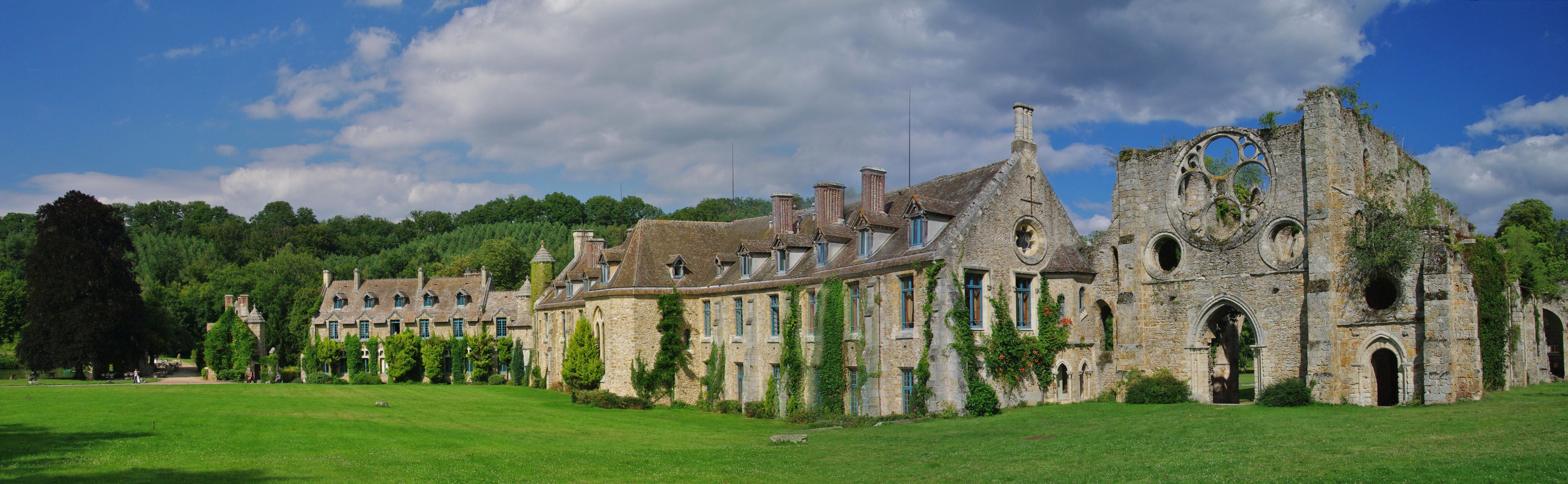
2008 view from the grounds

== See also ==
- Abbé Adam

== Sources ==
- Gallia Christiana, VII
- Caspar Jongelinus, Notitia Abbatiarum, O. Cisterciensis (Cologne, 1640)
- Bertrand Tissier, Bibliotheca Patrum Cisterciensium, VII (Paris, 1669)
- Merlet and Moutier, Cartulaire de l'Abbaye de N. D. des Vaux-de-Cernay, I-III (Paris, 1857–58)
- Morize, Étude archéologique sur l'Abbaye des Vaux-de-Cernay with introduction by de Dion (Tours, 1889)
- De Dion, Cartulaire de Porrois plus connue sous le nom mystique de Port-Royal (Paris, 1903)
- Charles Beaunier, Recueil historique des archévechés, évechés, abbayes et prieurés de France, province ecclesiastique de Paris (Paris, 1905)
- Angel Manrique, Annales Cistercienses (Lyons, 1642–59)
- Edmond Martène and Ursin Durand, Veterum Scriptorum et Monumentorum amplissima collectio, II (Paris, 1724)
- Petrus Sarniensis, Historia Albigensium (Troyes, 1615)
- Leopold Janauschek, Originum Cisterciensium, I (Vienna, 1877)
