= Mortuary roll =

Medieval document to commemorate prominent persons

A mortuary roll (Latin: rotulus mortuorum) was a rotulus composed in the scriptorium of a medieval Christian monastic community to commemorate the death of a prominent person associated with the institution.

== Function ==
Once a monk or nun had died, it was common to announce their death to other monastic communities or religious institutions and ask for their prayers. A special messenger, denominated a breviator, gerulus, rollifer, rotularius, tomiger, or other title, from the laity was hired to transmit these letters from one to another. Whereas in the case of common monks or nuns only a short obituary note known as mortary brief would be transmitted, in the case of the death of a prominent person such as an abbot or abbess or a major patron of the monastery a mortuary roll would be used.

This mortuary roll would consist in the beginning of just one parchment which consisted of an elegant obituary of the deceased in an opening section known as encyclical or cover letter, often beautifully illuminated. Every community the messenger passed was expected to pray for the soul and to write a memorial of some sorts on the role. This could include epitaphs or poems (e.g. the mortuary roll of Wifred II of Cerdanya included fourteen poems from the cathedral chapter of Liège and nine from the monastery of St Lawrence of Liège) or simply the formula "May the soul of [...] and the souls of all the faithful dead rest in peace. Amen". Both the mortuary announcement and the memorial entries were in Latin. Once the initial parchment was filled, another sheet of parchment would be sown on it and thus extending it. This section that contains the entries is also known tituli as the entire entry of a single community is referred to as titulus, the singular form of tituli in Latin.

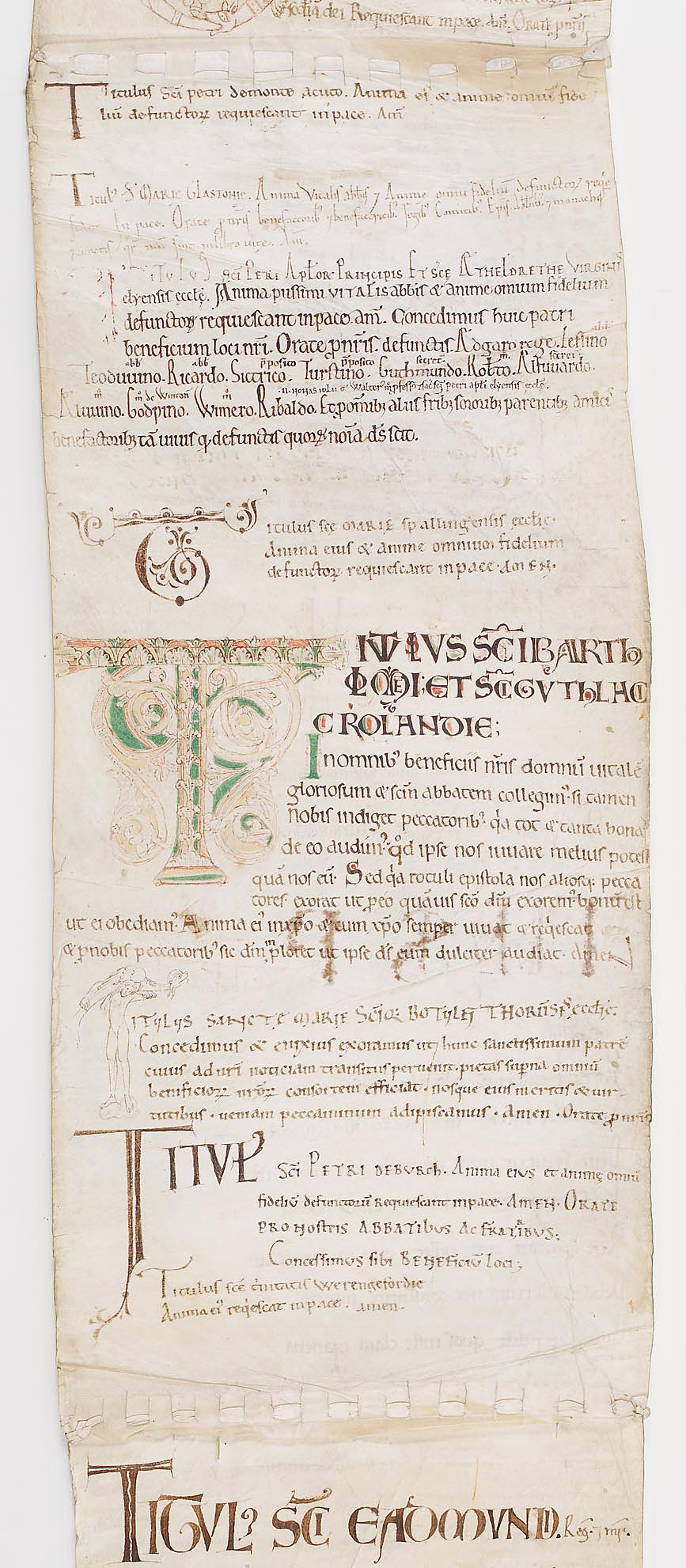
Mortuary roll of Vitalis of Savigny

Gradually a custom arose in many places of making these entries in verse with complementary amplifications that often occupied many lines. These records, some of which are still extant, memorialize specimens of ornate verse composition. They afford material both for palaeography and a comparative judgment of the standard of scholarship prevalent in the relevant centers of learning.

== History ==
The roots of this tradition have their beginnings in the 8th century when some monasteries started to send letters to other communities announcing the deaths of monks or nuns and asking for prayers for their souls. The earliest mortuary roll of which some fragments have survived are from Saint-Martial in Limoges and dates from the late 10th century. The circulation of these rolls seems to have taken place within France and Catalonia and then later spread to Belgium, Germany, Austria and England.

The practice of making and circulating mortuary rolls seems to have become unpopular by the late 14th century, possibly due to the disruption of monastic and public life at the time of the Black Death. One of the last mortuary rolls is that of John Islip, abbot of Westminster, whose roll is of particular interest as it seems to have been decorated by Hans Holbein the Younger.

== Examples ==
The use of mortuary rolls flourished most in the 11th, 12th, and 13th centuries. That of the Abbess Matilda of the Abbey of the Holy Trinity in Caen is the longest to have survived with a length of 72 feeds and width of 8-10 inches, having circulated among 253 religious institutions.

One of the best preserved roll is that of Vitalis of Savigny dating from 1122/23 (see image on the right). The roll is more than nine meters long and contains 208 tituli although some may have been lost, along with its cover letter. The extraordinary circulation of this role in Northern France and England, during which various members of monastic communities, collegiate churches and cathedral chapters subscribed, contributed substantially to the short-lived Order of Savigny.

== Sources ==
- Block Friedman, John; Mossler Figg, Kristen (2017). Routledge Revivals: Trade, Travel and Exploration in the Middle Ages (2000): An Encyclopedia. Taylor & Francis. ISBN 9781351661324.
- Shopkow, Leah (2021). Saint and the Count: A Case Study for Reading like a Historian. University of Toronto Press. ISBN 9781487525866.
