= Theobald of Marly =

French abbot and saint

Saint Theobald
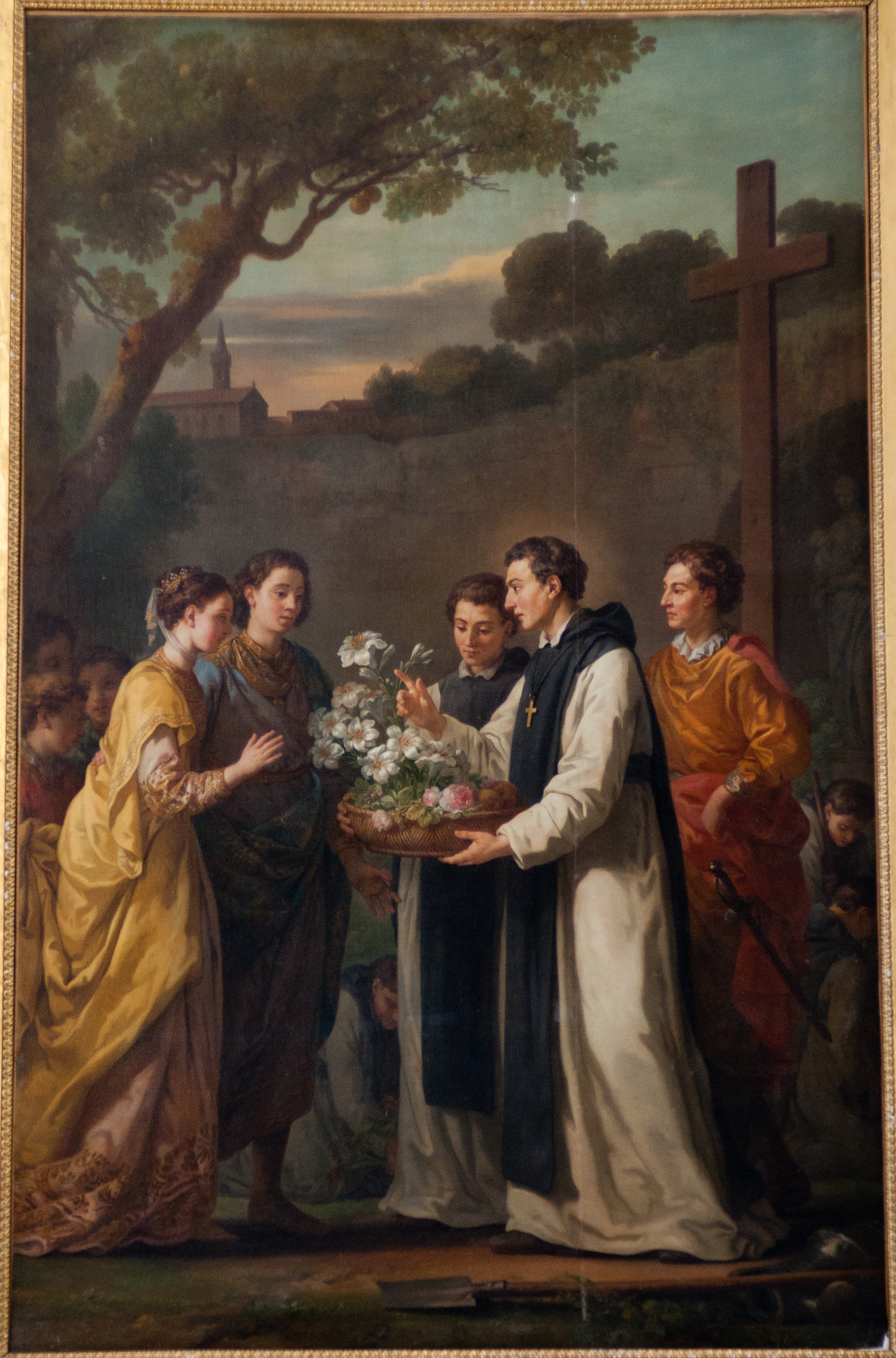

Abbot
- Born: c. 1200; Marly-la-Ville, Montmorency
- Died: 1247 (aged 46–47); Monastery of Vaux-de-Cernay
- Venerated in: Roman Catholic Church
- Major shrine: Vaux-de-Cernay
- Feast: July 27
- Attributes: Knight bearing the arms of Thann; sometimes depicted wearing armor under his Cistercian habit with his miter at his feet

Theobald of Marly (French: Saint Thibaut, Thibault, Thiébaut; c. 1200 – 8 December 1247) was a French abbot and saint. He was born at the castle of Marly, Montmorency, and was trained as a knight. He served as a knight at the court of Philip Augustus, though he later entered the Cistercian monastery of Vaux-de-Cernay in 1220. He was elected prior in 1230 and ninth abbot in 1235.

== Early life ==
Theobald was the son of crusader Bouchard de Marly, a member of the Montmorency family, and Mathilde de Châteaufort (granddaughter of Louis VI). He was born circa 1200 CE at the Château de Marly. As was the custom at the time for the son of a nobleman, he received a military education but in a Christian environment. During his youth, he showed a spiritual and religious nature. He spent much of his time in prayer, and was often to be found in the church of the sisters in Port Royal, which had been founded in 1204 by the wife of Matthew de Montmorency.

His family was a benefactor of both the Vaux-de-Cernay and Port Royal monasteries, and close to the court of Philip II of France. Bouchard had given the monastery such great wealth and property that he was considered its "second founder". Theobald became a knight at the court of Philip.

== Religious life ==
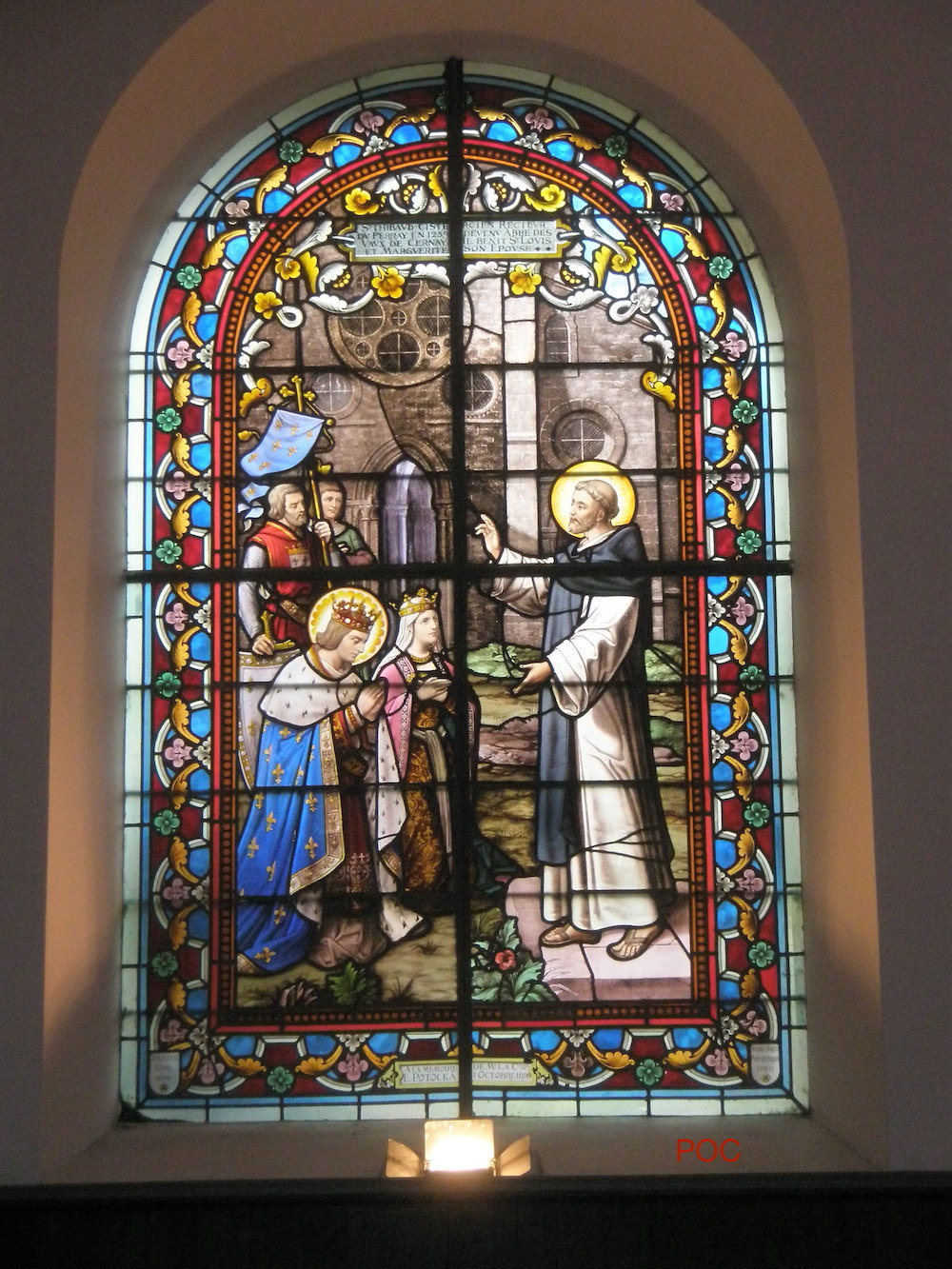
Saint Thibaut de Marly, in the church in Perrayy-en-Yvelines, France

Around 1220, Theobald discussed entering the religious life with Thomas, the abbot of Vaux-de-Cernay. Thomas advised him to think about his desire for religious life as a Cistercian, as it would be more austere than the life led before. In 1226, he joined the abbey, where he was elected prior in 1230 and ninth abbot in 1235.

During his tenure as abbot he oversaw the repair and expanded the abbey, including the maintenance of existing buildings, and grew the number of monks. Following the Cistercian model of adhering to the Rule of Saint Benedict, he dressed in a simple if not threadbare fashion. He lived in the midst of the community as an ordinary fellow-brother, surpassing everyone in his love of poverty, silence and prayer. He held an intense devotion to Mary.

As he was an effective administrator, William of Auvergne, the Bishop of Paris asked Theobald to manage the affairs of the Abbey of Port-Royal-des-Champs. In 1236 he began to oversee the Abbey of Joie-lès-Nemours, and in 1237 the Abbey of Trésor Notre-Dame in Vexin. He also directed the men's Le Breuil-Benoît Abbey near Évreux.

His reputation grew and king Louis IX asked Theobald to pray for the fertility of him and his wife Margaret. Theobald directed them to drink water from the abbey's fountain. In July 1240, the queen gave birth to their first daughter, and ten other siblings. The grateful king and queen endowed the Vaux-de-Cernay abbey.

== Death and canonization ==
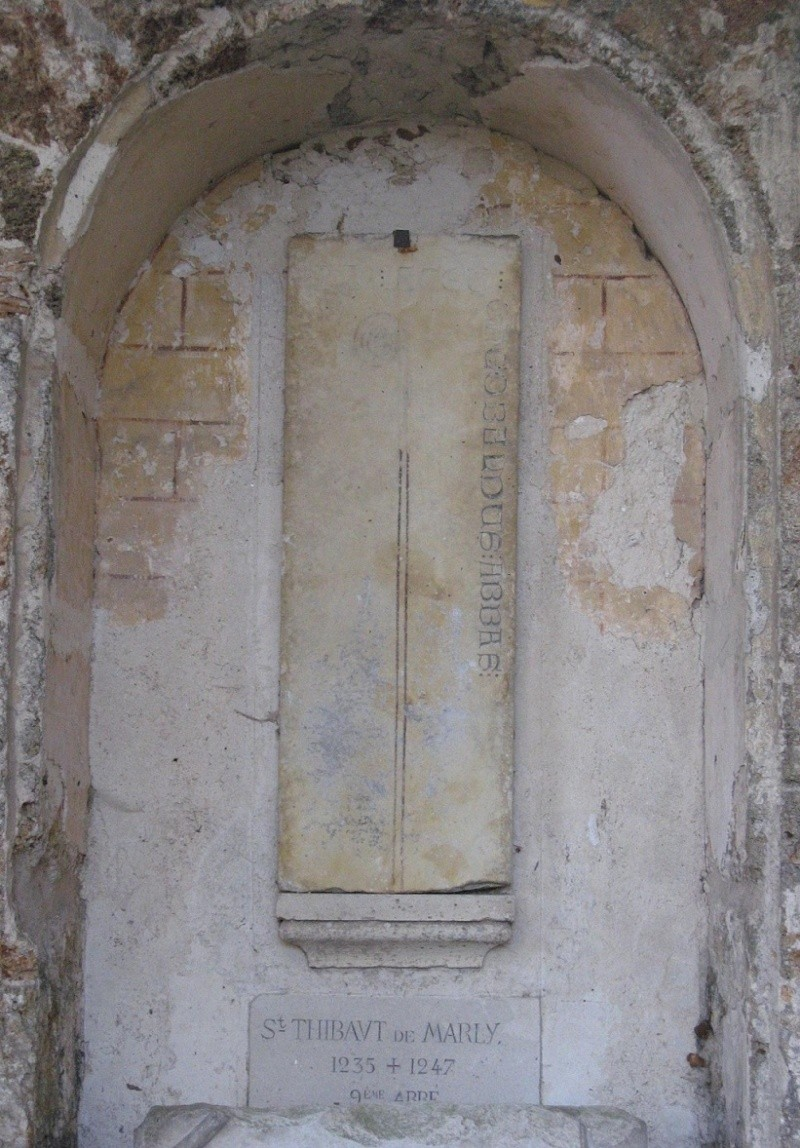
Funerary slab of Saint Thibaut de Marly in the abbey church of Les Vaux-de-Cernay (Yvelines, France)

After a long illness, he died on 7 December 1247 at Vaux-de-Cernay, and was buried in the chapter house with his predecessors. Placed on his tomb was a simple slab decorated with a crozier and a short Latin inscription: "Hic jacet Theobaldus abbas" (Here lies Abbot Thibauld).

After his death, his tomb became a pilgrimage site. Among the pilgrims were then queen Margaret of Provence with her son Philip. As they could not enter the chapter room to see the tomb of the saint, his remains were transferred in 1270 to the abbey church.

He was canonized in 1297. On 29 September 1710, his cult was officially recognized and approved by Pope Clement XI.

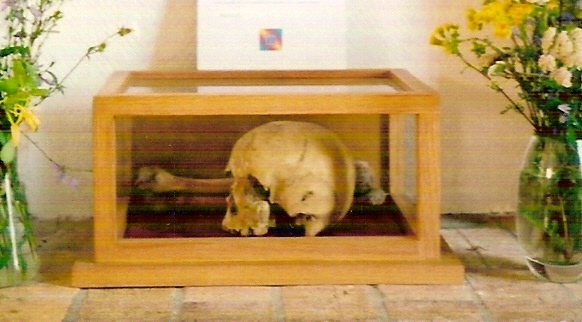
Relics of Saint Theobald in Sainte-Marie Chapel

During the French Revolution, the abbey was destroyed and Theobald's relics were burned, with the exception of his skull which is preserved in the Sainte-Marie Chapel of the Church of Saint-Brice of Cernay-la-Ville. He is venerated in Thann and Hemel Hempstead.
