= Stephen de Fougères =

- Bishop of Rennes
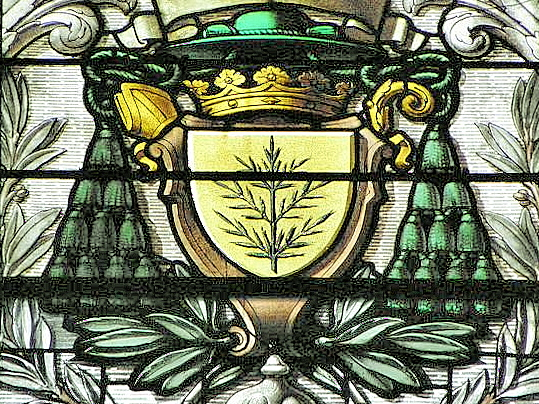
- Supposed arms of Bishop Stephen de Fougères
- Predecessor: Robert
- Successor: Philip

Orders
- Consecration: December 1168

Personal details
- Died: 23 December 1178

Stephen de Fougères (died 23 December 1178) household clerk to Henry II, king of England, author and bishop of Rennes.

== Career ==
Stephen first appears in the retinue of the young King Henry II during his period of residence in England from 1155 to 1163. Stephen has been identified as the scribe of several charters of the king issued during those years. There is little other evidence of his time at the Angevin court or his background, though it is assumed that his surname alludes to his place of origin in eastern Brittany, and not his membership of the noble family of that name. He gained the king's notice and in January 1168 he was consecrated to the see of Rennes in his native Brittany. Robert de Torigny, abbot of Mont St Michel and historian, preserved a very favourable notice of him, commemorating him as a cleric who 'had written to public acclaim many a song in verse and agreeable works in prose', which indicates he owed much of his rise and fame to his pen.

== Works ==
Stephen has been identified as the author of a number of Latin works as well as the French language Livre des manières, for which he is principally known. These include Latin lives of St Vitalis of Savigny and St Firmatus, both saints associated with the abbey of Savigny in western Normandy. He is also credited with a tract on the cathedral of Reims.

== Le Livre des Manières ==
Stephen's 'Book of Manners' is the work for which he is now chiefly famous. It is a long poem in Middle French verse of 1,345 lines in stanzas of four octosyllabic mono-rhymed lines. It is an oddity in terms of genre. It is a series of moralistic sketches addressed to generic figures: from popes, archbishops and kings to merchants, peasants and women, detailing what was unacceptable conduct in each and what each should ideally aspire to. It is possible that the Livre was in origin a series of French summaries of Latin sermons Stephen had preached or prepared, composed in the vernacular for wider circulation, the sort of sermon called 'Ad Status', addressed to different conditions of people. An older interpretation of it is as an early example of an 'estates satire', though it lacks the bitterness and negativity that goes with the genre. It is variously dated by commentators to different periods in his career. However it has been noted that in the colophon to the poem in which the author identifies himself and asks for readers' prayers, it is as 'Master Stephen de Fougères', which is not a title he would have used as a bishop. Similarly the dedication of the work to the widowed Cecilia, countess of Hereford, indicates the period when Stephen was a royal clerk resident in England, before 1163. Its apparent quotation of the Policraticus of Stephen's fellow courtier, John of Salisbury, would date it to after 1159. The work has attracted attention for several reasons. Historians of feudal society see it as a text associated with The Three Orders theory of medieval society. More recently its deep misogyny and Stephen's highly coloured evocation of lesbian intercourse has interested historians of gender and sexuality.

== Bibliography ==
- Le livre des manières, ed. R. Anthony Lodge (Geneva: Droz, 1979).
- Le livre des manières, ed. J.T.E. Thomas (Louvain: Peeters, 2013).
- J-C. Payen, 'Étienne de Fougères' in, Dictionnaire des lettres françaises: le Moyen Âge, ed. G. Hasenohr et M. Zink (Paris: Fayard, 1992), pp. 420–421
