= Dreux Wine-growers and Craftsmen Ecomuseum =

Coordinates: 48.7348°N 1.3600°E

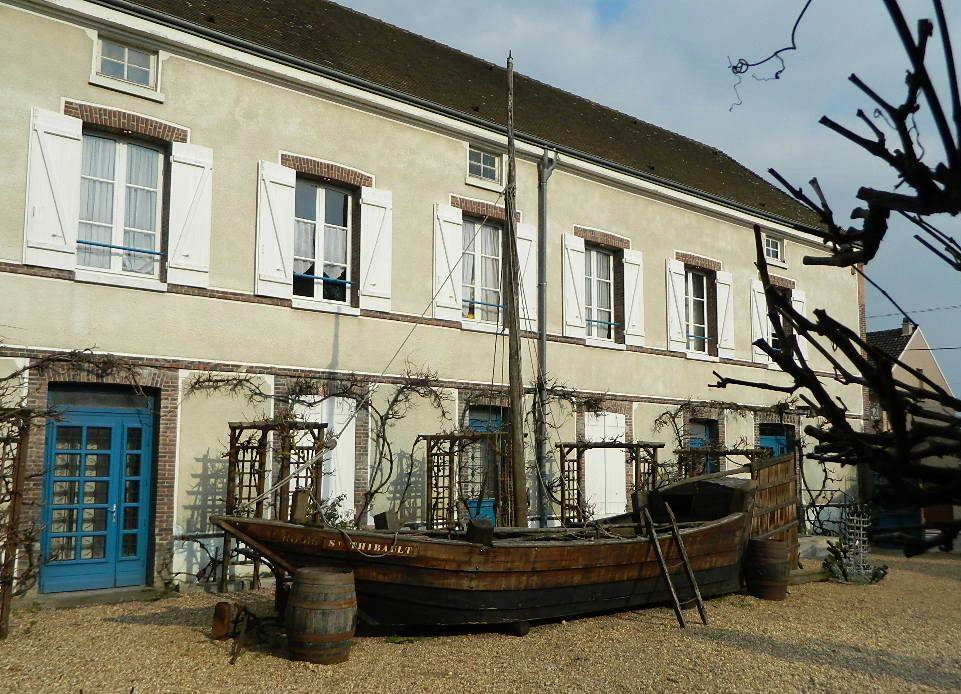
Boat in courtyard of Dreux Wine-growers and Craftsmen Ecomuseum.

Dreux Wine-growers and Craftsmen Ecomuseum is located in Dreux, on the previous site of Saint-Thibault priory. The museum was founded in 1987 by the cultural association Flora Gallica. It features 12th-century vaulted wine cellars, collections dedicated to wine-growing and local crafts as well as a medieval garden.

== Site history ==
In the 12th century, Earl of Dreux Robert the First asked the Cistercian monks of Le Breuil-Benoît Abbey (located in Marcilly-sur-Eure) to found a Conventual priory in Dreux at the foot of his castle (situated where the current day Chapelle royale is) in order to grow wine. In the Middle Ages, 250 hectares were dedicated to wine-growing in Dreux and 7,249 in the county (department) of Eure-et-Loir (currently less than a hectare). The Earl of Dreux owned six grape presses, one of which operated at the priory. In the 12th century, a harbour was built on the Blaise river: ships used the (connecting) Eure river to transport wine and other goods to Rouen, Paris or England. The monks dug rib-vaulted cellars into the flint and chalky marl; they were reinforced with double arches based on stone corbels. They used special pickaxes whose notches can still be seen. The cellars were used to store tithe wine, and had side chambers which inhabitants used to take shelter in case of attack.

Dreux was a stop-over on the way to Compostela: rolled maps deposited/put in the holes of the vaults' arch supports were available to the pilgrims. Some pilgrims would take small pieces of rock from the walls as a souvenir of their stay. One of the cellars seems to have been dug into the chalky cliff to house the press.

The monks collected the tithe on wine-growing products until the French Revolution. In 1791, the priory was sold as a bien national (national property) and transformed into a rural inn. The chapel was razed in 1852. The ecomuseum set up a vineyard again in 1989 and organises a grape-harvest celebration in October.

== Museum ==
In the courtyard, a life-size reproduction of a 13th-century flat-bottomed boat was built by volunteers. This kind of boat could be towed when the river wasn't deep enough. The door of the king's tax collector's house (set on fire by wine-growers in 1789) can also be seen, as well as a 7,150 litres (1,570 imp gal; 1,890 US gal) cask, a cart and presses. An outbuilding has a display of a 19th-century habitat with a stable, a bakery, a laundry room and two living areas. Various collections can be seen inside.

The ground floor section is dedicated to wine-growing tools and to vineyard work. The stained-glass windows that are exhibited here reproduce those of Chartres Cathedral, which represent, among other occupations, those of wine traders, coopers and wine-growers. A 17th-century wood and plaster statue called "Our Lady of the Bunch" can be seen. The first bunch of grapes was set in its hand for luck. Initially placed in a street of the town, it was sold to a Parisian second-hand goods dealer. Flora Gallica bought it thanks to a contribution.

On the first floor, ancient bathroom linen and toiletries (curling iron, laces), wine watercolours and clockmaker tools are displayed.

The "craftsmen's attic" houses various spaces showing the traditional trades and their tools (clog maker, saddler, blacksmith, potter etc.) Another room houses a restored apothecary.

== Medieval garden ==
In the Middle Ages, the Saint-Thibault priory owned a garden cultivated according to Hildegard of Bingen's rules. The ecomuseum has recreated a medieval garden on a 600 square metres (6,500 sq ft) plot on the hill with ancient plants which had been used for aromatic, textile and medicinal purposes.
