= Congregation of Savigny =

Monastic order in Normandy, France

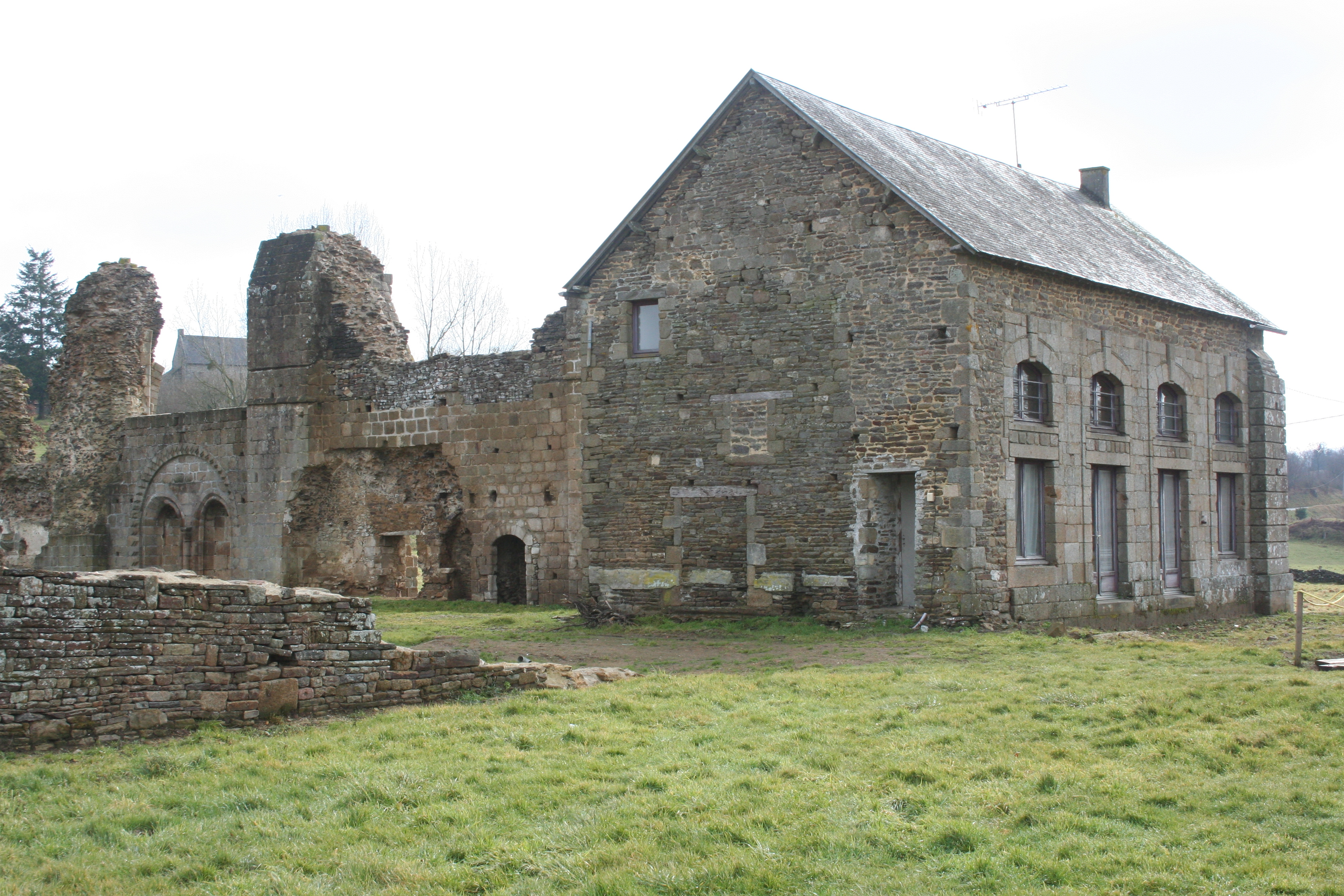
Savigny Abbey

The monastic Congregation of Savigny (Savigniac Order) started in the abbey of Savigny, situated in northern France, on the confines of Normandy and Brittany, in the Diocese of Coutances. It originated in 1105 when Vitalis of Mortain established a hermitage in the forest at Savigny in France.

== Founding ==
Vitalis was a canon of the Collegiate Church of St. Evroul in Mortain. He resigned his prebend to embrace an eremitical life under Robert of Arbrissel in the forest of Craon, located in Anjou. Leaving the latter, he retired to the forest of Savigny, where he built his own hermitage.

The number of disciples who then gathered around him necessitated the construction of adequate buildings, in which was instituted the monastic life, following the Rule of St. Benedict, interpreted in a manner similar to the Cistercians. The community wore grey habits. In 1112, the local lord, Rudolph of Fougeres, confirmed to the monastery the grants he had formerly made to Abbot Vitalis, and from then dates the foundation of the monastery. Once firmly established, its growth was rapid, and it soon became one of the most celebrated in France. Aimo of Landecob was a noted member.

== Expansion ==
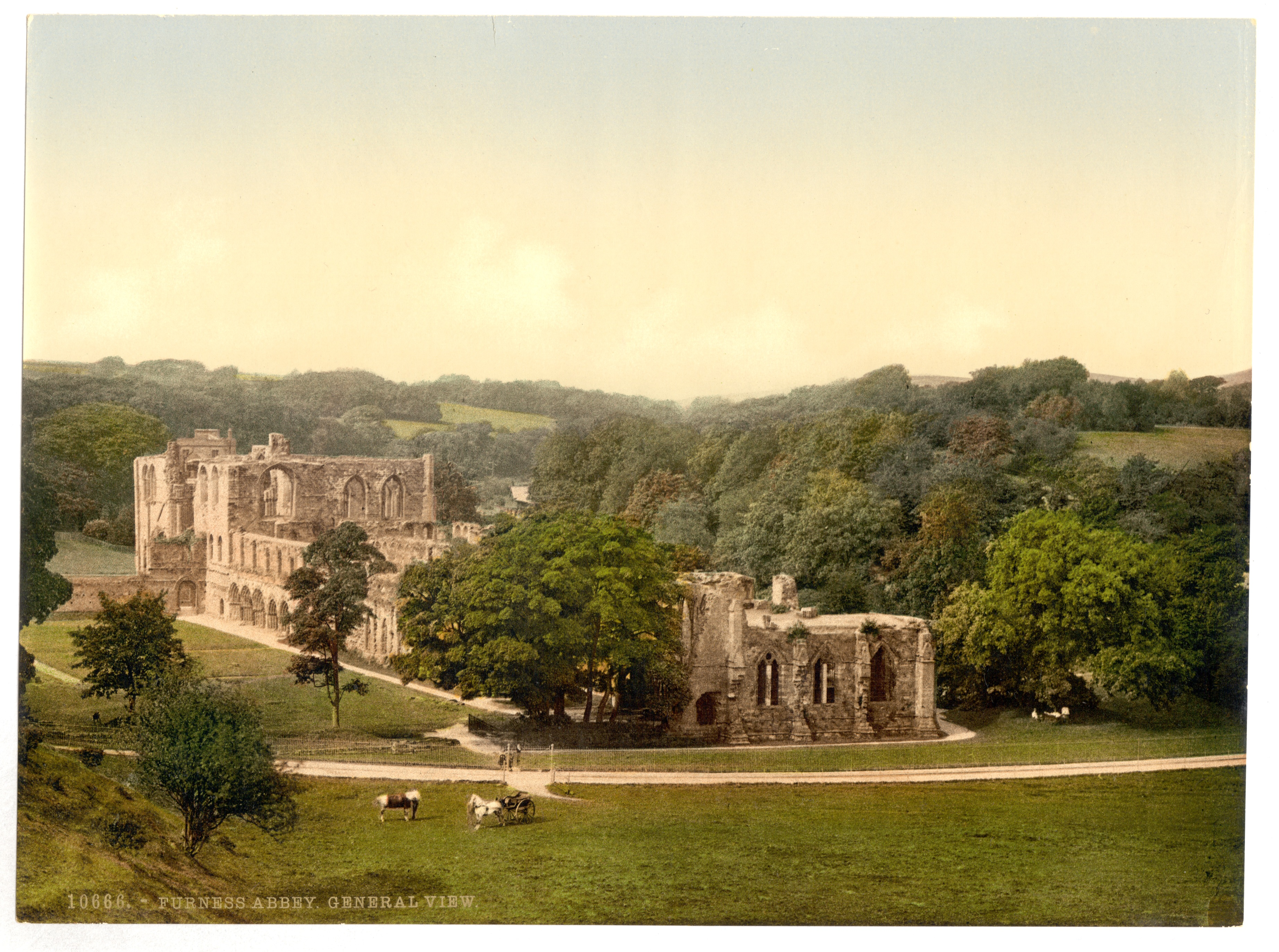
Furness Abbey, England

The Congregation founded daughter-houses such as that at Furness Abbey and Calder Abbey, both in Cumbria, England. In 1119, Pope Celestine II, then in Angers, took it under his immediate protection, and strongly commended it to the neighbouring nobles.

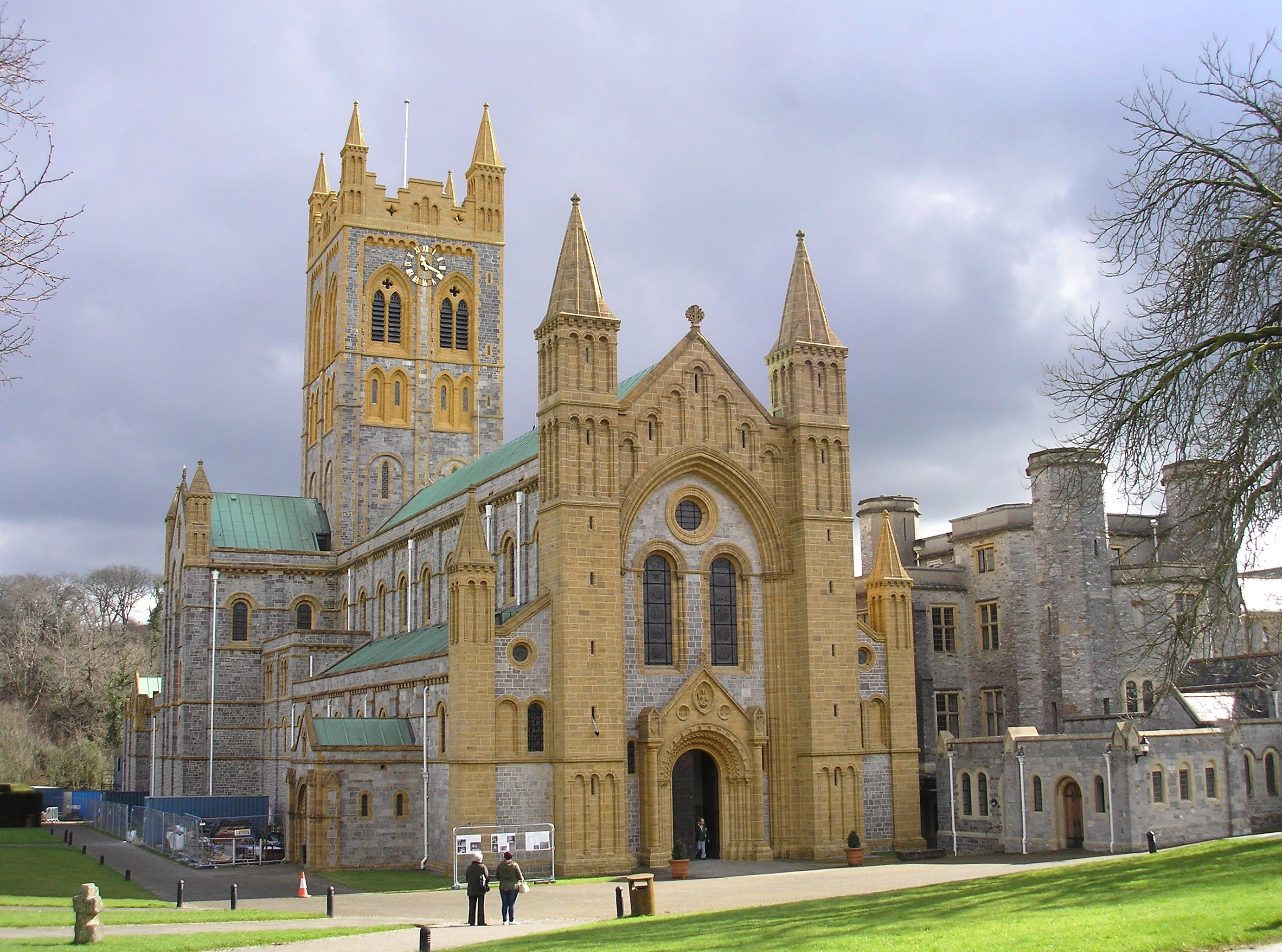
Buckfast Abbey, 2013

Under Geoffroy, successor to Vitalis, Henry I of England, established and generously endowed twenty-nine monasteries of this Congregation in his dominions. Early in the 12th century, Buckfast Abbey was incorporated into the Benedictine Congregation of Savigny. The monasteries of Basingwerk (Flintshire) and Neath (Glamorgan) in Wales were founded as Savigniac houses, as was Combermere Abbey. St. Mary's Abbey, Dublin was founded as a Benedictine house in 862, and given to the Congregation of Savigny in 1139. From the number of its foundations Savigny became the head of a Congregation, numbering thirty-three subordinate houses, within thirty years of its own inception.

Saint Bernard of Cîteaux also held them in high esteem, and it was at his request that their monks, in the troubled times of the Antipope Anacletus II, declared in favour of Pope Innocent II.

== Administrative merger with the Cistercians ==
By 1147, the Order was experiencing financial and administrative difficulties. Abbot Serlo, third successor of the founder, found it difficult to retain his jurisdiction over the English monasteries, who wished to make themselves independent. He determined to affiliate the entire Congregation to Cîteaux, which was effected at the General Chapter of 1147. Several English monasteries objecting to this, were finally obliged to submit by Pope Eugene III (1148). Each of the newly affiliated houses was surveyed, and brought within conformity of the strictures and standards of the Cistercian order.

== Later history ==
The Savigny Abbey continued to exist until the Revolution reduced it to a heap of ruins, and scattered its then existing members. Of all its former dependencies only La Grande Trappe, a daughter of Le Breuil-Benoît Abbey, which was a direct foundation of Savigny, remains.

== Saints ==
- Vitalis of Savigny
- Godfrey of Amiens
- Aimo of Savigny
