= Abbé Adam =

French priest

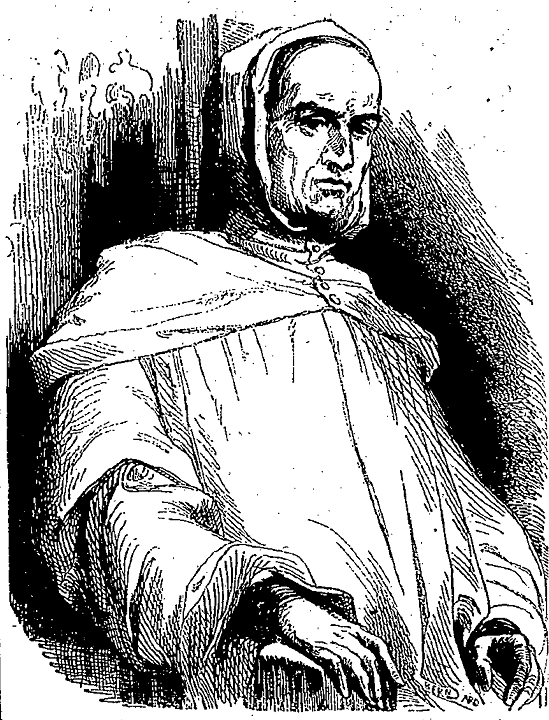
Abbot Adam as depicted in Collin de Plancy's Dictionnaire Infernal, 1863 edition

L'Abbé Adam was a French priest. He was abbot of Vaux de Cernay, and probably lived in the early 14th century. Although a real person, he became famous for his supposed exploits in driving off the Devil.

According to legend, whilst travelling with a servant to an outlying part of the abbey's estates, Adam was plagued by the Devil. First of all the Devil appeared as a tree white with frost, and then rushed towards the abbot incredibly fast. The abbot, however, merely made the sign of the cross and the tree disappeared. Realising that he had been attacked by the Devil, the priest called on the Virgin Mary to protect him. Nevertheless, the Devil reappeared, this time in the guise of a ferocious black knight, but was again driven off. Appearing a third time, as a tall man with a long, thin neck, Adam this time struck him with his fist, whereupon the figure changed into a little cloaked monk with a sword and glittering eyes under his cowl. He tried to strike Adam, but was again met with the sign of the cross. He turned into a pig and then an ass. The Abbé made a circle on the ground with a cross in the centre and the Devil withdrew, changing his ass's ears into horns. Offended by Adam's words to him, he then changed into a barrel and rolled into a nearby field, returning shortly in the form of a cartwheel and rolling over the monk's body without doing him any injury whatsoever. Giving up, he then disappeared and the Abbé continued his journey in peace.
