= Saint Aimo =

French Roman Catholic saint

- Born: Rennes, France
- Died: 1173
- Venerated in: Roman Catholic Church
- Canonized: Pre-congregation
- Feast: 30 April

Aimo (commonly known as Saint Aimo, also Aymon or Hamon) was a mystic and monk.

Born in the village of Landecob, Brittany near Rennes, Aimo entered the Benedictine monastery of Savigny, in Savigny, Normandy. Suspected of having leprosy, he was ejected from the house lest the sickness spread. Aimo went to stay in a nearby woods with two other monks who did have the disease. There he took care of them.

When it was seen that he did not have leprosy, Aimo was allowed to become a professed monk and was ordained a priest. He became known as an effective confessor and spiritual director. He was entrusted with supervising the lay brothers, who were as much servants as monks, many with little religious sensibility; but he loved them and many learned spirituality from him.

His devotion to the saints led to the building of a number of churches and chapels in Normandy in their honor. Aimo is mainly remembered for charitable kindness especially to the sick and for his mystical experiences.
