= Sourdeval =

- Commune
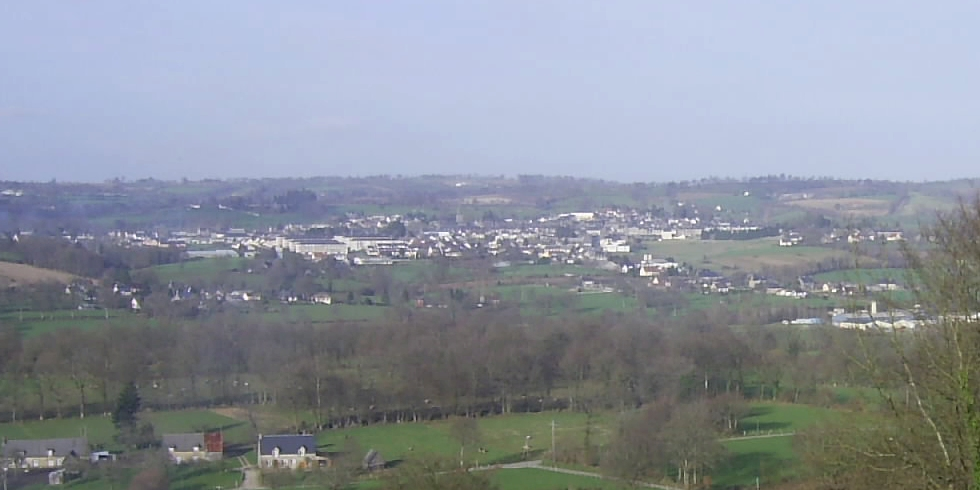
- Location of Sourdeval
- Location within France Location within Normandy
- Coordinates: 48°43′26″N 0°55′11″W
- Country: France
- Region: Normandy
- Department: Manche
- Arrondissement: Avranches
- Canton: Le Mortainais
- Intercommunality: CA Mont-Saint-Michel-Normandie

Government
  - Mayor (2023–2026): Adrien Jehenne
- Area^{1}: 51.87 km^{2} (20.03 sq mi)
- Elevation: 220 m (720 ft)
- Highest elevation: 354 m (1,161 ft)
- Lowest elevation: 155 m (509 ft)
- Population (2023): 3,026
  - Density: 58.34/km^{2} (151.1/sq mi)
- Demonym: Sourdevalais
- Time zone: UTC+01:00 (CET)
  - Summer (DST): UTC+02:00 (CEST)
- INSEE/Postal code: 50582 /50150
- Website: sourdeval.fr
- ^{1} French Land Register data, which excludes lakes, ponds, glaciers > 1 km^{2} (0.386 sq mi or 247 acres) and river estuaries.

Sourdeval (French pronunciation: [suʁdəval]) is a commune in the Manche department in Normandy in north-western France. On 1 January 2016, the former commune of Vengeons was merged into Sourdeval.

== Geography ==
The commune is made up of the following collection of villages and hamlets, Vengeons, La Fourberie, Loraire, Sourdeval, La Besnardière, La Moinerie, La Barre and La Richardière.

The source of the river Sée is in this commune. In addition the river Égrenne flows through the commune.

== Population ==
Population data refer to the area corresponding with the commune as of January 2025.

Historical population
Year	Pop.	±% p.a.
1968	4,155	—
1975	4,234	+0.27%
1982	4,154	−0.27%
1990	3,763	−1.23%
1999	3,556	−0.63%
2007	3,378	−0.64%
2012	3,151	−1.38%
2017	3,173	+0.14%
2023	3,026	−0.79%
Source: INSEE

== Heraldry ==
Arms of Sourdeval	The arms of Sourdeval are blazoned : Or fretty sable, a canton of the second.

== Twin towns – sister cities ==
Sourdeval is twinned with:

- Uchte, Germany since 1992
- Odiham, England since 1993

== See also ==
- Communes of the Manche department
