= Vitalis of Savigny =

French catholic saint and preacher (1060–1122)

Saint Vitalis of Savigny
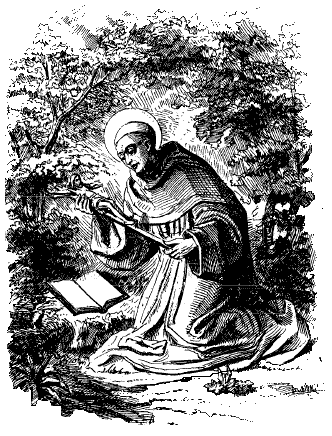

Abbot of Savigny Abbey
- Born: c. 1060; Tierceville, Duchy of Normandy
- Died: 1122 (aged 61–62); Savigny Abbey, Savigny, Duchy of Normandy
- Venerated in: Catholic Church
- Canonized: 1738
- Feast: 16 September

Vitalis of Savigny (c. 1060 – 16 September 1122) was the canonized founder of Savigny Abbey in Manche and of the Congregation of Savigny (1112).

== Biography ==
=== Early life and work as chaplain ===
He was born in Normandy at Tierceville near Bayeux about 1060–65 in a family not belonging to the nobility. His parents were Regefredus (Rainfredus) and Rohardis (Rohes) and he had at least one sister, Adeline, and a brother called Osbert who later also became a monk. Nothing is known of his early years; it is possible that he first went to the Benedictine monastery of Grestain, the family monastery of the local noble family of Conteville, before possibly studying in Bayeux or Liège. After ordination he pursued advanced studies before becoming chaplain to Duke William the Conqueror's brother, Robert of Mortain (died 1090).

The Vita (biography) of Vitalis tells that Robert was beating his wife, but Vitalis intervened and threatened to end the marriage if Robert did not repent. In another entry, Vitalis leaves Robert's service abruptly, and after being escorted back to him, Robert begs for Vitalis' pardon for his actions.

Vitalis gained the respect and confidence of Robert, who bestowed upon him a canonry in the collegiate church of Saint Evroul at Mortain, which he had founded in 1082.

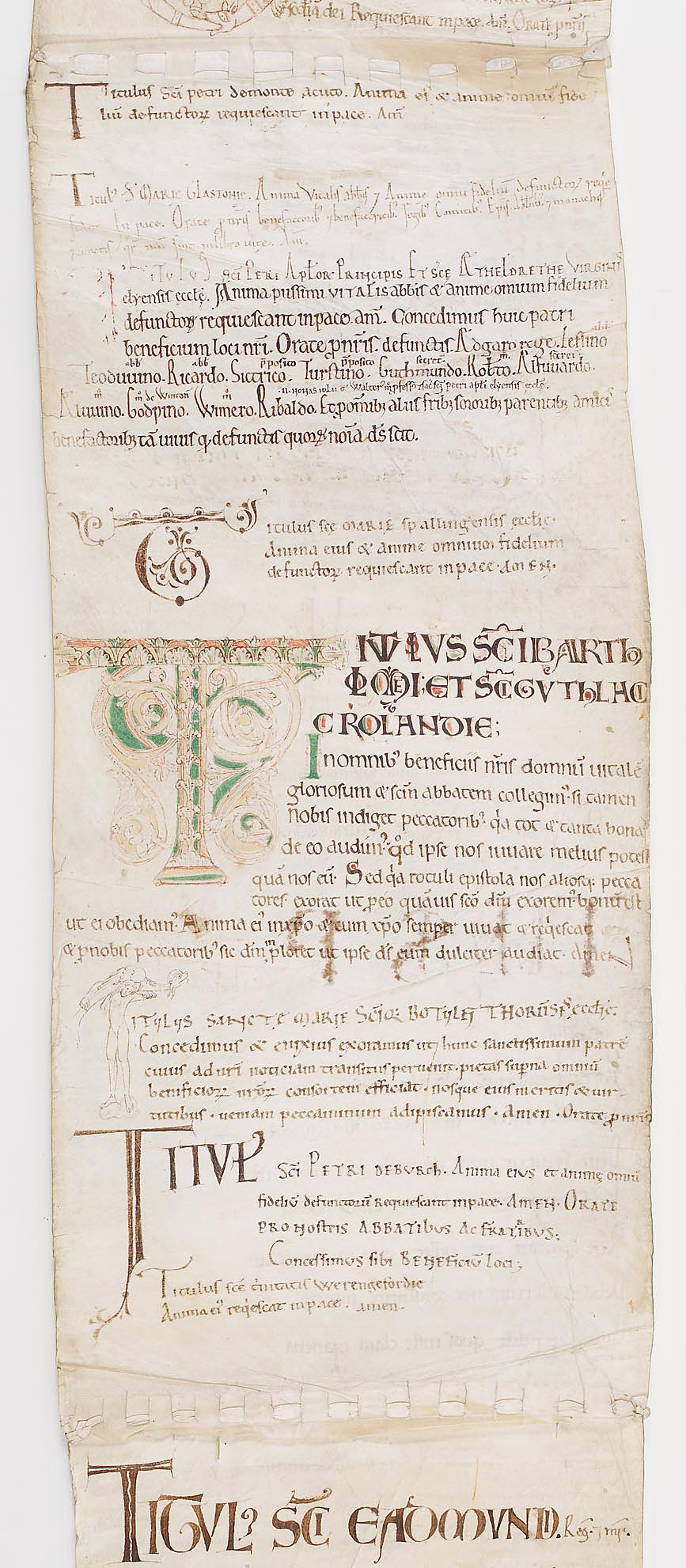
Mortuary roll of Vitalis of Savigny

=== Hermit, itinerant preacher and abbot of Savigny ===
Vitalis felt a desire for a more perfect state of life. He gave up his canonry in 1095, settled at Dompierre, 19 miles east of Mortain, and became one of the leaders of the hermit colony of the forest of Craon together with Bernard of Thiron and Robert of Arbrissel. Here for seventeen years he lived an ascetic life, and was called Vital le Vieux ("Vitalis the Old") taken from his father's name. At the same time he concerned himself, like his mentor Robert of Arbrissel, with the salvation of the surrounding population, giving practical help to the outcasts who gathered round him. It is further known that he helped prostitutes into lawful marriages and that he showed special compassion to prisoners.

He was also an itinerant preacher, remarkable for zeal, insensible to fatigue, and fearlessly outspoken; he is said to have attempted to reconcile Henry I of England with his brother, Robert Curthose. He seems to have visited England and a considerable part of western France, but Normandy was the chief scene of his labours. Between 1105 and 1120 he founded a monastery of nuns, Abbaye Blanche, at Mortain, with his sister Adeline—later canonized—as abbess. Between 1112 and 1122 Vitalis was abbot of the newly founded abbey of Savigny whose protection was guaranteed by Pope Calixtus II in Angers in September 1119.

Vitalis died at Savigny, on 16 September 1122. At the time of his death, he was abbot of 140 religious, both men and women and some members likely from aristocratic families. Although Vitalis was recognised as a saint some time after his death by the local population, a request for formal canonisation in 1244 had no success and thus Vitalis was canonised only in 1738 by the Cistercian General Chapter.

== Sources ==
Much about Vitalis is known from the vita written 50 years after his death by Stephen de Fougères who had been, like Vitalis himself, a canon at the Church of Saint-Evroult in Mortain before becoming bishop of Rennes. Stephen wrote in his prologue to this vita that his sources include vernacular writing, recollection of trustworthy men as well as Vitalis' mortuary roll, particularly the cover letter. This mortuary roll has been preserved more or less intact (although the cover letter has been lost), and is more than 9 meters long (see picture on the right).

Other sources include Orderic Vitalis, the biography of Bernard of Tiron (written around 1147) as well as a treatise written by Robert of Torigni.

== Sources ==
- Feiss, Hugh; O'Brien, Maureen M.; Pepin, Ronald (November 2014). The Lives of Monastic Reformers 2: Abbot Vitalis of Savigny, Abbot Godfrey of Savigny, Peter of Avranches, and Blessed Hamo. Liturgical Press. ISBN 9780879076931.
- Shopkow, Leah (2021). Saint and the Count: A Case Study for Reading like a Historian. University of Toronto Press. ISBN 9781487525866.
