= Vengeons =

- Part of Sourdeval
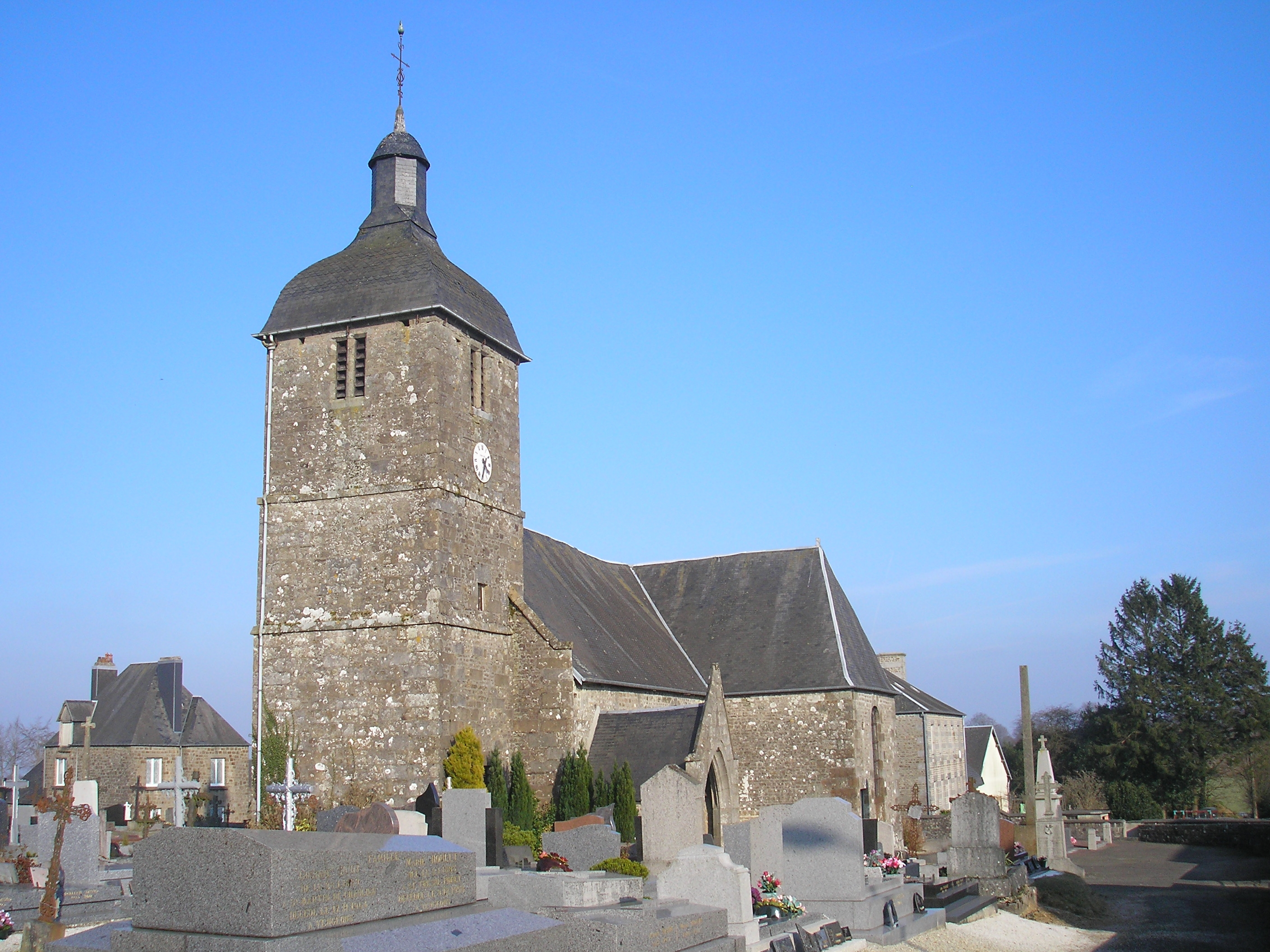

- Coat of arms
- Location of Vengeons
- Location within France Location within Normandy
- Coordinates: 48°45′20″N 0°54′55″W
- Country: France
- Region: Normandy
- Department: Manche
- Arrondissement: Avranches
- Canton: Le Mortainais
- Commune: Sourdeval
- Area^{1}: 15.75 km^{2} (6.08 sq mi)
- Highest elevation: 352 m (1,155 ft)
- Lowest elevation: 160 m (520 ft)
- Population (2022): 456
  - Density: 29.0/km^{2} (75.0/sq mi)
- Demonym: Vengeonnais
- Time zone: UTC+01:00 (CET)
  - Summer (DST): UTC+02:00 (CEST)
- Postal code: 50150
- ^{1} French Land Register data, which excludes lakes, ponds, glaciers > 1 km^{2} (0.386 sq mi or 247 acres) and river estuaries.

Vengeons (French pronunciation: [vɑ̃ʒɔ̃]) is a former commune in the Manche department in Normandy in north-western France. On 1 January 2016, it was merged into the commune of Sourdeval.

== See also ==
- Communes of the Manche department
