= Le Breuil-Benoît Abbey =

Former Cistercian abbey in Eure, France

Coordinates: 48°48′32″N 1°21′19″E

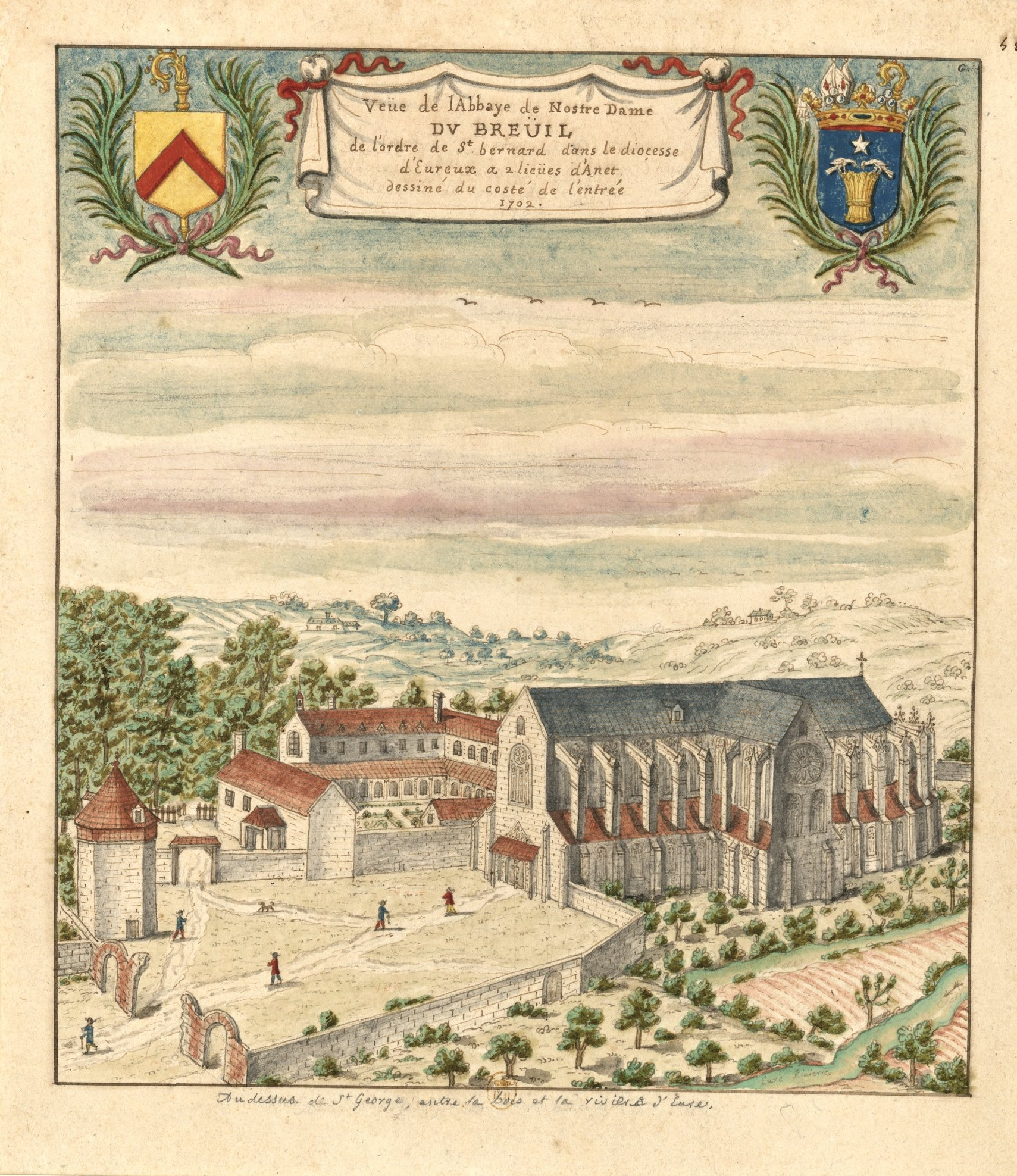
Le Breuil-Benoît Abbey in 1702.

Le Breuil-Benoît Abbey (Latin: Brolium Benedicti, French: Abbaye Notre-Dame du Breuil-Benoît) is a former Cistercian abbey in Marcilly-sur-Eure in the Eure department of Normandy, France. It is located around 10 km to the west of Dreux, on the left bank of the river Eure.

== History ==
The abbey was founded in 1137 by Foulques, lord of Marcilly, and his son Guillaume consequent upon an oath made in the Holy Land, and settled with monks from Vaux-de-Cernay Abbey, as a member of the congregation of Savigny Abbey. The abbey was soon able to settle a foundation of its own, that of La Trappe Abbey in 1140. In 1147 the Savigniac houses became part of the Cistercian movement, among them Breuil-Benoît, which was made a daughter house of the filiation of Clairvaux.

In 1421 the troops of Henry V of England occupied the abbey, set the church on fire, plundered the conventual buildings and killed the monks.

By 1762 the monastery, which had meanwhile fallen into the hands of commendatory abbots, comprised only two monks. It was dissolved in 1790 during the French Revolution and partly demolished. It has been classed as a monument historique since 1993.

== Buildings and site ==
In the grounds, converted into a park, the church still stands, the only extant Cistercian church in Normandy. Restoration works were carried out in 1855, and further works have been in progress since 1995. Built between 1190 and 1224, the Gothic church contains a vaulted nave and two aisles of six spans. The west front has two lancet windows, two oculi and a double door. The western walls of the transept remain, as do the five radiating chapels that form the semi-circular chevet behind the choir. The abbot's house, converted into a gentleman's residence in the 1550s, is also still extant, but most of the other buildings have disappeared.

== Sources ==
- Peugniez, Bernard: Routier cistercien, p. 320. Editions Gaud: Moisenay ISBN 2-84080-044-6
