= Savigny Abbey =

Ruined monastery in Normandy, France

Coordinates: 48°30′7″N 1°1′40″W

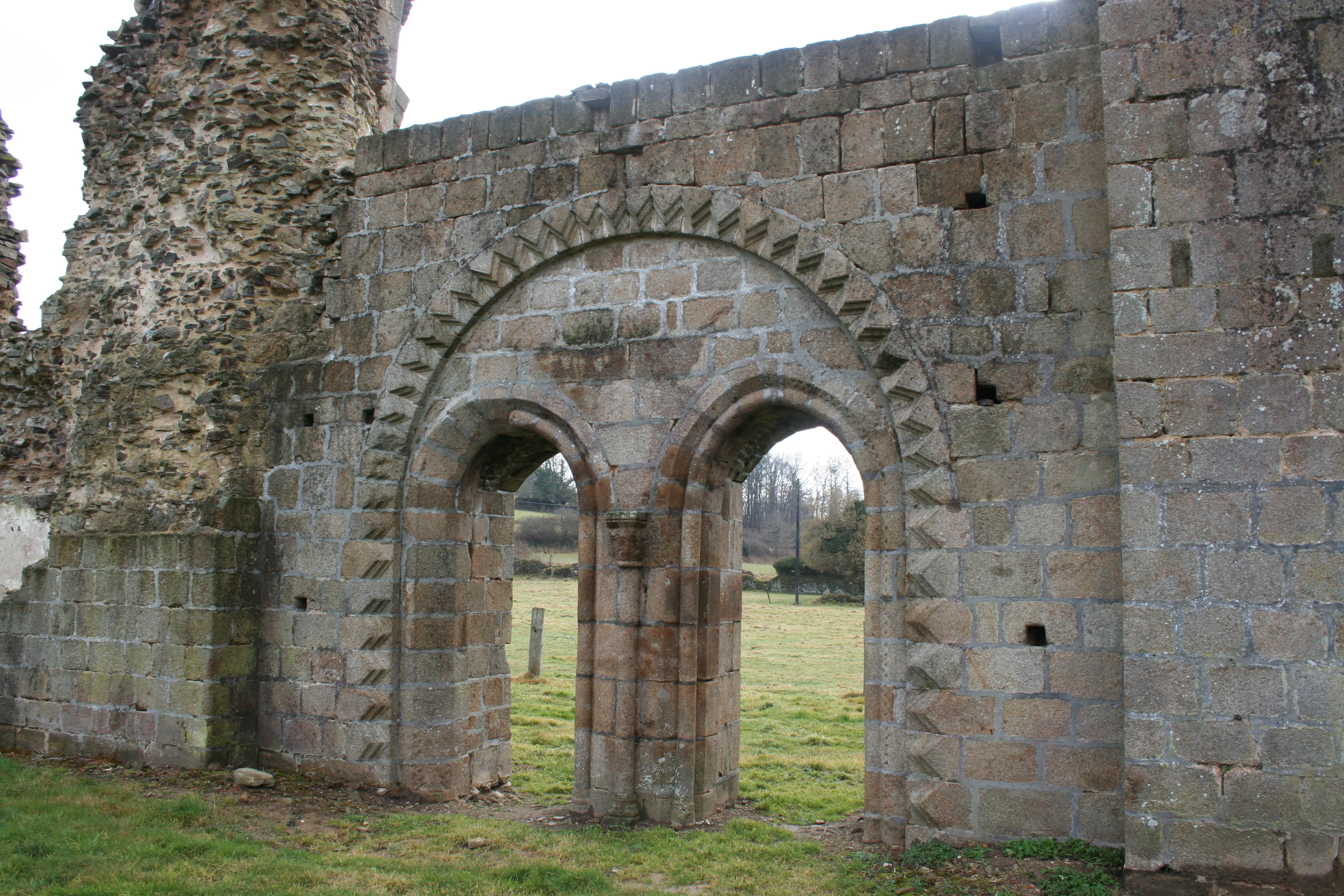
Ruins of Savigny Abbey

Savigny Abbey (Abbaye de Savigny) was a monastery near the village of Savigny-le-Vieux (Manche), in northern France. It was founded early in the 12th century. Initially it was the central house of the Congregation of Savigny, who were Benedictines; by 1150 it was Cistercian.

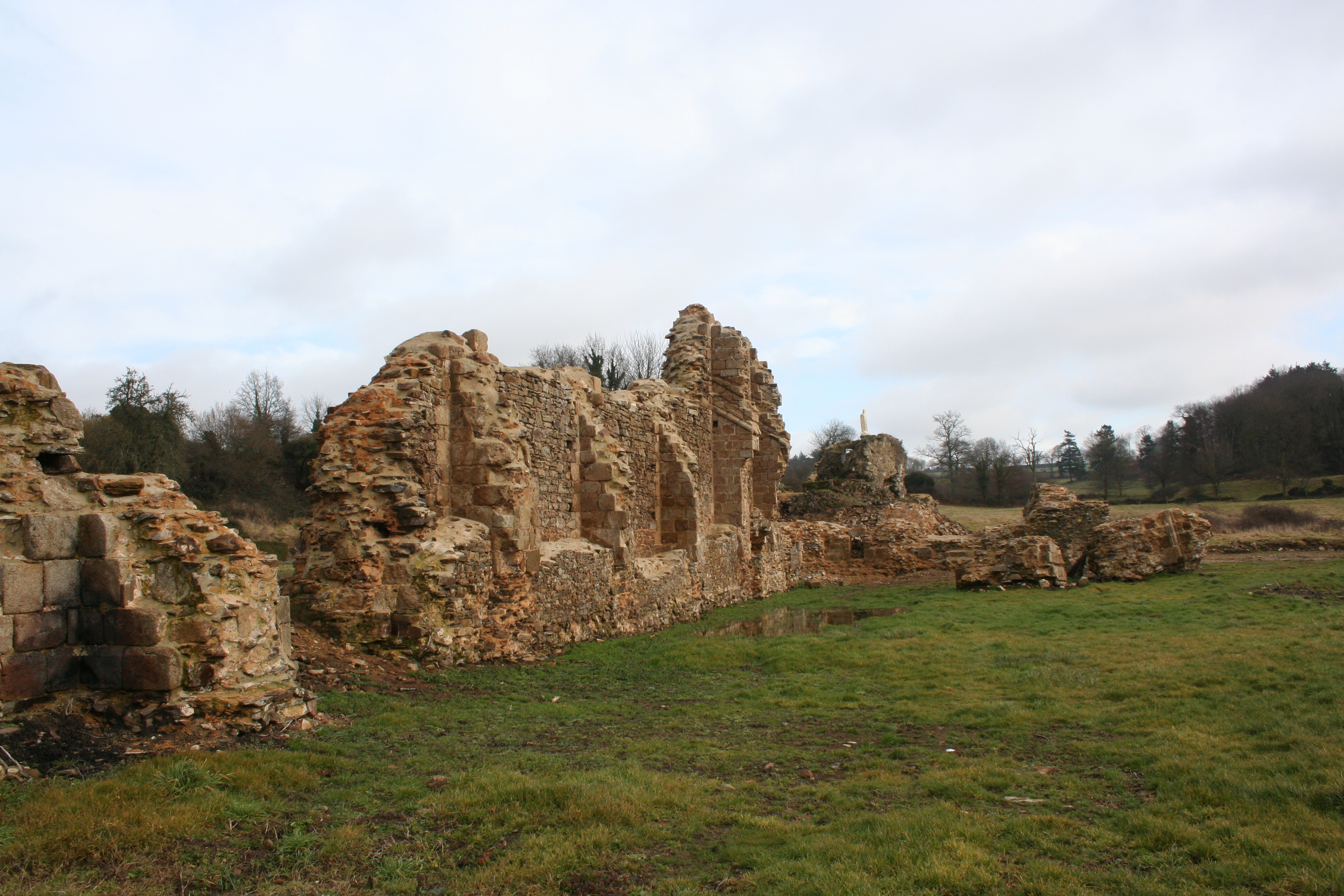
Savigny Abbey

== History ==
It was situated on the confines of Normandy and Brittany. The founder was Vitalis de Mortain, Canon of the Collegiate Church of St. Evroul, who, resigning his prebend to embrace an eremitical life under Robert of Arbrissel in the forest of Craon (Anjou), and leaving the latter, retired to the forest of Savigny (1105), where he built a hermitage. Soon, however, the number of disciples who gathered around him necessitated the construction of adequate buildings, in which was instituted the monastic life, following the Rule of St. Benedict, and interpreted in a manner similar to the Cistercians.

Around 1115, Rudolph, lord of Fougeres, confirmed the grants he had formerly made to Vital, and monastery of Our Lady of Savigny was established. The abbey was home to as many as 120 monks. Aimo of Landecob was a noted member. It was the mother of the Benedictine reform in Normandy and within thirty years it had 33 subordinate houses, including Vaux-de-Cernay Abbey.

In 1119 Pope Celestine II, then in Angers, took it under his immediate protection, and strongly commended it to the neighbouring nobles. Robert fitz Martin and his wife, Maud, granted to Savigny Abbey land at Vengeons. Under Geoffroy, successor to Vitalis, Henry I of England established and generously endowed 29 monasteries of this Congregation in his dominions. Bernard of Clairvaux also held them in high esteem, and it was at his request that their monks, in the times of the antipope Anacletus, declared in favour of Pope Innocent II.

Serlon, third successor of the Founder, found it difficult to retain his jurisdiction over the English monasteries, who wished to make themselves independent, and so determined to affiliate the entire Congregation to Citeaux, which was effected at the General Chapter of 1147.

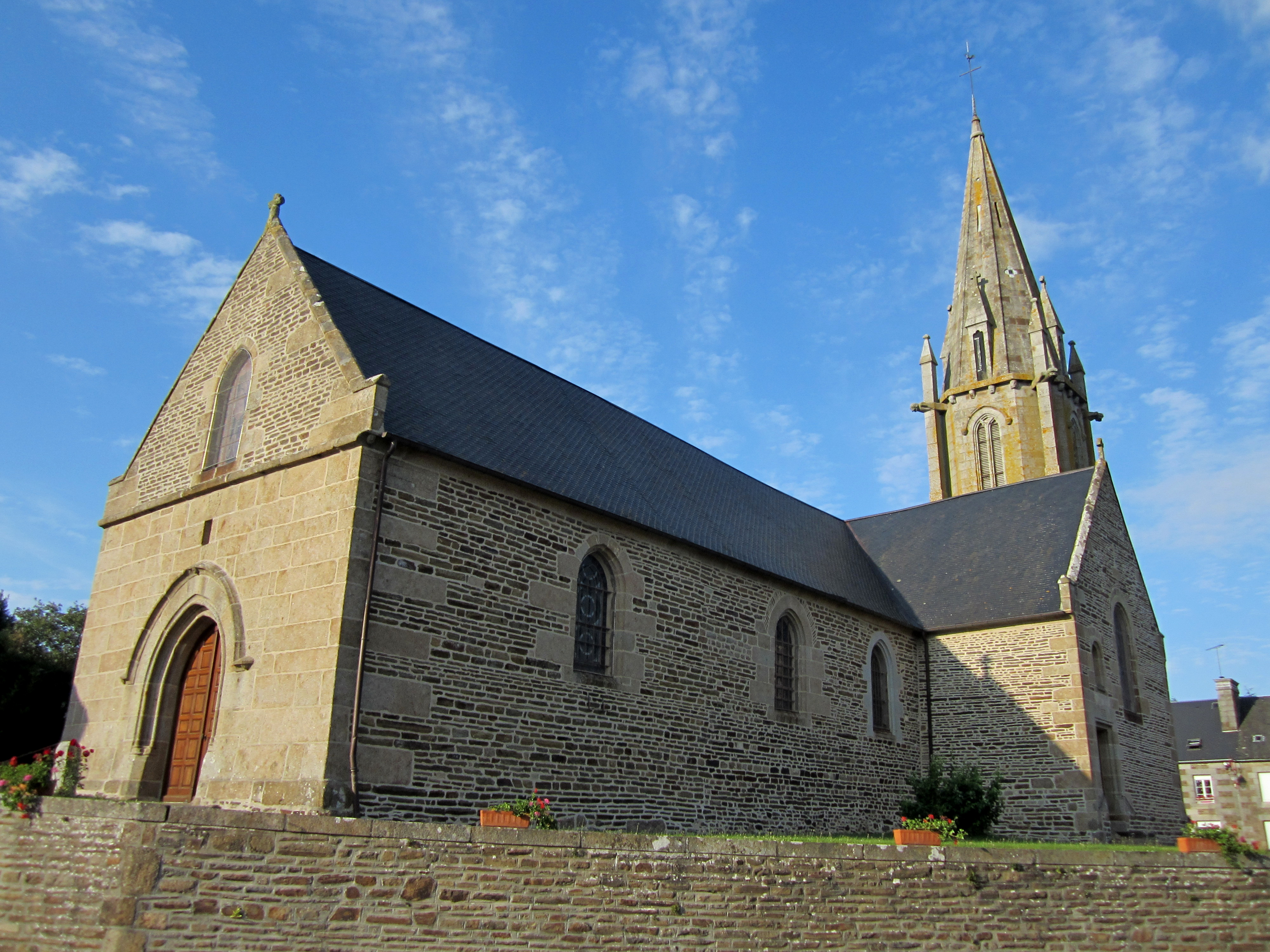
Église Notre-Dame de Savigny-le-Vieux

Little by little discipline became relaxed, and once commendatory abbots were introduced (1501) it never regained its first greatness. In 1509 it was pillaged and partly burned by the Calvinists, and records of the following year mention but twenty-four monks remaining. It continued to exist until the Revolution reduced it to a heap of ruins. In 1791 it was purchased for a quarry and much of the stone sold off. In 1838, archaeologist Arcisse de Caumont purchased the Romanesque gate in order to preserve it.

The church, a model of Cistercian architecture, was restored in 1869. The abbey was listed as a Monument historique by the French Ministry of Culture in 1924, and now serves for parish purposes.

== Burials ==
- Isabelle de Meulan (†1220) benefactress
- Robert Stitchill (†1274) (though his heart was buried at Durham Cathedral)

== See also ==
- Congregation of Savigny

== Sources ==
- Tissier, Bibliotheca patrum cisterciensum (Bonnefont, 1660–69);
