= Savigny-le-Vieux =

- Commune
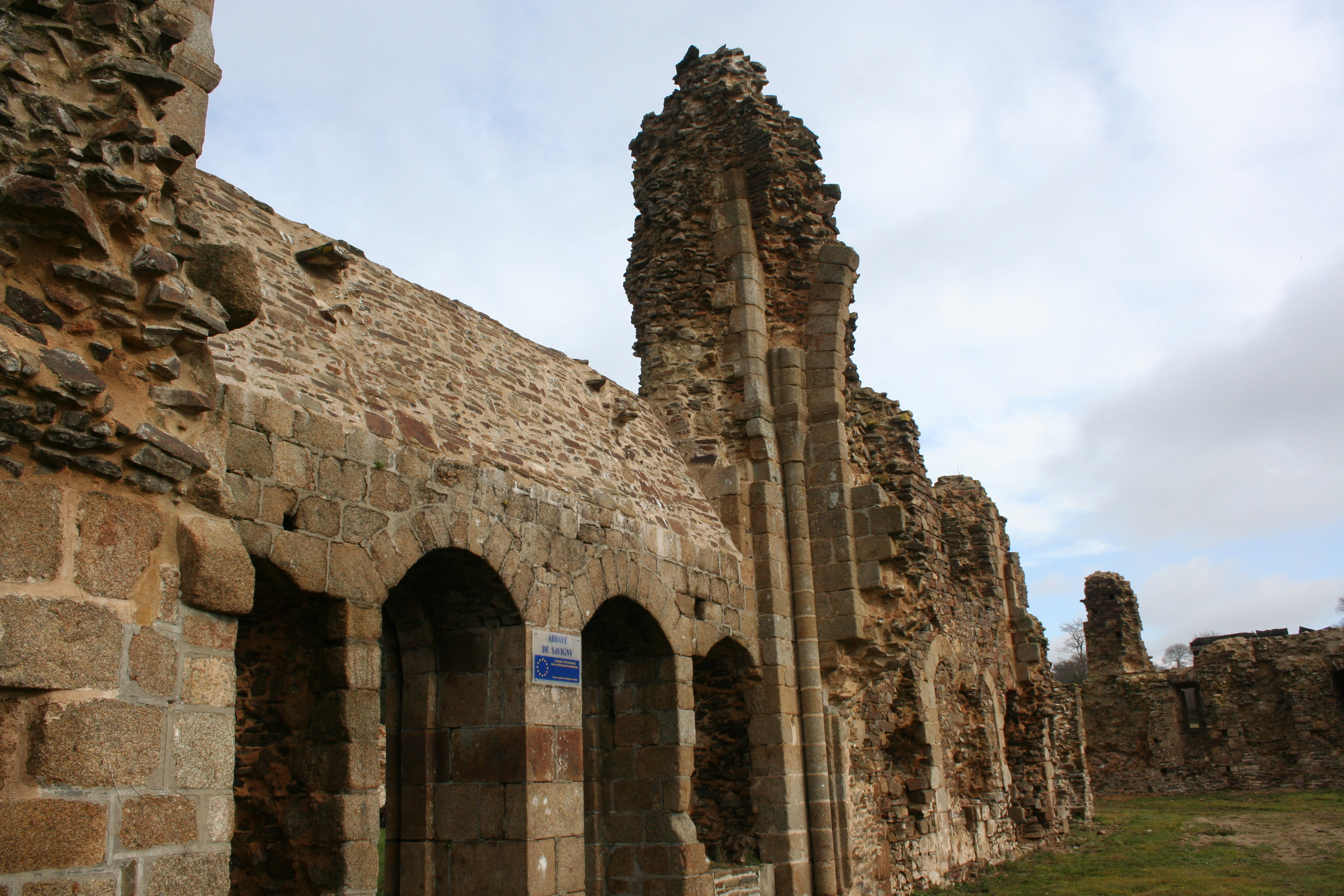
- Ruins of the abbey
- Location of Savigny-le-Vieux
- Location within France Location within Normandy
- Coordinates: 48°31′18″N 1°02′49″W
- Country: France
- Region: Normandy
- Department: Manche
- Arrondissement: Avranches
- Canton: Saint-Hilaire-du-Harcouët
- Intercommunality: CA Mont-Saint-Michel-Normandie

Government
  - Mayor (2020–2026): Patrick Lepeltier
- Area^{1}: 17.16 km^{2} (6.63 sq mi)
- Elevation: 150 m (490 ft)
- Highest elevation: 220 m (720 ft)
- Lowest elevation: 87 m (285 ft)
- Population (2023): 399
  - Density: 23.3/km^{2} (60.2/sq mi)
- Time zone: UTC+01:00 (CET)
  - Summer (DST): UTC+02:00 (CEST)
- INSEE/Postal code: 50570 /50640
- ^{1} French Land Register data, which excludes lakes, ponds, glaciers > 1 km^{2} (0.386 sq mi or 247 acres) and river estuaries.

Savigny-le-Vieux (French pronunciation: [saviɲi lə vjø]) is a commune in the Manche department in Normandy in north-western France.

== See also ==
- Savigny Abbey
- Communes of the Manche department
