= List of Premonstratensian monasteries in France =

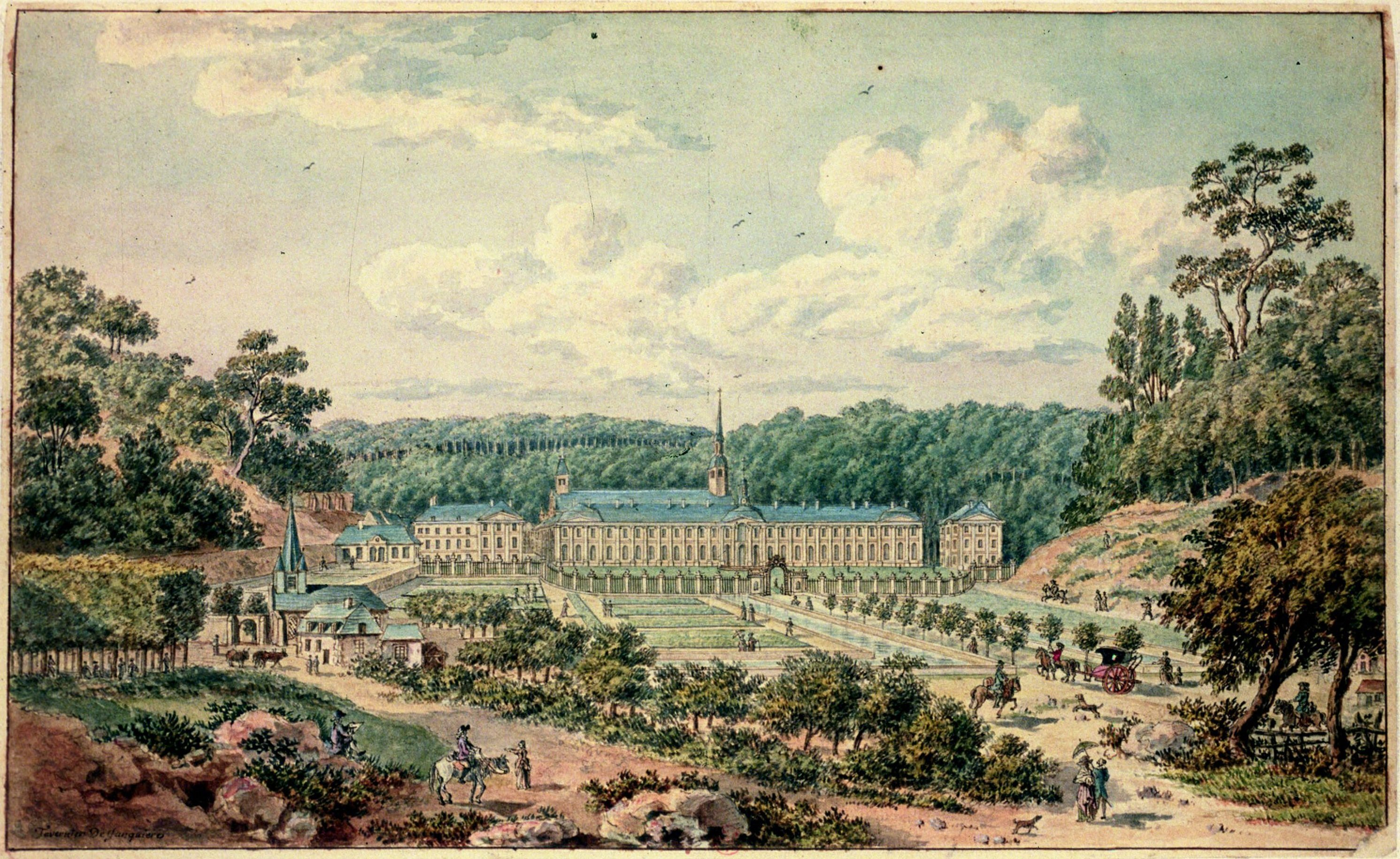
Prémontré Abbey, motherhouse of the Premonstratensians, in the 18th century

This article is a list of Premonstratensian monasteries in France, that is to say, monasteries or nunneries belonging to the Premonstratensian Order of canons regular, following the Rule of St. Augustine. In the early days of the order its foundations were mostly double monasteries, viz., communities containing both canons and nuns. After a few decades however the joint houses were separated.

The dates given, unless otherwise indicated, are the dates when an establishment began and ended its Premontratensian career, which is not necessarily the same as its lifespan as a religious house.

Extant abbeys are indicated by bold characters.

Dependent priories are not listed.

== A ==
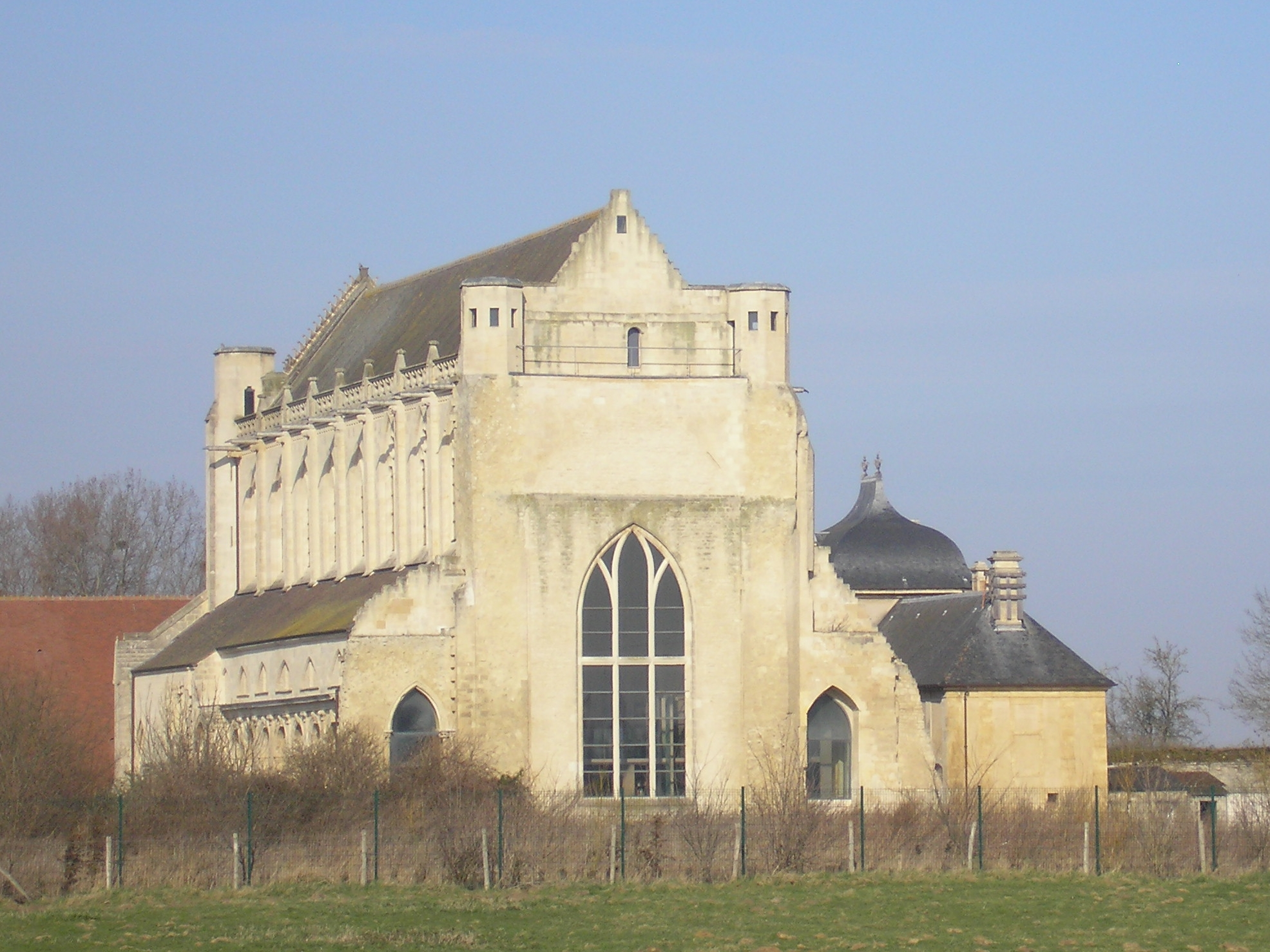
Ardenne Abbey (Calvados)

- Abbecourt Abbey (Abbaye Notre-Dame d'Abbecourt), Diocese of Chartres, later Diocese of Versailles (1180-1790) (Orgeval, Yvelines)
- St. John the Baptist's Abbey, Amiens (Abbaye Saint-Jean-Baptiste d'Amiens), Diocese of Amiens (1135-1790) (Amiens, Somme)
- Ardenne Abbey (Abbaye d'Ardenne or Abbaye Notre-Dame d'Ardenne), Diocese of Bayeux (1150-1790) (Saint-Germain-la-Blanche-Herbe, Calvados)
- Arthous Abbey (Abbaye d'Arthous or Abbaye Notre-Dame d'Arthous), Diocese of Aire and Dax (c. 1160-1790) (Hastingues, Landes)
- Abbey of St. Marianus, Auxerre (Abbaye Saint-Marien d'Auxerre) (1139-1790), Diocese of Auxerre, later Diocese of Sens (Auxerre, Yonne)
- Avigny Abbey (Abbaye Notre-Dame d'Avigny), Diocese of Châlons, later Diocese of Langres (Hallignicourt, Haute-Marne)

== B ==
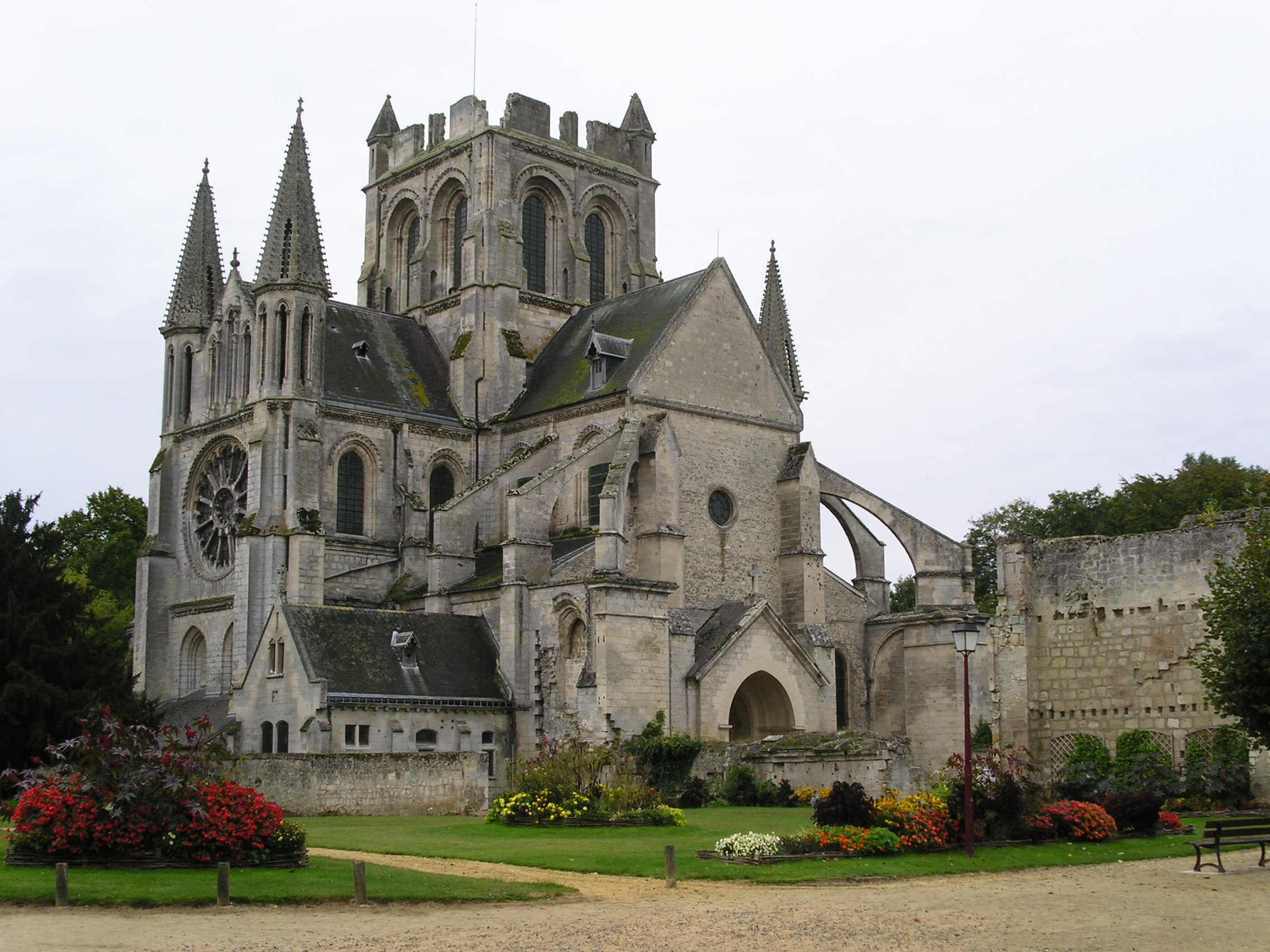
Abbey of St. Yved, Braine (Aisne)

- Bassefontaine Abbey (Abbaye Notre-Dame et Saint-Jean-Baptiste de Bassefontaine), Diocese of Troyes (1143-1773) (Brienne-la-Vieille, Aube)
- Beaulieu Abbey (Abbaye Notre-Dame de Beaulieu), Diocese of Troyes (Trannes, Aube)
- Beauport Abbey (Abbaye Notre-Dame de Beauport), Diocese of Saint-Brieuc (Paimpol, Côtes-d'Armor)
- Belchamp Abbey (Abbaye Notre-Dame de Belchamp), Diocese of Besançon (Voujeaucourt, Doubs)
- Belle-Étoile Abbey (Abbaye Notre-Dame de Belle-Étoile), Diocese of Bayeux, later Diocese of Séez (1216-?) (Cerisy-Belle-Étoile, Orne)
- Bellevaux Abbey (Abbaye Notre-Dame et Saint-Paul de Bellevaux), Diocese of Nevers (Limanton, Nièvre)
- Bellozanne Abbey or Bellosanne Abbey (Abbaye Notre-Dame de Bellozanne or Bellosanne), Diocese of Rouen (1198-?) (Brémontier-Merval, Seine-Maritime)
- Belval Abbey (Abbaye Notre-Dame de Belval), Diocese of Reims (Belval-Bois-des-Dames, Ardennes)
- Benoîte-Vaux Abbey (Abbaye de Benoîte-Vaux), Diocese of Verdun (Rambluzin-et-Benoite-Vaux, Meuse)
- Blanchelande Abbey (Abbaye de Blanchelande or Abbaye Notre-Dame et Saint-Nicolas de Blanchelande), Diocese of Coutances (1154-) (Neufmesnil, Manche)
- Bonfays Abbey (Abbaye Notre-Dame de Bonfays), Diocese of Toul, later Diocese of Saint-Dié (Légéville-et-Bonfays, Vosges)
- Abbey of St. Yved, Braine (Abbaye Saint-Yved de Braine), Diocese of Soissons (Braine, Aisne)
- Bucilly Abbey (Abbaye Saint-Pierre de Bucilly), Diocese of Laon, later Diocese of Soissons (Bucilly, Aisne)

== C ==
- Abbaye Notre-Dame de la Capelle, Diocese of Toulouse (Merville, Haute-Garonne)
- Case-Dieu or Case-de-Dieu Abbey (Abbaye Notre-Dame de la Case-Dieu or Case-de-Dieu), Diocese of Auch (Beaumarchés, Gers)
- Chambrefontaine Abbey (Abbaye Notre-Dame de Chambrefontaine), Diocese of Meaux (1190-) (Cuisy, Seine-et-Marne)
- Chapelle-aux-Planches Abbey (Abbaye Notre-Dame de la Chapelle-aux-Planches), Diocese of Troyes, later Diocese of Langres (Puellemontier, Haute-Marne)
- Chartreuve Abbey (Abbaye Notre-Dame de Chartreuve), Diocese of Soissons (Chéry-Chartreuve, Aisne)
- Châteaudieu Abbey (Abbaye Saint-Martin de Châteaudieu), Diocese of Tournai, later Diocese of Arras, later Diocese of Cambrai (Mortagne-du-Nord, Nord)
- Château-l'Abbaye Abbey (Abbaye Saint-Martin de Château-l'Abbaye), Diocese of Cambrai, later Diocese of Arras (1135-?) (Château-l'Abbaye, Nord)
- Chaumont-la-Piscine Abbey (Abbaye Saints Berthold et Arnaud de Chaumont-la-Piscine), Diocese of Reims (Chaumont-Porcien, Ardennes)
- Clairfontaine Abbey (Abbaye Saint-Nicolas de Clairfontaine), Diocese of Soissons (Clairfontaine, Aisne)
- Clermont Abbey (Abbaye Saint-André de Clermont), Diocese of Clermont (Clermont-Ferrand, Puy-de-Dôme)
- Combelongue Abbey (Abbaye de Combelongue or Abbaye Saint-Laurent de Combelongue), Diocese of Couserans, later Diocese of Pamiers (1238-1790) (Rimont, Ariège)
- Corneux Abbey (Abbaye Notre-Dame de Corneux), Diocese of Besançon (1134-1790) (Saint-Broing, Haute-Saône)
- Cuissy Abbey or Cuisy Abbey (Abbaye de Cuissy or Cuisy, or Abbaye Notre-Dame de Cuissy or Cuisy), Diocese of Laon, later Diocese of Soissons (Cuissy-et-Geny, Aisne)

== D ==
- Dilo Abbey or Dilot Abbey (Abbaye de Dilo or Dilot, or Abbaye Notre-Dame de l'Assomption de Dilo or Dilot), Diocese of Sens (1132-?) (Arces-Dilo, Yonne)
- Divielle Abbey (Abbaye de Divielle or Abbaye Notre-Dame de Divielle), Diocese of Amiens, later Diocese of Arras (1209-?) (Goos, Landes)
- Dommartin Abbey or Dompmartin Abbey, also St. Josse's Abbey, Dommartin; formerly Saint-Josse-au-Bois Abbey (Abbaye Saint-Josse de Dommartin or Dompmartin), Diocese of Arras, later Diocese of Amiens (Tortefontaine, Pas-de-Calais)
- Doue Abbey, Doë Abbey or Doe-en-Vellay Abbey (Abbaye Saint-Jacques de Doue or Doë or Doe-en-Vellay), Diocese of Le Puy (Saint-Germain-Laprade, Haute-Loire)

== E ==
- L'Étanche Abbey or L'Étang Abbey (Abbaye Notre-Dame de l'Annonciation de l'Étanche or l'Étang), Diocese of Verdun (Lamorville, Meuse)
- Étival Abbey (Abbaye Saint-Pierre d'Étival), Diocese of Toul, later Diocese of Saint-Dié (Étival-Clairefontaine, Vosges)
- L'Étoile Abbey (Abbaye Sainte-Trinité et Saint-Sauveur de l'Étoile), Diocese of Chartres, later Diocese of Blois (Authon, Loir-et-Cher)

== F ==
- Falaise Abbey otherwise the Abbey of St John the Baptist, Falaise (Abbaye Saint-Jean-Baptiste de Falaise), Diocese of Séez, later Diocese of Bayeux-Lisieux (Falaise, Calvados)
- Flabémont Abbey (Abbaye Notre-Dame de l'Assomption de Flabémont), Diocese of Toul, later Diocese of Saint-Dié (Tignécourt, Vosges)
- Fontcaude Abbey (Abbaye de Fontcaude or Abbaye Notre-Dame de Fontcaude), Diocese of Narbonne, later Diocese of Montpellier (1179-1791) (Cazedarnes, Hérault)
- Frigolet Abbey (Abbaye Saint-Michel de Frigolet), Diocese of Avignon, later Diocese of Aix and Arles (Tarascon, Bouches-du-Rhône)

== G ==
- Genlis Abbey (Abbaye Sainte-Élisabeth de Genlis), Diocese of Noyon, later Diocese of Soissons (Villequier-Aumont, Aisne)
- Grandchamp Abbey (Abbaye de Grandchamp or Abbaye Notre-Dame de Grandchamp), Diocese of Chartres, later Diocese of Versailles (Grandchamp, Yvelines)

== H ==
- Hermières Abbey (Abbaye Saint-Nicolas d'Hermières), Diocese of Paris, later Diocese of Meaux (Favières, Seine-et-Marne)
- Huveaune Abbey (Abbaye Notre-Dame d'Huveaune), Diocese of Marseille (Marseille, Bouches-du-Rhône)

== I ==
- L'Île-Dieu Abbey (Abbaye Notre-Dame de l'Île-Dieu or de l'Isle-Dieu), Diocese of Rouen, later Diocese of Évreux (Perruel, Eure)

== J ==
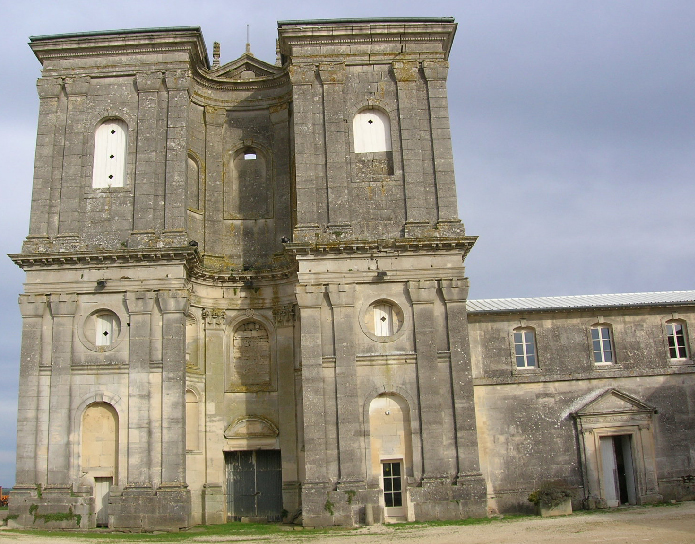
Jovilliers Abbey (Meuse)

- Jandeures Abbey or Jandures Abbey (Abbaye Notre-Dame de l'Assomption de Jandeures or Jandures), Diocese of Toul, later Diocese of Verdun (Lisle-en-Rigault, Meuse)
- Jovilliers Abbey or Jovillers Abbey (Abbaye de Jovilliers or Abbaye Saint-Pierre de Jovilliers or Jovillers), Diocese of Toul, later Diocese of Verdun (Stainville, Meuse)
- Joyenval Abbey (Abbaye de Joyenval or de Notre-Dame et Saint-Barthélemy de Joyenval), Diocese of Chartres, later Diocese of Versailles (Chambourcy, Yvelines)
- Justemont Abbey (Abbaye Notre-Dame de l'Assomption de Justemont), Diocese of Metz (Vitry-sur-Orne, Moselle)

== L ==
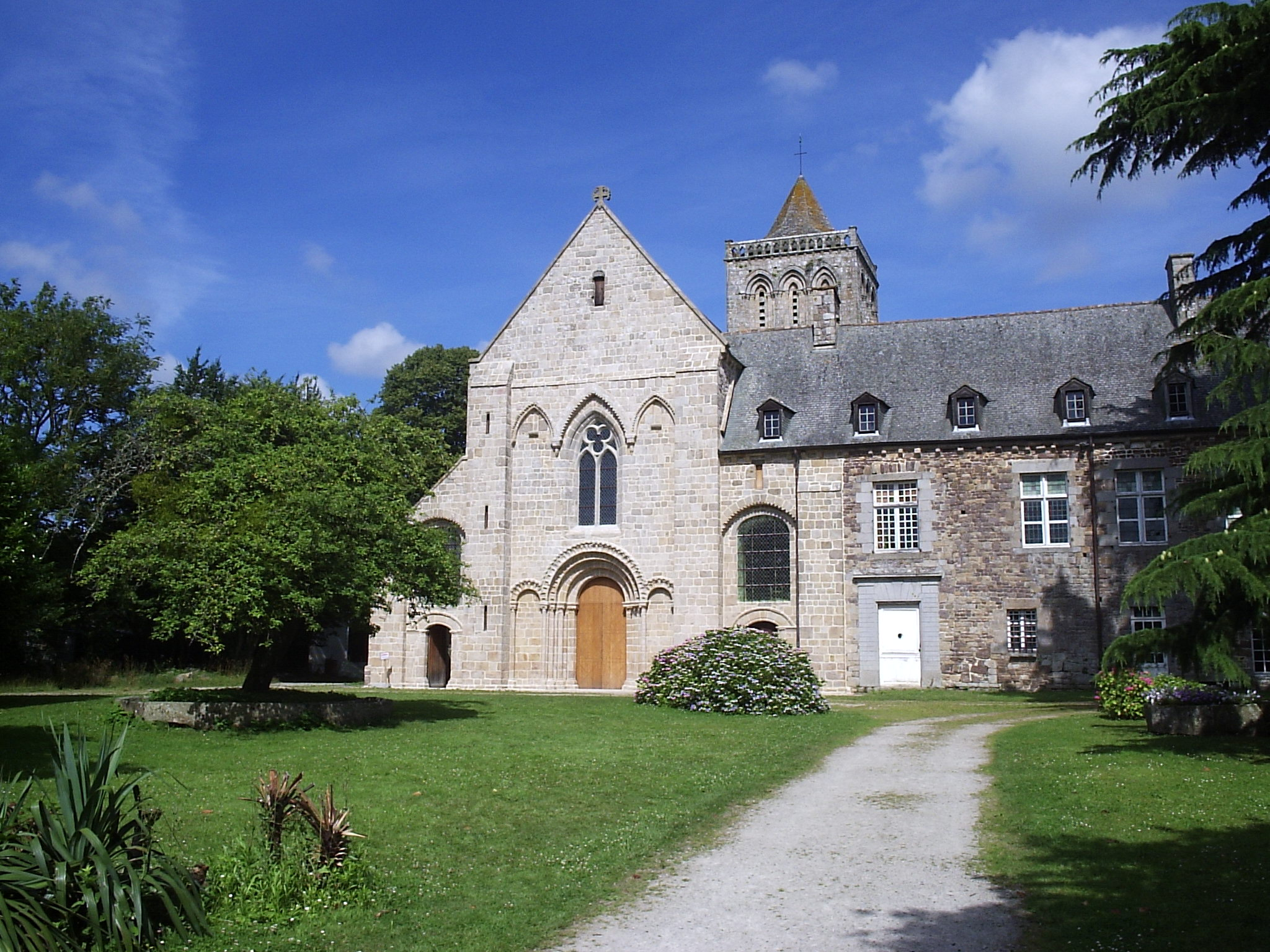
La Lucerne Abbey (Manche)

- Lahonce Abbey (Abbaye Notre-Dame de Lahonce), Diocese of Bayonne (Lahonce, Pyrénées-Atlantiques)
- Abbey of St. Martin, Laon (Abbaye Saint-Martin de Laon), Diocese of Langres (Laon, Aisne)
- Lavaldieu Abbey (Abbaye Notre-Dame et Saint-Rémi de Lavaldieu), Diocese of Reims (Monthermé, Ardennes)
- Licques Abbey (Abbaye Notre-Dame de Licques), Diocese of Boulogne (Licques, Pas-de-Calais)
- Lieu-Dieu Abbey (Abbaye Notre-Dame de Lieu-Dieu, Abbaye royale Notre-Dame de Lieu-Dieu), Diocese of Poitiers, later Diocese of Luçon, (La Genétouze, later Jard-sur-Mer, Vendée)
- Lieu-Restauré Abbey (Abbaye Notre-Dame de Lieu-Restauré), Diocese of Soissons, later Diocese of Beauvais (1140-?) (Bonneuil-en-Valois, Oise)
- Longwé Abbey (Abbaye Sainte-Marie-Madeleine de Longwé), Diocese of Reims (Montgon, Ardennes)
- La Lucerne Abbey (Abbaye de la Lucerne or Abbaye de la Sainte-Trinité de la Lucerne), Diocese of Avranches, later Diocese of Coutances (1143-?) (La Lucerne-d'Outremer, Manche)

== M ==
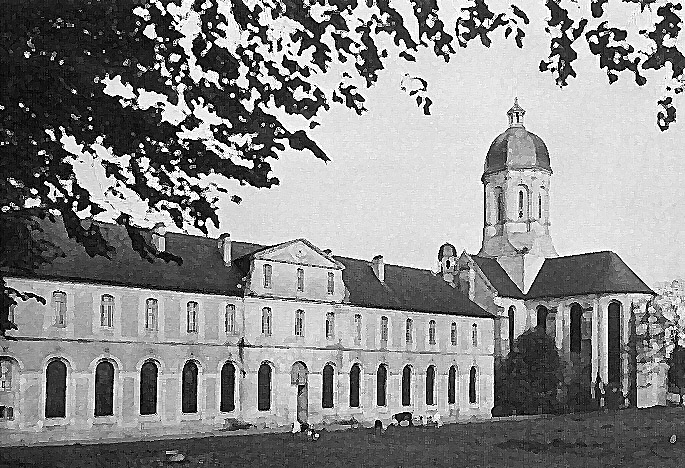
Mondaye Abbey

- Marcheroux Abbey or Marché-Raoul Abbey (Abbaye Saint-Nicolas de Marcheroux or Marché-Raoul), Diocese of Rouen (Beaumont-les-Nonains, Oise)
- Abbey of St. Cross and St. Eligius, Metz (Abbaye Sainte-Croix et Saint-Éloi de Metz), Diocese of Metz (Metz, Moselle)
- Moncetz Abbey or Moncels Abbey (Abbaye Notre-Dame de Moncetz or Moncels), Diocese of Châlons-sur-Marne (Moncetz-l'Abbaye, Marne)
- Mondaye Abbey (Abbaye de Mondaye or Abbaye Saint-Martin de Mondaye), Diocese of Lisieux (Juaye-Mondaye, Calvados)
- Mont-Saint-Martin Abbey (Abbaye Notre-Dame du Mont-Saint-Martin), Diocese of Cambrai, later Diocese of Soissons (Gouy, Aisne)
- Mureau Abbey (Abbaye Notre-Dame de Mureau), Diocese of Toul, later Diocese of Saint-Dié (1049-1790) (Pargny-sous-Mureau, Vosges)

== N ==
- Abbey of St. Joseph, Nancy (Abbaye Saint-Joseph de Nancy), Diocese of Toul, later Diocese of Nancy-Toul (Nancy, Meurthe-et-Moselle)
- Neuffontaines Abbey (Abbaye Saint-Gilbert de Neuffontaines), Diocese of Clermont, later Diocese of Moulins (Saint-Didier-la-Forêt, Allier)

== P ==
- Perray-Neuf Abbey (Abbaye Notre-Dame du Perray-Neuf), Diocese of Le Mans (Précigné, Sarthe)
- Pleineselve Abbey (Abbaye de Pleineselve), Diocese of Bordeaux (Saint-Ciers-sur-Gironde, Gironde)
- Pont-à-Mousson Abbey (Abbaye de Pont-à-Mousson or Abbaye Sainte-Marie-Majeure de Pont-à-Mousson), Diocese of Toul, later Diocese of Nancy (Pont-à-Mousson, Meurthe-et-Moselle)
- Prémontré Abbey (Abbaye de Prémontré or Abbaye Saint-Jean-Baptiste de Prémontré), Diocese of Laon, later Diocese of Soissons; mother house of the order (Anizy-le-Château, Aisne)

== R ==
- Rengéval Abbey (Abbaye Sainte-Marie-Madeleine de Rengéval), Diocese of Toul, later Diocese of Verdun (Géville, Meuse)
- Ressons Abbey (Abbaye Notre-Dame de Ressons), Diocese of Rouen, later Diocese of Beauvais (1150-?) (Ressons-l'Abbaye, Oise)
- Riéval Abbey (Abbaye Notre-Dame de Riéval), Diocese of Toul, later Diocese of Verdun (Ménil-la-Horgne, Meuse)

== S ==
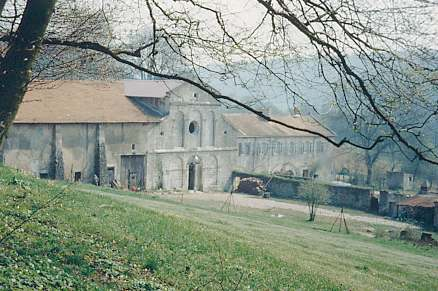
Sainte-Marie-au-Bois Abbey (Meurthe-et-Moselle)

- Saint-André-du-Bois Abbey (Abbaye Notre-Dame et Saint-André de Saint-André-du-Bois), Diocese of Amiens, later Diocese of Arras (Gouy-Saint-André, Pas-de-Calais)
- Saint-Augustin-lès-Thérouanne Abbey (Abbaye de Saint-Augustin-lès-Thérouanne), Diocese of Thérouanne, later Diocese of Saint-Omer, later Diocese of Arras (Thérouanne, Pas-de-Calais)
- Saint-Georges-des-Bois Abbey (Abbaye Saint-Georges de Saint-Georges-des-Bois), Diocese of Le Mans, later Diocese of Blois (Saint-Martin-des-Bois, Loir-et-Cher)
- Saint-Jean-de-la-Castelle Abbey (Abbaye Saint-Jean-Baptiste de Saint-Jean-de-la-Castelle), Diocese of Aire, later Diocese of Aire and Dax (Duhort-Bachen, Landes)
- Saint-Josse-au-Bois Abbey, see Dommartin Abbey
- Saint-Just-en-Chaussée Abbey (Abbaye Saint-Just de Saint-Just-en-Chaussée), Diocese of Beauvais (Saint-Just-en-Chaussée, Oise)
- Sainte-Marie-au-Bois Abbey (Abbaye de Sainte-Marie-au-Bois), Diocese of Toul, later Diocese of Nancy (Vilcey-sur-Trey, Meurthe-et-Moselle)
- Salival Abbey (Abbaye de Salival or Abbaye Notre-Dame de la Nativité de Salival), Diocese of Metz (Salival, Moselle, to 1888, Morville-lès-Vic 1888-1928, Moyenvic, Moselle, from 1928)
- Sélincourt Abbey (Abbaye de Sélincourt or Abbaye de la Sainte-Larme du Christ et Saint-Pierre de Sélincourt), Diocese of Amiens (Sélincourt, later Hornoy-le-Bourg, Somme)
- Abbey of St. Paul, Sens (Abbaye Saint-Paul de Sens), Diocese of Sens, later Diocese of Sens-Auxerre (Sens, Yonne)
- Septfontaines Abbey (Abbaye Notre-Dame et Saint-Nicolas de Septfontaines-en-Bassigny), Diocese of Langres (Andelot-Blancheville, Haute-Marne)
- Septfontaines Abbey (Abbaye Notre-Dame de Septfontaines-en-Thiérache), Diocese of Reims (Fagnon, Ardennes)
- Séry Abbey (Abbaye Notre-Dame de Séry-aux-Prés), Diocese of Amiens (Bouttencourt, Somme)
- Silly Abbey (Abbaye de Silly or Notre-Dame de l'Assomption et Saint-Laurent de Silly), Diocese of Séez (Silly-en-Gouffern, Orne)

== T ==
- Thenailles Abbey (Abbaye Notre-Dame de Thenailles), Diocese of Laon, later Diocese of Soissons (Thenailles, Aisne)

== V ==
- Vaas Abbey (Abbaye de Vaas or Abbaye Notre-Dame de Vaas), Diocese of Le Mans (1726-1790) (Vaas, Sarthe)
- Valchrétien Abbey (Abbaye de Valchrétien or Abbaye Notre-Dame et Saint-Ghislain de Valchrétien), Diocese of Soissons (Bruyères-sur-Fère, Aisne)
- Valsecret Abbey (Abbaye Notre-Dame de Valsecret), Diocese of Soissons (Brasles, Aisne)
- Valsery Abbey (Abbaye de Valsery or Abbaye Notre-Dame de Valsery), Diocese of Soissons (Cœuvres-et-Valsery, Aisne)
- Abbey of St. Paul, Verdun (Abbaye Saint-Paul de Verdun), Diocese of Verdun (Verdun, Meuse)
- Vermand Abbey (Abbaye de Vermand or Abbaye Notre-Dame et Saint-Quentin de Vermand), Diocese of Noyon, later Diocese of Soissons (Vermand, Aisne)
- Vicogne Abbey (Abbaye de Vicogne or Abbaye Saint-Blaise et Saint-Sébastien de Vicogne), Diocese of Arras, later Diocese of Cambrai (1132-1790) (Raismes, Nord)

== See also ==
- List of Christian monasteries in France
- List of Augustinian monasteries in France
- List of Benedictine monasteries in France
- List of Carthusian monasteries#France
- List of Cistercian monasteries in France

== Sources ==
- Ardura, Bernard, 1993: Abbayes, prieurés et monastères de l'ordre de Prémontré en France des origines à nos jours: dictionnaire historique et bibliographique. Nancy: Presses Universitaires de Nancy; Pont-à-Mousson: Centre Culturel des Prémontrés ISBN 2-86480-685-1
