= List of Augustinian monasteries in France =

This is a list of Augustinian monasteries, extant and non-extant, in the present territory of France. It includes both canons and canonesses following the Rule of Saint Augustine, excluding the Premonstratensians, the Canons Regular of the Order of the Holy Cross (Crosiers), the Canons Regular of Saint Anthony (Hospital Brothers of Saint Anthony, or Antonines) and the Teutonic Order.

At different times these religious houses have formed various orders, congregations or groups, of which the main ones, as far as French monasteries are concerned, are the following:

- Arrouaisian Order
- Canons Regular of Mont Saint-Éloi
- Canons Regular of Hérival
- Congregation of Saint-Ruf (Rufinians)
- Canons Regular of Saint-Quentin of Beauvais
- Congregation of France (Génovéfains), centred on the Abbey of St Genevieve, Paris
- Congregation of the Great St Bernard
- Congregation of Chancelade
- Congregation of Abondance
- Congregation of Val-des-Écoliers
- Congregation of Pébrac
- group of La Roë
- group of Bourg-Achard
- group of Marbach
- Canons Regular of Our Saviour
- Congregation of Saint-Victor (Victorines)
- Canons Regular of the Immaculate Conception
- Congregation of Windesheim
- Canons Regular of Mary Mother of the Redeemer
- Canons Regular of the Mother of God

The present congregations are united in the Confederation of Canons Regular of St Augustine, established in 1959.

All religious houses in France were suppressed during the French Revolution, mostly in 1790–91. Some communities were revived, and many more new ones established, during the 19th century, but were forced to leave France by anti-clerical legislation during the 1880s (principally the Ferry Laws), and again in the first decades of the 20th century under the Association Act, 1901 (the Waldeck-Rousseau Law).

Dependent priories are not generally noted in this list, except for a few unusually significant ones.

== A ==
- Abondance Abbey, Abondance, Haute-Savoie
- Aiguevive Abbey, Faverolles-sur-Cher, Loir-et-Cher
- Airvault Abbey (Abbaye d'Airvault; Abbaye Saint-Pierre d'Airvault), Airvault, Deux-Sèvres
- Amiens, Somme:
  - Abbey of Saint-Acheul
  - Abbey of Saint-Martin-aux-Jumeaux
- Abbaye Toussaint (All Saints Abbey), Angers, Maine-et-Loire
- Arrouaise Abbey (Abbaye d'Arrouaise; Abbaye Saint-Nicolas d'Arrouaise), Le Transloy, Pas-de-Calais
- Aubrac Hospital (Domerie d'Aubrac), Saint-Chély-d'Aubrac, Aveyron
- Abbey of Saint-Ruf (Abbaye Saint-Ruf d'Avignon), Avignon, Vaucluse

== B ==
- La Barre Abbey (Abbaye de La Barre; Abbaye Notre-Dame de La Barre), Château-Thierry, Aisne
- Beaulieu Abbey, Ferques (Abbaye de Beaulieu), Ferques, Pas-de-Calais
- Abbey of St Quentin, Beauvais (Abbaye Saint-Quentin de Beauvais), Beauvais, Oise
- Belchamp Abbey (Abbaye de Belchamp; Abbaye Sainte-Trinité de Belchamp), Méhoncourt, Meurthe-et-Moselle
- Bourg-Achard Priory (Prieuré de Bourg-Achard), Bourg-Achard, Eure
- Abbey of St Ambrose, Bourges (Abbaye Saint-Ambroise (or Saint-Ambrois or Saint-Ambroix) de Bourges), Bourges, Cher

== C ==
- Abbey aux Dames otherwise Abbey of the Holy Trinity (Abbaye de la Trinité), Caen, Calvados
- Cassan Priory (Prieuré de Cassan; Prieuré Sainte-Marie de Cassan), Roujan, Hérault
- Cellefrouin Abbey (Abbaye de Cellefrouin; Abbaye Saint-Pierre de Cellefrouin), Cellefrouin, Charente
- Priory of St Cosmas, Chablis (Prieuré Saint-Cosme / Saint-Côme de Chablis), Chablis, Yonne
- All Saints Abbey (Abbaye de Toussaint de Châlons-sur-Marne), Châlons-sur-Marne, Marne
- Chamousey Abbey (Abbaye de Chamousey; Abbaye Saint-Pierre de Chaumousey), Chaumousey, Vosges
- St Peter's Abbey, Champagne (Abbaye Saint-Pierre de Champagne), Champagne, Ardèche
- Chancelade Abbey, Chancelade, Dordogne
- Chantoin Abbey (Abbaye de Chantoin), Clermont-Ferrand, Puy-de-Dôme
- Châtillon Abbey (Abbaye de Châtillon; Abbaye Notre-Dame de Châtillon), Châtillon-sur-Seine, Côte-d'Or
- Châtre Abbey (Abbaye de Châtre; Abbaye Notre-Dame-de-l'Assomption de Châtre), Saint-Brice, Charente
- Châtrices Abbey (Abbaye de Châtrices), Châtrices, Marne
- Abbey of Notre-Dame du Voeu, Cherbourg (Abbaye Notre-Dame du Vœu), Cherbourg, Manche
- Chocques Abbey (Abbaye de Chocques; Abbaye Saint-Jean-Baptiste de Chocques), Chocques, Pas-de-Calais
- Corneville Abbey (Abbaye de Corneville; Abbaye Notre-Dame de Corneville), Corneville-sur-Risle, Eure
- La Couronne Abbey (Abbaye de La Couronne; Abbaye royale Notre-Dame de La Couronne), La Couronne, Charente
- Cysoing Abbey (Abbaye de Cysoing; Abbaye Saint-Calixte de Cysoing), Cysoing, Nord

== D ==
- Daoulas Abbey (Abbaye de Daoulas; Abbaye Notre-Dame de Daoulas), Daoulas, Finistère

== E ==
- Épernay Abbey (Abbaye d'Épernay; Abbaye Saint-Martin d'Épernay), Épernay, Marne

== F ==
- Abbey of St John the Baptist, Falaise (Abbaye Saint-Jean-Baptiste de Falaise), Falaise, Calvados
- Fontenelles Abbey (Abbaye des Fontenelles; Abbaye Notre-Dame des Fontenelles), Saint-André-d'Ornay, Vendée
- Frigolet Abbey (Abbaye de Frigolet), Tarascon, Bouches-du-Rhône

== G ==
- Gercy Abbey, also known as Jarcy Abbey (Abbaye de Gercy or Jarcy; Abbaye Notre-Dame de Gercy or Jarcy), Varennes-Jarcy, Essonne
- Grandvaux Abbey (Abbaye du Grandvaux), Grande-Rivière, Jura
- Grosbot Abbey (Abbaye de Grosbot), Charras, Charente
- Guingamp Abbey (Abbaye de Guingamp; Abbaye Sainte-Croix de Guingamp), Guingamp, Côtes-d'Armor

== H ==
- Ham Abbey (Abbaye e Ham; Abbaye Notre-Dame de Ham), Ham, Somme
- Hénin-Liétard Abbey (Abbaye d'Hénin-Liétard; Abbaye Notre-Dame d'Hénin-Liétard), Hénin-Beaumont, Pas-de-Calais
- Hérival Priory (Prieuré d'Hérival), Le Val-d'Ajol, Vosges
- Hérivaux Abbey (Abbaye d'Hérivaux), Luzarches, Val-d'Oise

== J ==
- Jarcy, see Gercy
- Le Jard Abbey (Abbaye du Jard; Abbaye royale Saint-Jean-Baptiste du Jard), Voisenon, Seine-et-Marne

== L ==
- Lagrasse Abbey (Abbaye de Lagrasse; Abbaye Sainte-Marie de Lagrasse) Lagrasse, Aude (formerly Benedictine; Congrégation des Chanoines réguliers de la Mère de Dieu from 2004)
- Lesterps Abbey (Abbaye de Lesterps; Abbaye Saint-Pierre de Lesterps), Lesterps, Charente
- Lunéville Abbey, otherwise Abbey of Saint-Remi (Abbaye de Lunéville; Abbaye Saint-Remi de Lunéville), Lunéville, Meurthe-et-Moselle

== M ==
- Marast Priory (Prieuré de Marast; Prieuré Sainte-Marie-Madeleine de Marast), Marast, Haute-Saône
- Marbach Abbey (Abbaye de Marbach), Obermorschwihr and Eguisheim, Haut-Rhin
- Abbey of St Victor, Marseille, Bouches-du-Rhône
- Masevaux Abbey (Abbaye de Masevaux), Masevaux, Haut-Rhin
- Maubeuge Abbey (Abbaye de Maubeuge), Maubeuge, Nord
- Meillerie Priory (Prieuré de Meillerie), Meillerie, Haute-Savoie
- Mont-Saint-Éloi Abbey (Abbaye du Mont-Saint-Éloi-les-Arras), Mont-Saint-Éloi, Pas-de-Calais
- Montbenoît Abbey (Abbaye de Montbenoît), Montbenoît, Doubs
- Montmorel Abbey (Abbaye de Montmorel; Abbaye Notre-Dame de Montmorel), Poilley, Manche
- St Martin's Abbey, Nevers (Abbaye Saint-Martin de Nevers), Nevers, Nièvre

== N ==
- Nieul Abbey otherwise St Vincent's Abbey, Nieul-sur-l'Autise (Abbaye de Nieul; Abbaye Saint-Vincent de Nieul-sur-l'Autise), Nieul-sur-l'Autise, Vendée
- Notre-Dame, see La Barre, Châtillon, Cherbourg, Corneville, La Couronne, Daoulas, Gercy, Hénin-Liétard, Montmorel, Oigny, Paimpont, Perrigne, Poitiers: La Réau, Sablonceaux, Senlis, Vaas and Val des Écoliers
- Notre-Dame-de-l'Assomption, see Châtre
- Abbey of Saint-Barthélemy, Noyon (Abbaye de Noyon; Abbaye Saint-Barthélemy de Noyon), Noyon, Oise

== O ==
- Oigny Abbey (Abbaye d'oigny; Abbaye Notre-Dame d'Oigny), Oigny, Côte-d'Or

== P ==
- Paimpont Abbey (Abbaye de Paimpont; Abbaye Notre-Dame de Paimpont), Paimpont, Ille-et-Vilaine
- Paris:
  - Congrégation des Sacrés Coeurs de Marie et de Jésus de l'Adoration Perpétuelle, Rue de Picpus; during the French Revolution the buildings were occupied by the Maison Coignard, having served before the Revolution as the Priory of the Canonesses of St. Augustine of the Victory of Lepanto.
  - Priory of Saint-Martin-des-Champs
  - Abbey of St Genevieve
  - Abbey of St Victor
  - Abbey of Sainte-Périne de la Villette (Abbaye de Sainte-Périne de la Villette; also Sainte-Perrine), La Villette
- Pébrac Abbey (Abbaye de Pébrac), Pébrac, Haute-Loire
- Perrigne Abbey (Abbaye de Perrigne; Abbaye Notre-Dame de la Perrigne), Saint-Corneille, Sarthe
- Phalempin Abbey (Abbaye de Phalempin; Abbaye Saint-Christophe de Phalempin), Phalempin, Nord
- Plaimpied Abbey (Abbaye de Plaimpied; Abbaye Saint-Martin de Plaimpied), Plaimpied-Givaudins, Cher
- Priory of Le Plessis-Grimoult (Prieuré or Abbaye du Plessis-Grimoult), Le Plessis-Grimoult, Les Monts d'Aunay, Calvados
- Poitiers, Vienne:
  - Holy Cross Abbey (Abbaye Sainte-Croix de Poitiers)
  - Abbey of Saint-Hilaire-de-la-Celle (Abbaye Saint-Hilaire-de-la-Celle)
  - La Réau Abbey (Abbaye de La Réau; Abbaye Royale de Notre-Dame de La Réau), Saint-Martin-l'Ars, Vienne
- Pornic Abbey (Abbaye de Pornic; Abbey Sainte-Marie de Pornic), Sainte-Marie-sur-Mer, Pornic, Loire-Atlantique

== R ==
- La Réau Abbey, see Poitiers
- Priory of St Cosmas, otherwise Ronsard's Priory (Prieuré Saint-Cosme de Tours also Saint-Cô; Prieuré Ronsard), La Riche, Indre-et-Loire
- Abbey of St Denis, Reims (Abbaye de Saint-Denis de Reims), Reims, Marne
- La Roë Abbey (Abbaye de la Roë), La Roë, Mayenne

== S ==
- Saint-Acheul, see Amiens
- Saint-Ambroise, see Bourges
- Saint-Barthélemy, see Noyon
- Saint-Calixte, see Cysoing
- Saint-Christophe, see Phalempin
- Saint-Cosme or Saint-Côme, see Chablis and La Riche
- Sainte-Croix, see Poitiers
- Saint-Denis, see Reims
- Sainte-Geneviève, see Paris
- Saint-Hilaire-de-la-Celle, see Poitiers
- Saint-Jean-des-Vignes, see Soissons
- Saint-Jean-Baptiste, see Chocques, Falaise, Le Jard and Valenciennes
- Saint-Louis, see Vernon
- Saint-Loup, see Troyes
- Sainte-Marie, see Lagrasse and Pornic; see also Notre-Dame
- Sainte-Marie-Madeleine, see Marast
- Saint-Martin, see Épernay, Nevers and Plaimpied
- Saint-Martin-aux-Jumeaux, see Amiens
- Saint-Martin-des-Champs, see Paris
- Saint-Michel de Grandmont, see Saint-Privat
- Saint-Nicolas, see Arrouaise
- Sainte-Périne, see Paris
- Saint-Pierre, see Airvault, Cellefrouin, Chamousey, Champagne, Lesterps and Vertheuil
- Saint-Quentin, see Beauvais
- Saint-Remi, see Lunéville
- Saint-Ruf, see Avignon and Valence
- Sainte-Trinité, see Belchamp and Caen
- Saint-Victor, see Marseille and Paris
- Saint-Vincent, see Nieul-sur-l'Autise and Senlis

- Sablonceaux Abbey (Abbaye de Sablonceaux; Abbaye Notre-Dame de Sablonceaux), Sablonceaux, Charente-Maritime
- Saint-Pierremont Abbey (Abbaye de Saint-Pierremont), Avril, Meurthe-et-Moselle
- Priory of Saint-Michel de Grandmont (Prieuré Saint-Michel de Grandmont), Saint-Privat, Hérault
- Senlis, Oise:
  - Abbey of Notre-Dame de la Victoire
  - Abbey of St Vincent
- Serrabone Priory (Prieuré de Serrabone), Boule-d'Amont, Pyrénées-Orientales
- Abbey of Saint-Jean-des-Vignes, Soissons (Abbaye Saint-Jean-des-Vignes de Soissons), Soissons, Aisne

== T ==
- Toulouse, Haute-Garonne:
  - Augustinian convent (Couvent des Augustins de Toulouse)
  - Abbey of Saint-Sernin (Abbaye Saint-Sernin de Toulouse)
- Toussaint(s), see Angers and Châlons-sur-Marne
- Abbey of Saint-Loup, Troyes (Abbaye Saint-Loup de Troyes), Troyes, Aube

== V ==
- Vaas Abbey (Abbaye de Vaas; Abbaye Notre-Dame de Vaas), Vaas, Sarthe
- Abbey of Saint-Ruf, Valence, Drôme
- Abbey of St John the Baptist, Valenciennes (Abbaye Saint-Jean-Baptiste de Valenciennes), Valenciennes, Nord
- Abbey of Val des Écoliers (Abbaye Notre-Dame du Val des Écoliers), Verbiesles, Haute-Marne
- Abbey of Saint-Louis, Vernon (Abbaye Saint-Louis de Vernon), Vernon, Eure
- Abbey of St Peter, Vertheuil (Abbaye Saint-Pierre de Vertheuil), Vertheuil, Gironde

== See also ==
- List of Christian monasteries in France
- List of Benedictine monasteries in France
- List of Carthusian monasteries § France
- List of Cistercian monasteries in France
- List of Premonstratensian monasteries in France
