= List of Christian monasteries in France =

This is a list of Christian monasteries and religious houses in France, both extant and non-extant, and for either men or women (or both).

== Christian religious houses arranged by order ==
=== Augustinians ===
- see List of Augustinian monasteries in France

=== Benedictines ===
(including Cluniacs):

- see List of Benedictine monasteries in France

=== Carmelites ===
- Carmel of Lisieux
- Carmelite convent, Nantes, Loire-Atlantique
- Carmelite convent, Faubourg Saint-Jacques, otherwise the Carmel de l'Incarnation, Paris
- Carmel de la Place Maubert, Paris

=== Carthusians ===
- see List of Carthusian monasteries in France

=== Cistercians ===
(including Trappists):

- see List of Cistercian monasteries in France

=== Dominicans ===
- Convent of Sainte Marie de la Tourette (Couvent Sainte-Marie de La Tourette), friars (Éveux, Rhône)

=== Franciscans ===
- Capuchin Friary, Crest (Monastère des Capucins de Crest) Capuchin friars, (Crest, Drôme)
- Convent of Poor Clares, Gravelines

=== Premonstratensians ===
- see List of Premonstratensian monasteries in France

== See also ==
- List of Carolingian monasteries
- List of Imperial abbeys
