= Frigolet Abbey =

Abbey in Bouches-du-Rhône, France

Coordinates: 43°51′30″N 4°43′39″E

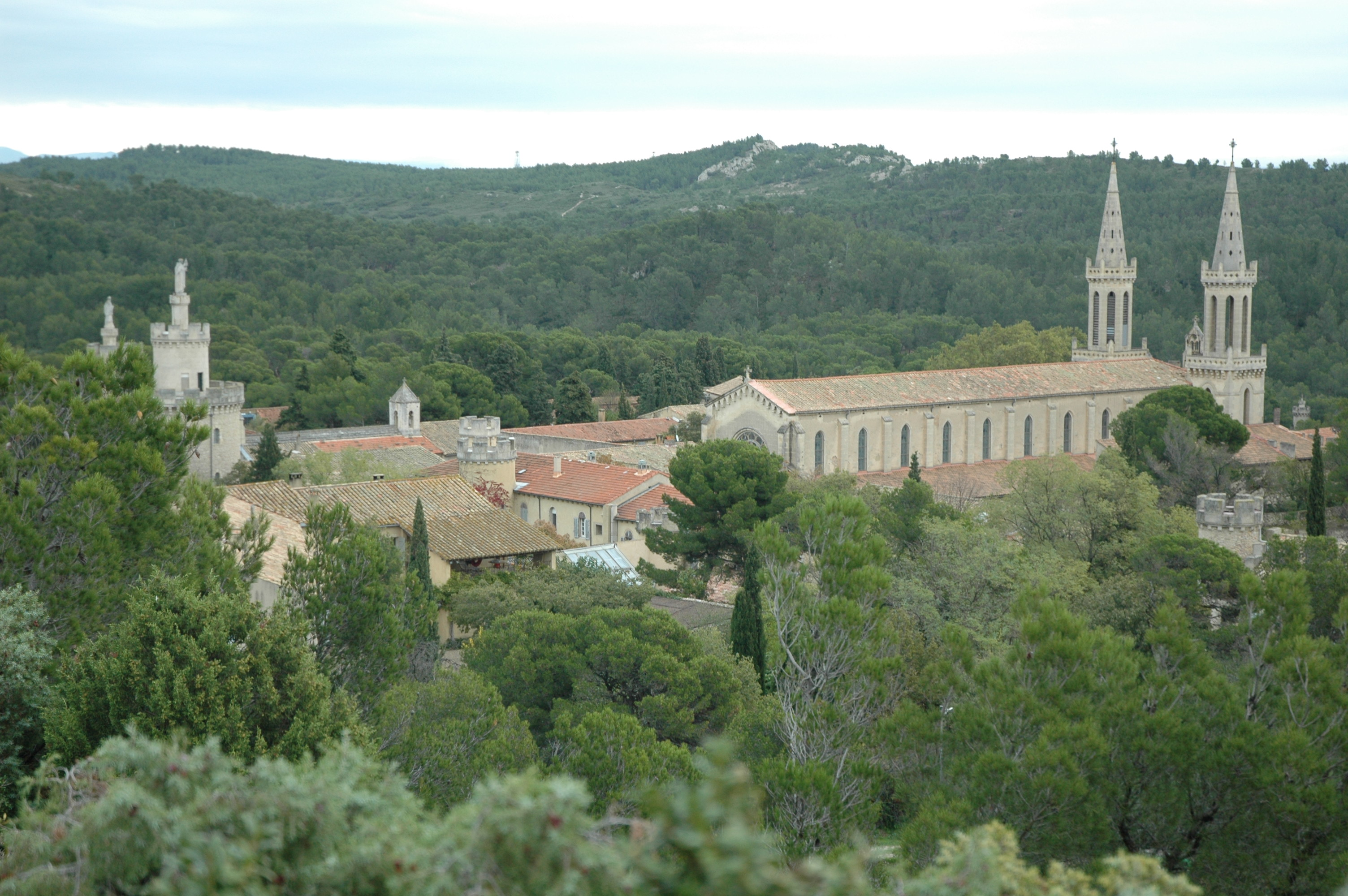
Frigolet Abbey

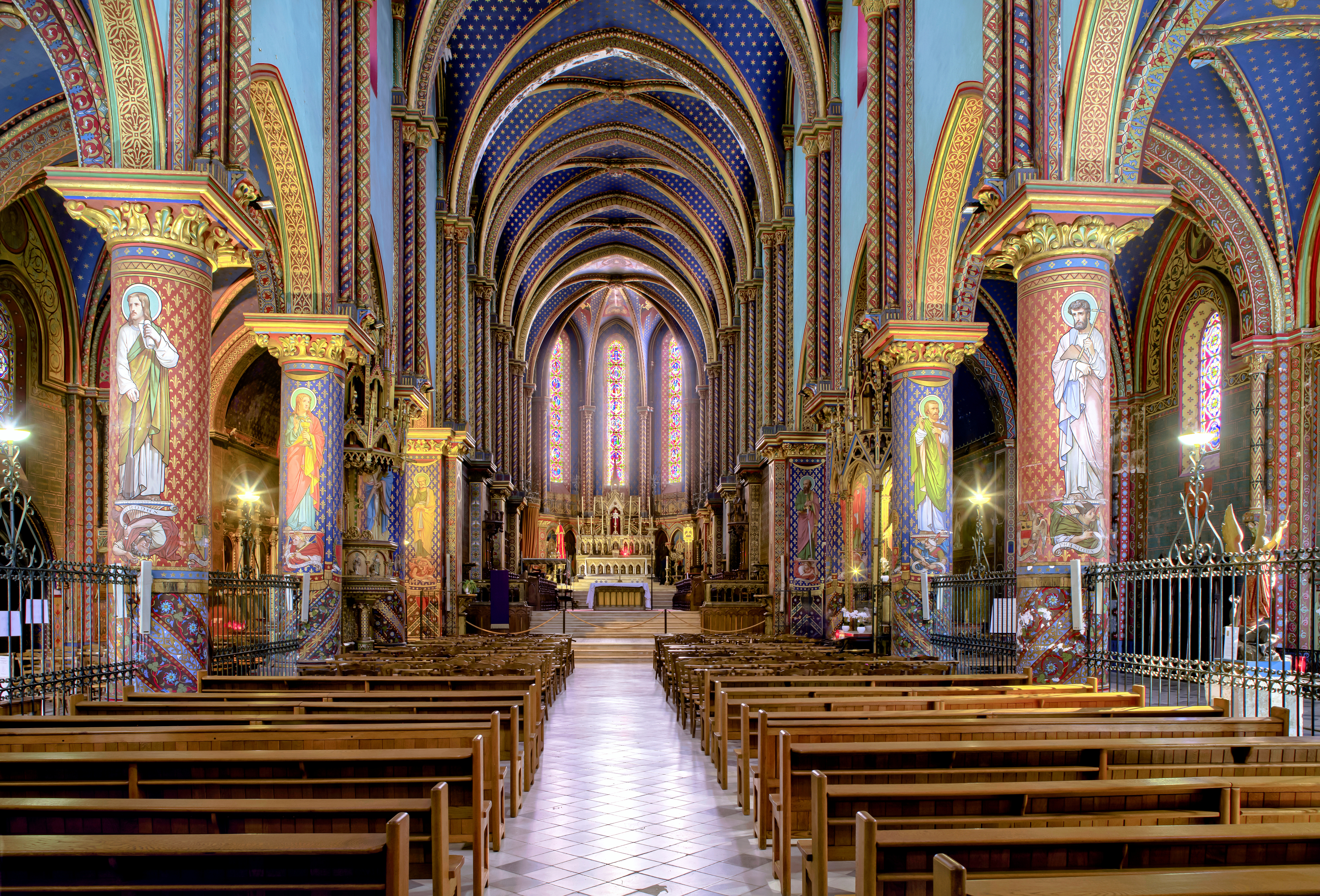
Nave of the abbey church.

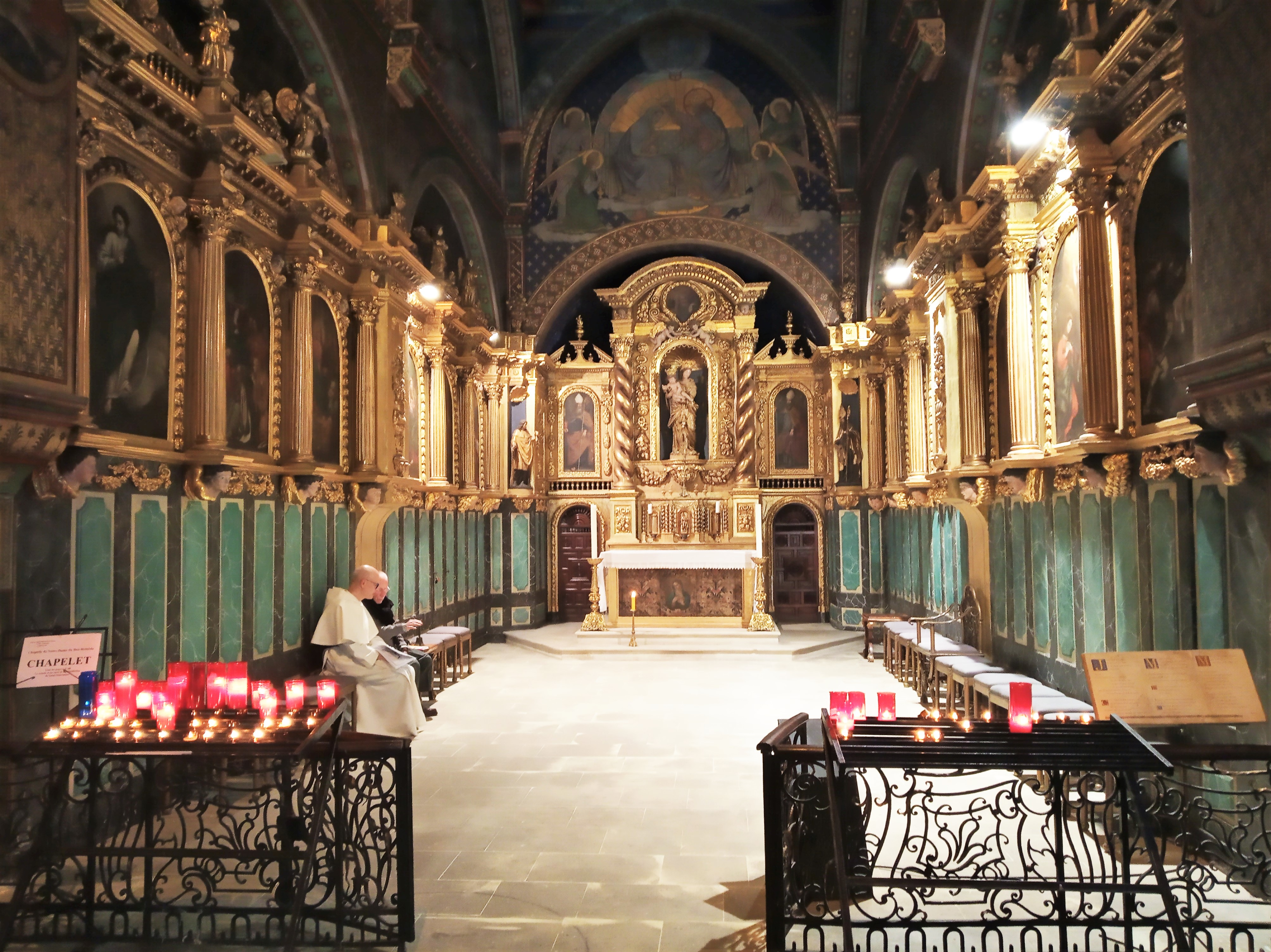
Chapel of Our Lady of Good Remedy in the abbey church. The baroque chapel and decoration was funded by the former Queen of France, Anne of Austria in 1638. Pope Pius IX crowned the image by a formal decree in 1869.

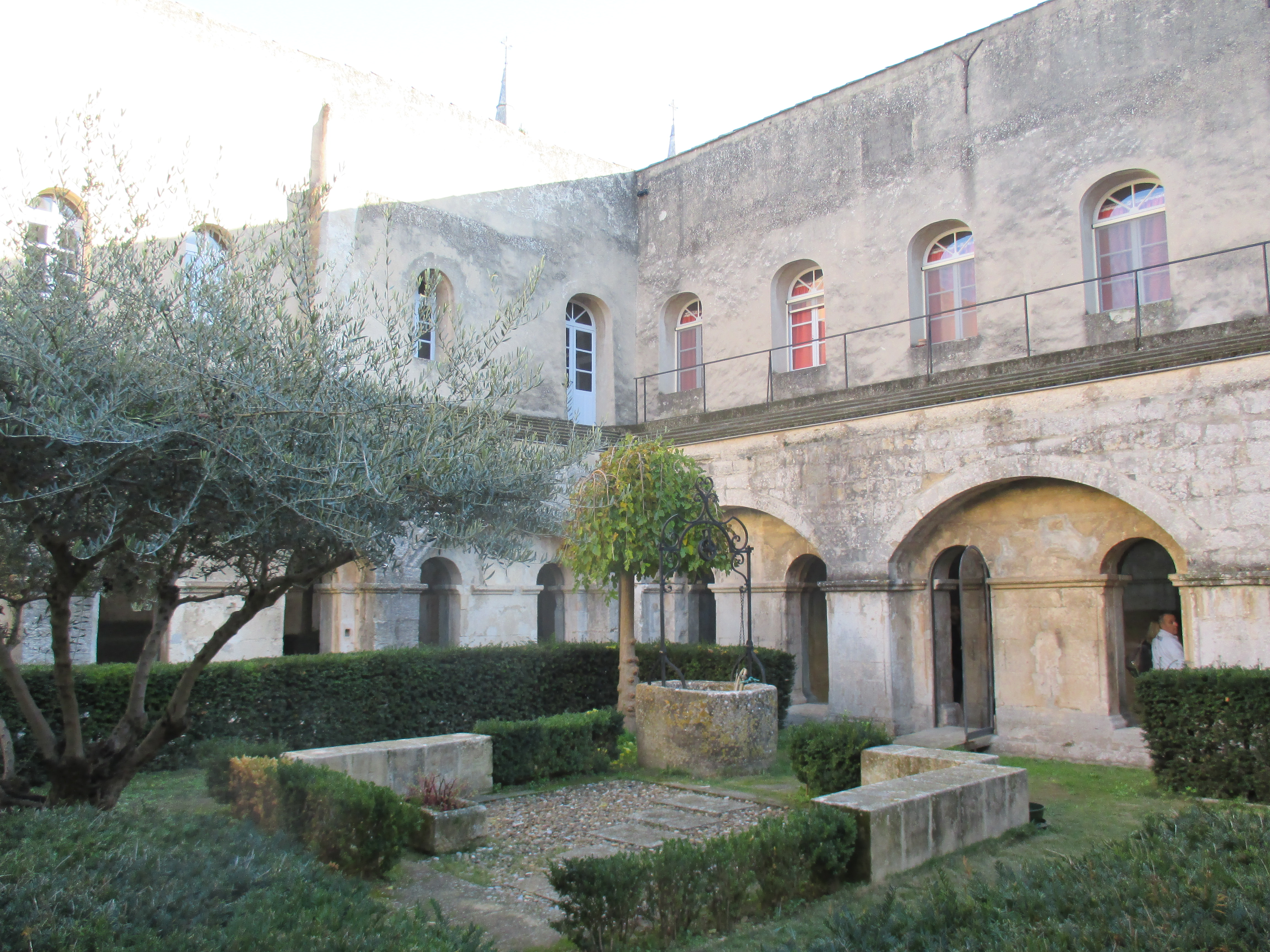
Cloister

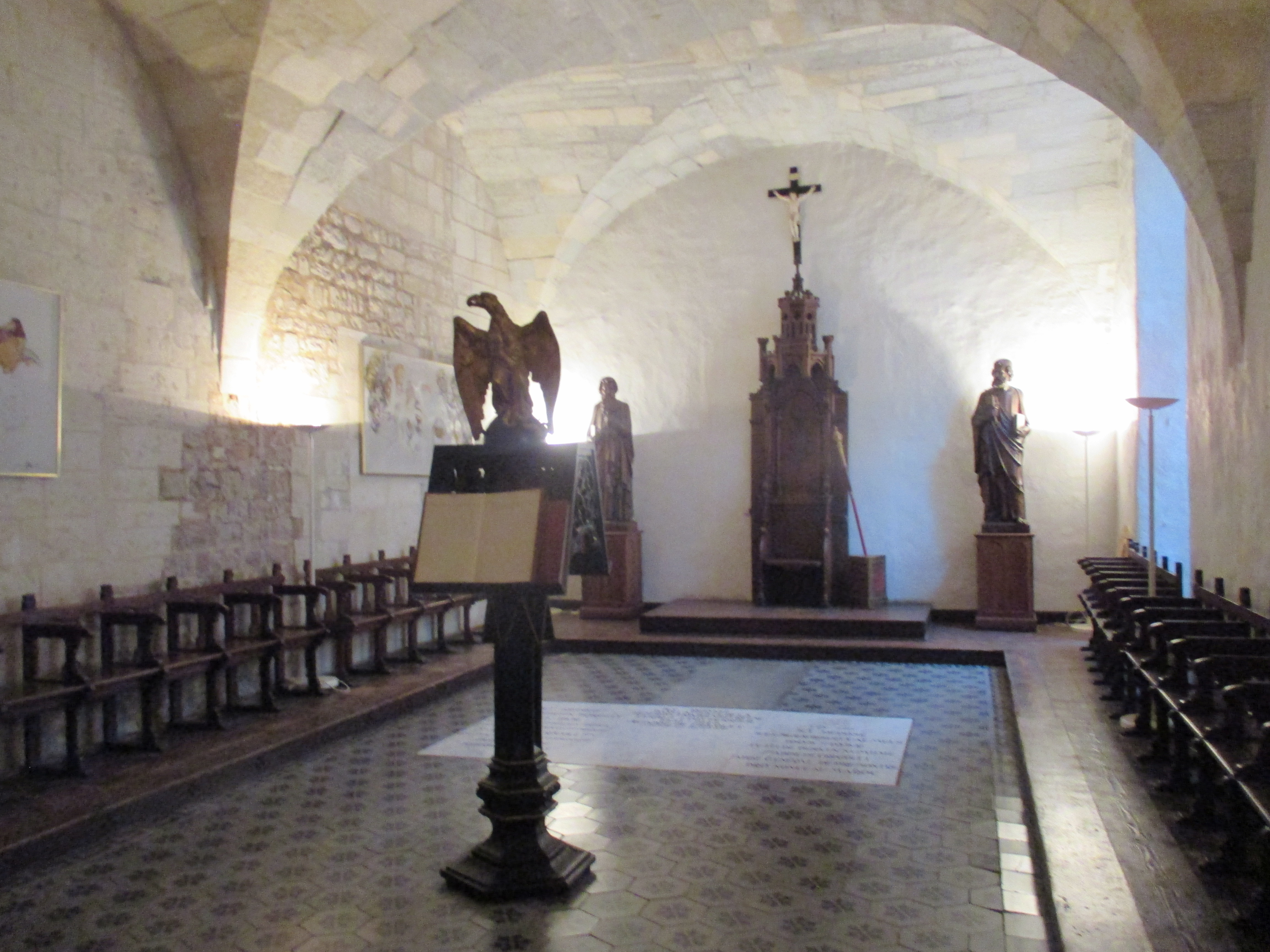
Chapter house

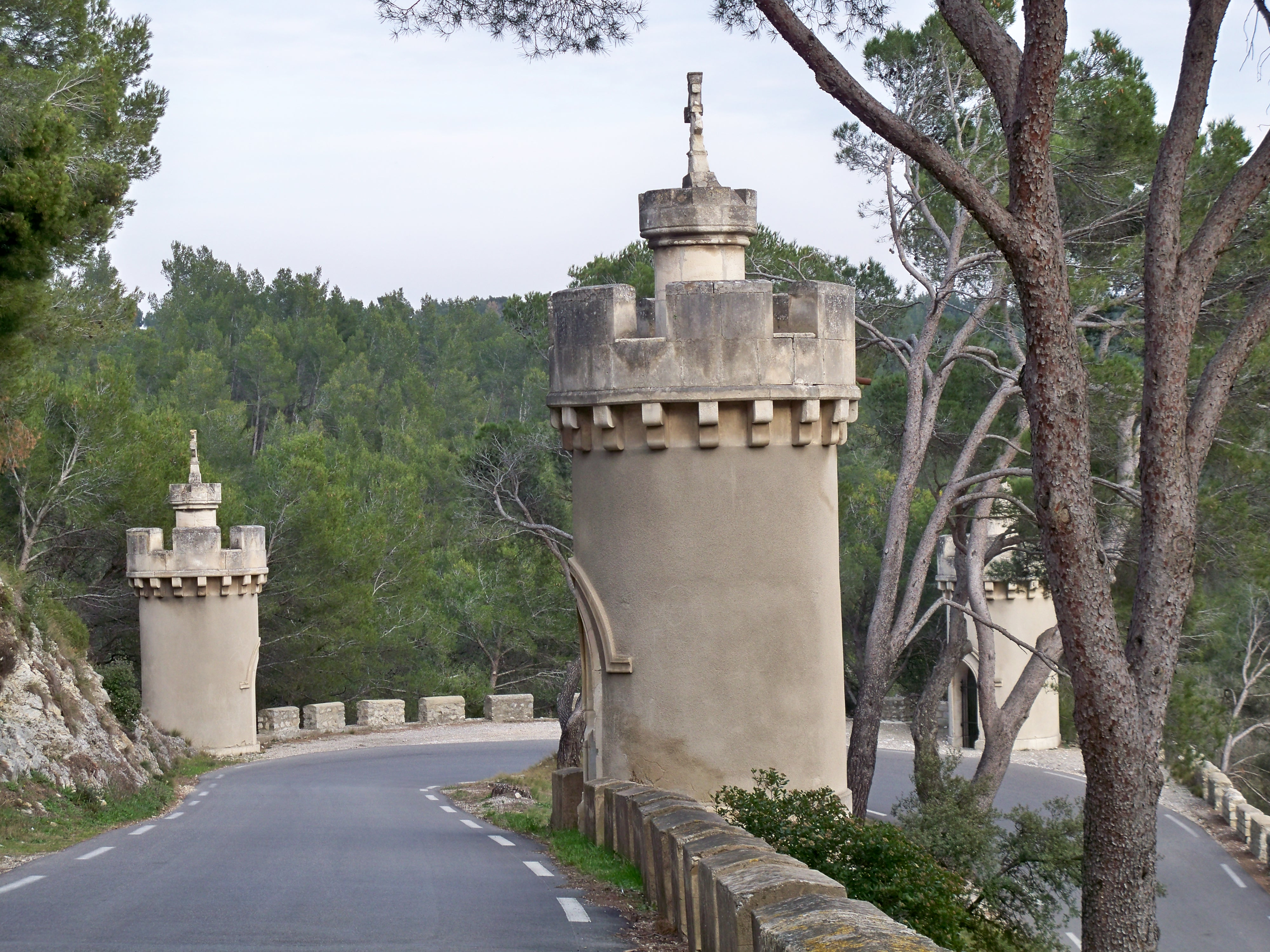
Stations of the Cross

Frigolet Abbey (French: Abbaye Saint-Michel de Frigolet; Occitan: Abadiá de Frigolet) is a grand Premonstratensian monastery complex in Southern France. It is located in the territorial commune of Tarascon, in the region of the Montagnette, the parishes of which are served by the canons of the monastery. It was originally associated with the Order of Saint Benedict.

== Communities ==
The monastery, dedicated to Saint Michael, was founded about 960 at Frigolet by Conrad I of Burgundy on one of the numerous hills which lie between Tarascon and Avignon. It was initially occupied by Benedictine monks from Montmajour Abbey.

By the 12th century, the abbey was home to a community of Canons regular. A document from 1133 lists the prior of the canons as Guillaume of Loubières. The chapel of Our Lady of Good Remedy dates from this period. The canonical Augustinian community lasted until 1480, when the canons petitioned the Holy See to suppress the monastery. This request was granted by Pope Sixtus IV, at which time the monastery was abandoned. The chapel, however, remained a popular pilgrimage site.

In 1647, the Order of Saint Jerome were given possession of the derelict monastery. They worked to restore it, at the same time expanding the complex, enlarging the choir and sacristy, and erecting a chapter house. The community did not stay long, however, and were replaced in 1661 by the Discalced Augustinians. The friars of this order continued the work of the Hieronymites, but also did pastoral care in the surrounding region, providing support to the local clergy.

At the time of the French Revolution, it was suppressed and sold by the French First Republic.

== The Order of Præmonstratensians ==
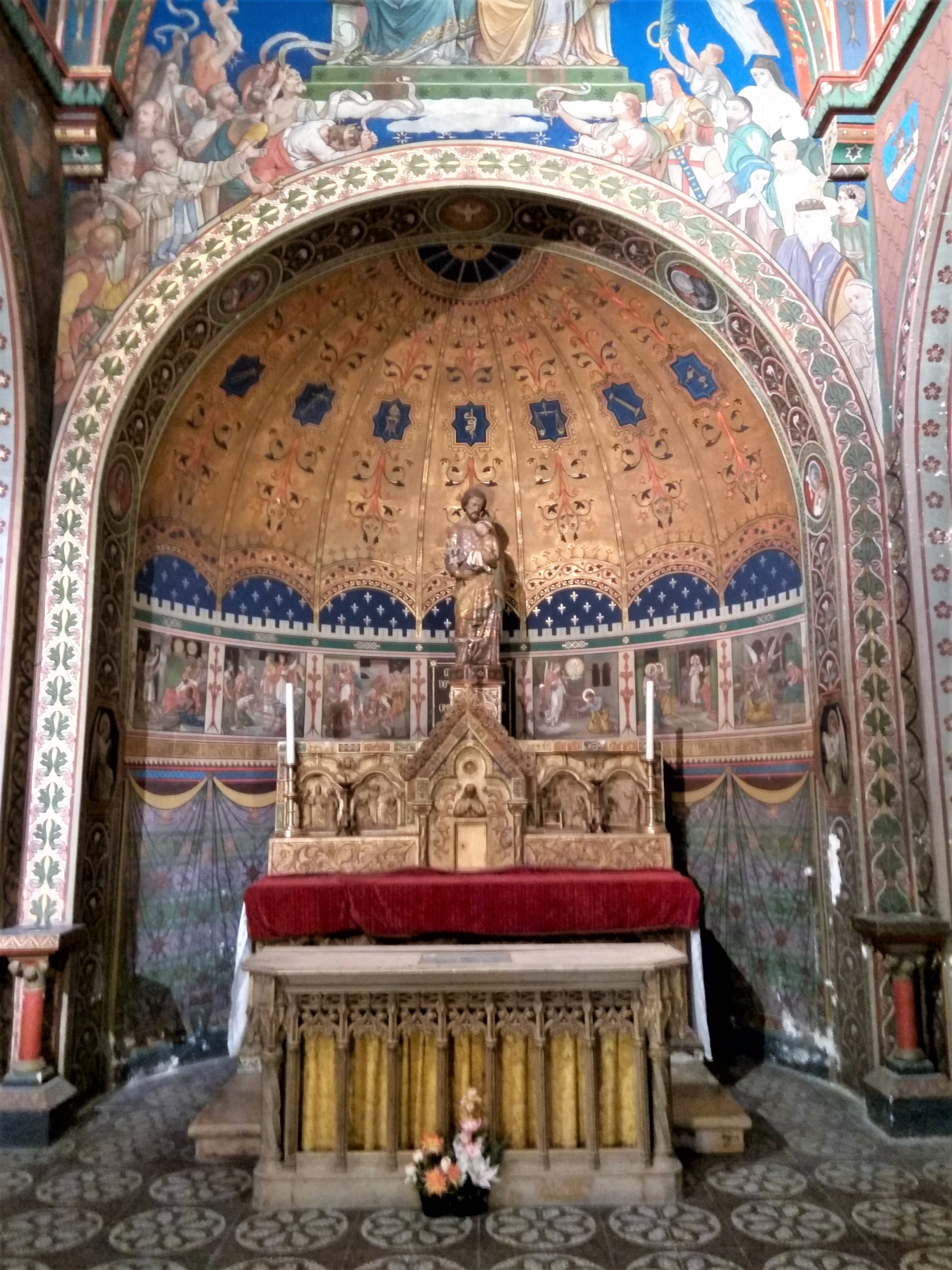
The venerated patriarchal image of Saint Joseph, crowned by Pope Pius IX by pontifical decree on 30 September 1874.

After the Revolution it changed hands frequently, eventually acquired by a priest, Edmund Boulbon who purchased it from another priest from Cucuron, Toussaint de l’Estrac, who was a chaplain from the Convent of Our Lady of Visitation in Vaucluse, Avignon.

Edmund Boulbon (born 14 January 1817) entered the La Trappe Abbey at Bricquebec in 1850, wishing to lead a more dedicated religious life. Acting on the advice of the Trappist superiors, he left the abbey and undertook the restoration of the Order of Norbert of Xanten. On June 6, the feast day of Saint Norbert, Boulbon received the white habit of the Premonstratensians from the hands of the Bishop of Soissons, Paul-Armand de Cardon de Garsignies at Prémontré Abbey.

With the consent of Archbishop of Aix, Georges-Claude-Louis-Pie Chalandon, Boulbon took possession of Frigolet and, having admitted several novices, commenced community life there. He erected a church in honour of the Blessed Virgin Mary, which was solemnly consecrated on 6 October 1866. The monastery was canonically erected as a priory on 28 August 1868 by a pontifical decree, and as an abbey in September 1869, with Boulbon as its first abbot.

On 8 November 1880, under the French anti-clerical laws, the Abbey of Frigolet was seized and the monks expelled. Eventually, however, they were permitted to return.

Boulbon died on 2 March 1883. His successor, Paulinus Boniface, named abbot on 10 June 1883, undid by poor administration the work begun by Boulbon. After a canonical visitation by Archbishop of Aix, François Xavier Gouthe-Soulard, Paulinus was deposed, and the direction of the abbey entrusted to Denis Bonnefoy.

Up to this time, Frigolet Abbey with the priories it had founded had formed, as it were, a separate congregation with an organization of its own, having no connection with the other abbeys or the General Chapter of the Premonstratensian order. This state of affairs was changed by a decree of the Roman Curia, dated 17 September 1898, when the congregation of Frigolet was incorporated into the order.

Denis Bonnefoy, who was made abbot on 21 March 1899, died on 20 September of the same year. The canons of Frigolet then chose for their abbot Godfrey Madelaine, then prior of Mondaye Abbey, Calvados, the author of L'histoire de S. Norbert and other books. Under his administration, Frigolet Abbey sent missionaries to Madagascar, and founded priories at Conques and Étoile (now in Authon, Loir-et-Cher) in France, and at Storrington and Bedworth in England. Meanwhile, the French Republic had framed new laws against all religious institutes, and on 5 April 1903 the canons, again expelled from their abbey, took refuge either in Belgium, in Norbertine abbey in Leffe, or in the priory at Storrington in England.

The community at Leffe suffered severely from the German occupation during World War I: some were killed, and the rest were driven into further exile. Frigolet was reoccupied by the Premonstratensians in 1923 and remains in operation, although the communities at Leffe and Storrington also continued.

The abbot of Frigolet from 1946 was P. Norbert Calmels, later distinguished as the Abbot-General of the Premonstratensian order from 1961 to 1981, during which time he participated in the Second Vatican Council.

== Pontifical approbations ==
- Pope Pius IX was favorable towards the Frigolet abbey through the following approbations:
  - Approved the restoration project of the monastery via a papal audience granted to the Bishop of Soissons, Paul—Armand de Cardon de Garsignies on 4 December 1856.
  - Raised the monastery to the rank of a fraternal priory via his papal bull Domus Princeps which he signed and notarized on 28 August 1868.
  - Raised the status of the priory to the rank of an Abbey, providing the creation of its first abbot via a papal brief signed on 6 June 1869, which appointed Edmund Boulbon as the first abbot in September 1869.
  - Granted a canonical coronation towards the venerated image of "Our Lady of Good Remedy" via the Bishop of Puy, Pierre le Breton on 31 August 1869. The 12th—century original chapel of the Marian image was reconstructed with baroque ornamentation under the benefactress and patronage of the former Queen of France, Anne of Austria.
  - Granted a canonical coronation, assigned to Friar Gabriel Mollevaut, towards a venerated image of Saint Joseph on 30 September 1874, now venerated in its own chapel within the abbey.
- Pope John Paul II issued a pontifical decree titled Sacra illa ædes that raised one of its structures to the status of a minor basilica on 12 June 1984.
