= Oigny, Côte-d'Or =

Oigny
- Commune
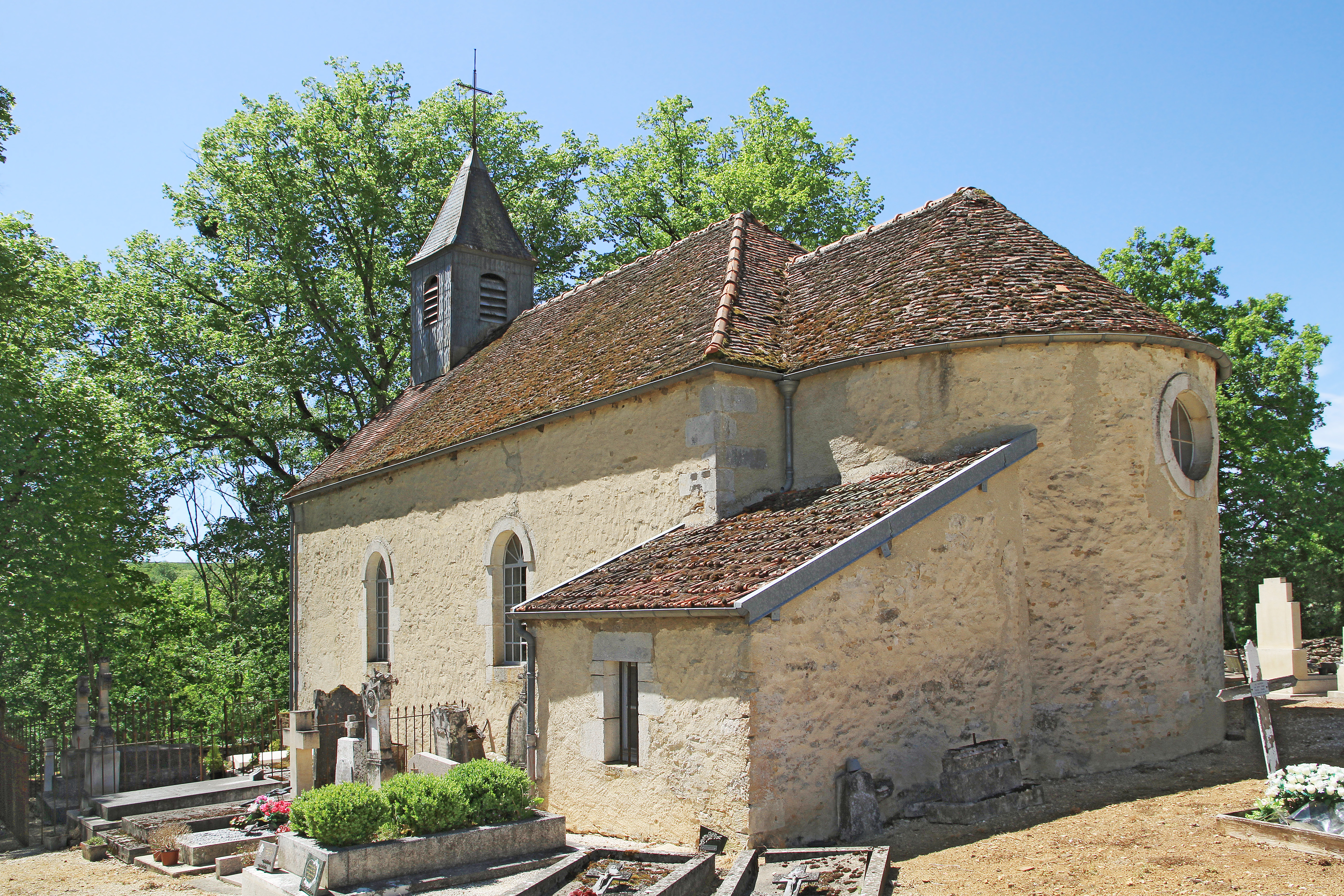
- The church in Oigny
- Location of Oigny
- Location within France Location within Bourgogne-Franche-Comté
- Coordinates: 47°34′37″N 4°43′00″E
- Country: France
- Region: Bourgogne-Franche-Comté
- Department: Côte-d'Or
- Arrondissement: Montbard
- Canton: Châtillon-sur-Seine
- Intercommunality: Pays Châtillonnais

Government
  - Mayor (2020–2026): Olivier Gallien
- Area^{1}: 14.84 km^{2} (5.73 sq mi)
- Elevation: 480 m (1,570 ft)
- Highest elevation: 467 m (1,532 ft)
- Lowest elevation: 343 m (1,125 ft)
- Population (2023): 39
  - Density: 2.6/km^{2} (6.8/sq mi)
- Time zone: UTC+01:00 (CET)
  - Summer (DST): UTC+02:00 (CEST)
- INSEE/Postal code: 21466 /21450
- ^{1} French Land Register data, which excludes lakes, ponds, glaciers > 1 km^{2} (0.386 sq mi or 247 acres) and river estuaries.

Oigny (French pronunciation: [waɲi]) is a commune in the Côte-d'Or department in eastern France.

== Population ==
Historical population
Year	Pop.	±% p.a.
1968	40	—
1975	42	+0.70%
1982	36	−2.18%
1990	30	−2.25%
1999	29	−0.38%
2007	35	+2.38%
2012	37	+1.12%
2017	36	−0.55%
2023	39	+1.34%
Source: INSEE

== See also ==
- Communes of the Côte-d'Or department
