= Lamorville =

- Commune
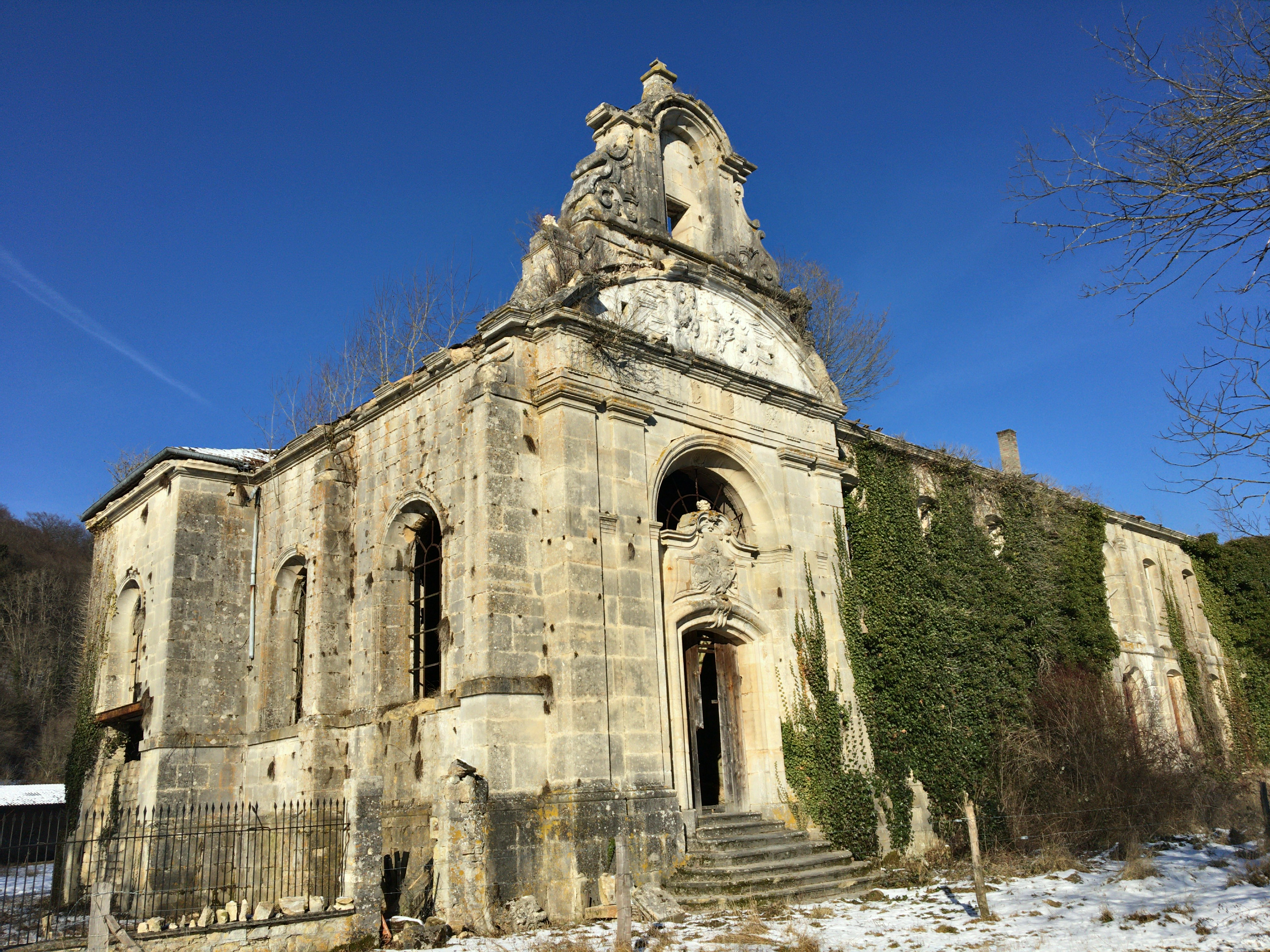
- The Etanche abbey in Lamorville

- Coat of arms
- Location of Lamorville
- Location within France Location within Grand Est
- Coordinates: 48°57′36″N 5°34′44″E
- Country: France
- Region: Grand Est
- Department: Meuse
- Arrondissement: Commercy
- Canton: Saint-Mihiel
- Intercommunality: Côtes de Meuse - Woëvre

Government
  - Mayor (2020–2026): Jean-Luc Lemercier
- Area^{1}: 34.93 km^{2} (13.49 sq mi)
- Elevation: 247 m (810 ft)
- Highest elevation: 408 m (1,339 ft)
- Lowest elevation: 222 m (728 ft)
- Population (2023): 269
  - Density: 7.70/km^{2} (19.9/sq mi)
- Time zone: UTC+01:00 (CET)
  - Summer (DST): UTC+02:00 (CEST)
- INSEE/Postal code: 55274 /55300
- ^{1} French Land Register data, which excludes lakes, ponds, glaciers > 1 km^{2} (0.386 sq mi or 247 acres) and river estuaries.

Lamorville is a commune in the Meuse department in Grand Est in north-eastern France. In January 1973, it absorbed the former communes Deuxnouds-aux-Bois, Lavignéville and Spada.

== See also ==
- L'Étanche Abbey, located near the village of Deuxnouds-aux-Bois, on the territory of the commune
- Communes of the Meuse department
- Parc naturel régional de Lorraine
