= Marcheroux Abbey =

Premonstratensian abbey in Picardy, France

Coordinates: 49°18′20″N 2°01′42″E

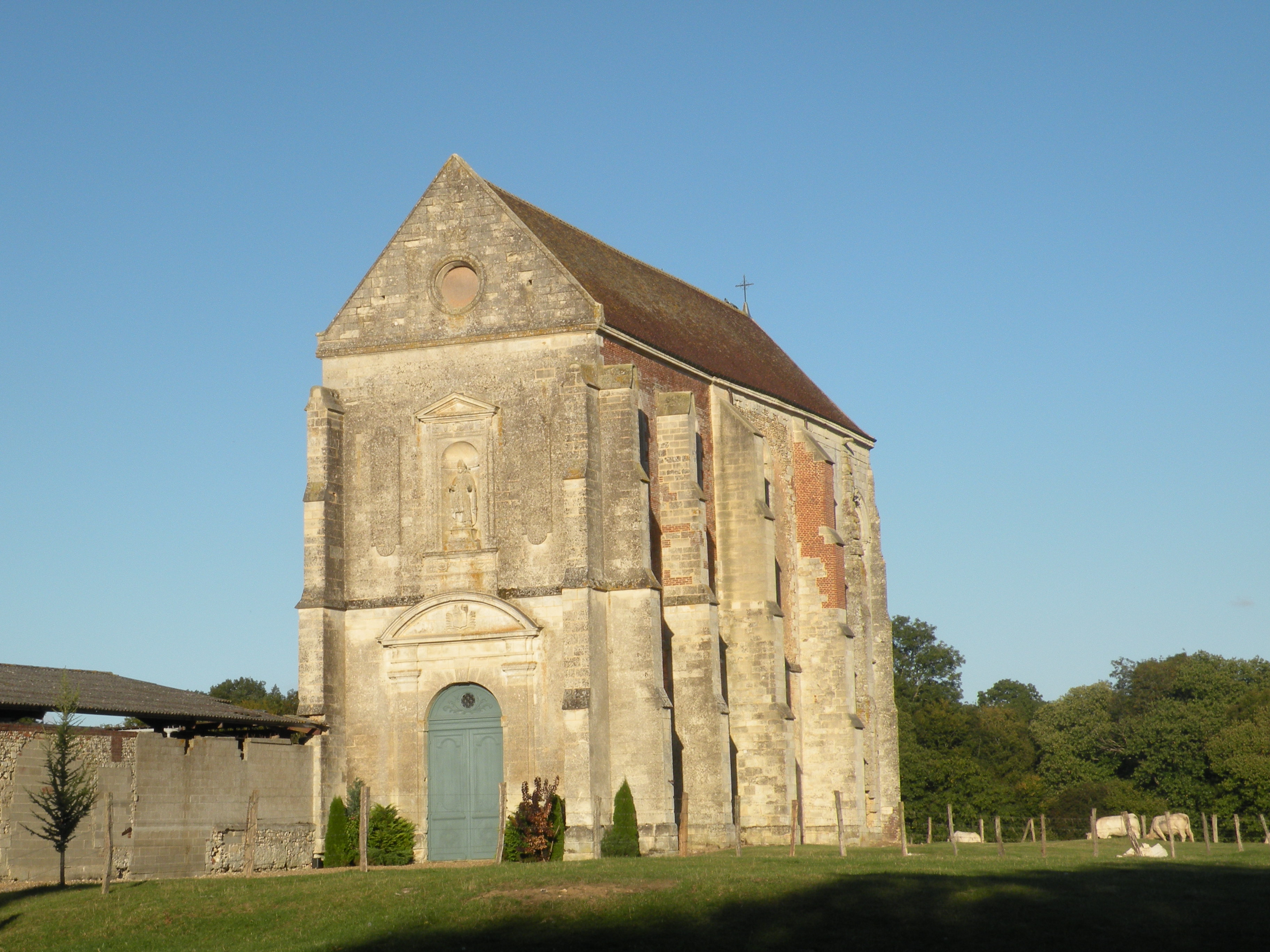
Former church, Marcheroux Abbey

Marcheroux Abbey (French: Abbaye de Marcheroux or Abbaye Saint-Nicolas-de-Marcheroux; Latin: Marchasium Radulphi) is a former Premonstratensian monastery dedicated in honour of Saint Nicholas in Beaumont-les-Nonains in Les Hauts-Talican south of Beauvais, Picardy, France. The site has been registered as a monument historique since 1995.

== History ==
In 1122 Ulric, a companion of the founder of the Premonstratensian Order, Saint Norbert of Xanten, established in Jouy-la-Grange in the present Beaumont-les-Nonains a religious community called Saint-Nicolas-en-Thelle. In or around 1145 the landowner Ansculphe de Sénots made them a gift of land in Marcheroux, less than 5 kilometres away, to which the abbey moved shortly afterwards. In 1147 Pope Eugene III confirmed the foundation. The monastery was subordinate to the abbey of Saint-Josse de Dommartin in Tortefontaine (now in Pas-de-Calais). Ansculphe de Sénots also gave the abbey a farm at Beaumont, where Ulric established a nunnery, whence the present name of Beaumont-les-Nonains ("nonains" is the Old French word for "nuns"). The farm was destroyed in 1192 but there was still apparently a community of nuns there in the mid-13th century.

Around 1180 Marcheroux founded a daughter house, Abbecourt Abbey, in the present Yvelines. Marcheroux never became wealthy: it had the revenues of a single parish church. It also suffered some misfortunes. At the end of the 12th and beginning of the 13th centuries it was laid waste by a certain Guyard, a descendant of Ansculphe. It was destroyed again in about 1430 by English troops and remained in ruins until the beginning of the 16th century. A new abbey church was dedicated in 1536 but collapsed in 1615.

In 1668 the abbey joined the reformist movement initiated some decades earlier by Servais de Lairuelz in an attempt to regain the earlier discipline of the order. In 1727 it fell into the hands of commendatory abbots. By the time of the French Revolution in 1791, when the monastery was suppressed and its assets sold, only seven canons remained. In the 19th century the abbey church, the vaulting of which had been destroyed, was used as a barn.

== Remains ==
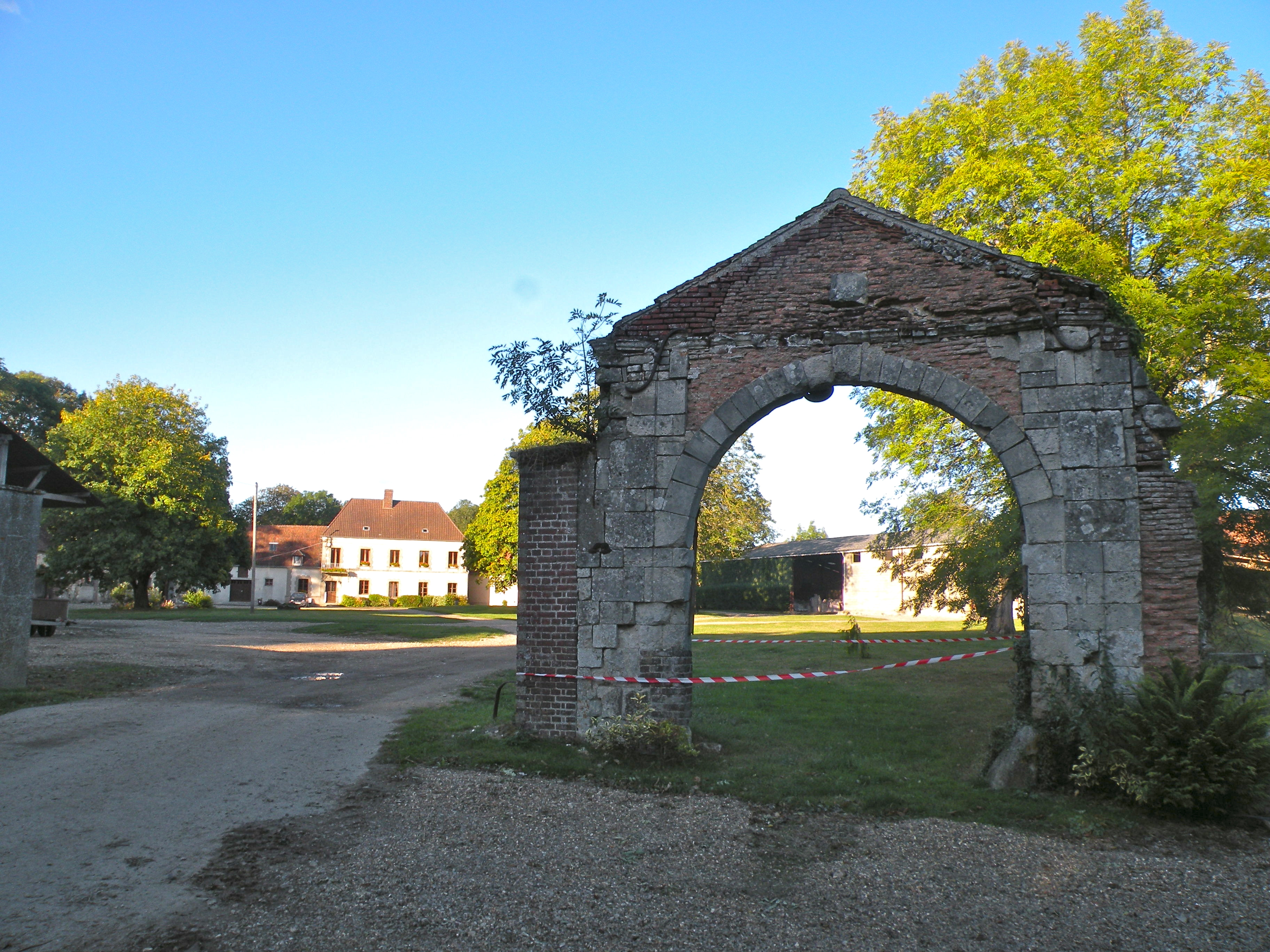
Gateway

The abbey church survives and retains parts of the 13th-century choir and apse. The nave and west front date from the rebuilding of around 1710. The 17th-century conventual building and the 18th-century gateway are also still extant.

Parts of the fabric and fittings of the abbey church are now in other local parish churches. Sixteen choir stalls, backed by two altars and retables with a tabernacle are in the parish church of La Houssoye. One of the retables is decorated with a relief depicting Saint Nicholas and the three children in the salt barrel. The group is dated 1716 in an inscription. The parish church of Montjavoult contains two 18th-century altar claddings depicting the Presentation of Jesus at the Temple.

== Bibliography ==
- A. Sabatier: Abbaye de Marcheroux de l'ordre des Prémontrés et de la filiation de Saint-Josse-aux-Bois ou Dommartin, in: Mémoires de la Société académique d'archéologie, sciences et arts du département de l'Oise, vol. 6 (1865), pp. 614–623 (online version)
- Florence Charpentier and Xavier Daugy: Sur le Chemin des abbayes de Picardie: Histoire des abbayes picardes des origines à nos jours, Amiens: Encrage, coll. "Hier", September 2008, pp. 135–136 ISBN 9782911576836
