= Valsery Abbey =

Abbey in Aisne, France

Coordinates: 49.3208°N 3.1619°E

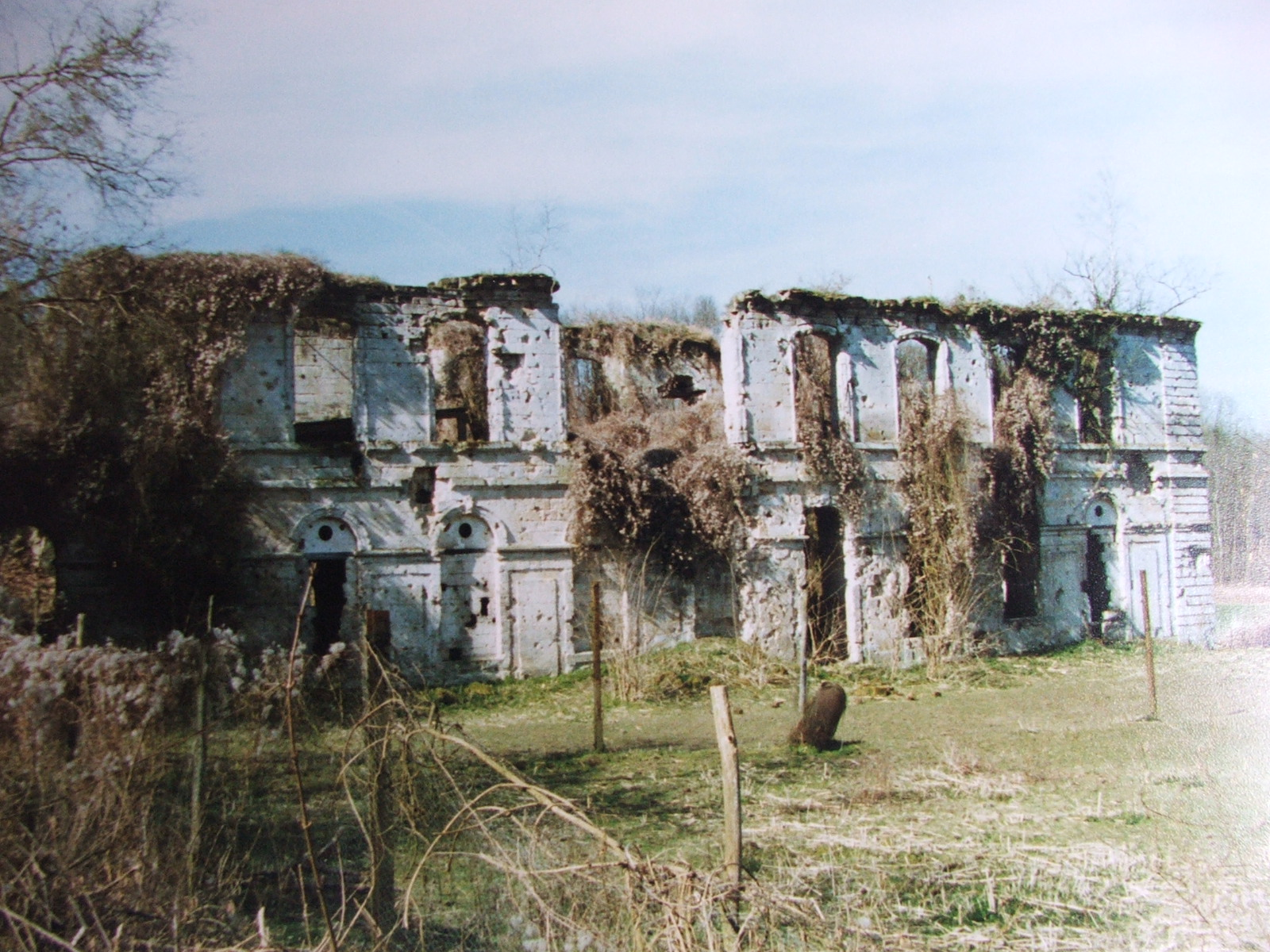
Valsery Abbey ruins

Valsery Abbey (French: Abbaye de Valsery; Abbaye Notre-Dame de Valsery) is a former Premonstratensian abbey located in Cœuvres-et-Valsery, Aisne, France. It was founded in 1124 near the Forest of Retz, which the Premonstratensian canons doubtless helped to clear.

Whatever buildings remained of the abbey after the Revolution, when all monastic houses in France were suppressed, were ruined during World War I and abandoned. The site was declared a historic monument site in 1986, since when much investigation and restoration has taken place.

The only walls still standing belong to the dormitories of the canons and the chapter house, which is the focus of the site with its polychrome decoration and floor tiling. The rest of the site is buried under 2 meters of earth. The remains of the abbey church and cloister were located during the first surveys carried out in the late 1990s.

The abbey owned a town house or hostel in Soissons, of which only the cellars remain today. This was also classified as an historical monument in 1986.

Since 1996, the abbey remains have belonged to the Association de Restauration de l'Abbaye de Valsery, established on the site, which is linked to the Association Rempart. Since April 2013, volunteers have been meeting two Saturdays a month to restore the site and organize visits.

== Sources ==
- Fédération des sociétés d'histoire et d'archéologie de l'Aisne: Abbaye de Valsery
