= Avril, Meurthe-et-Moselle =

Avril
- Commune
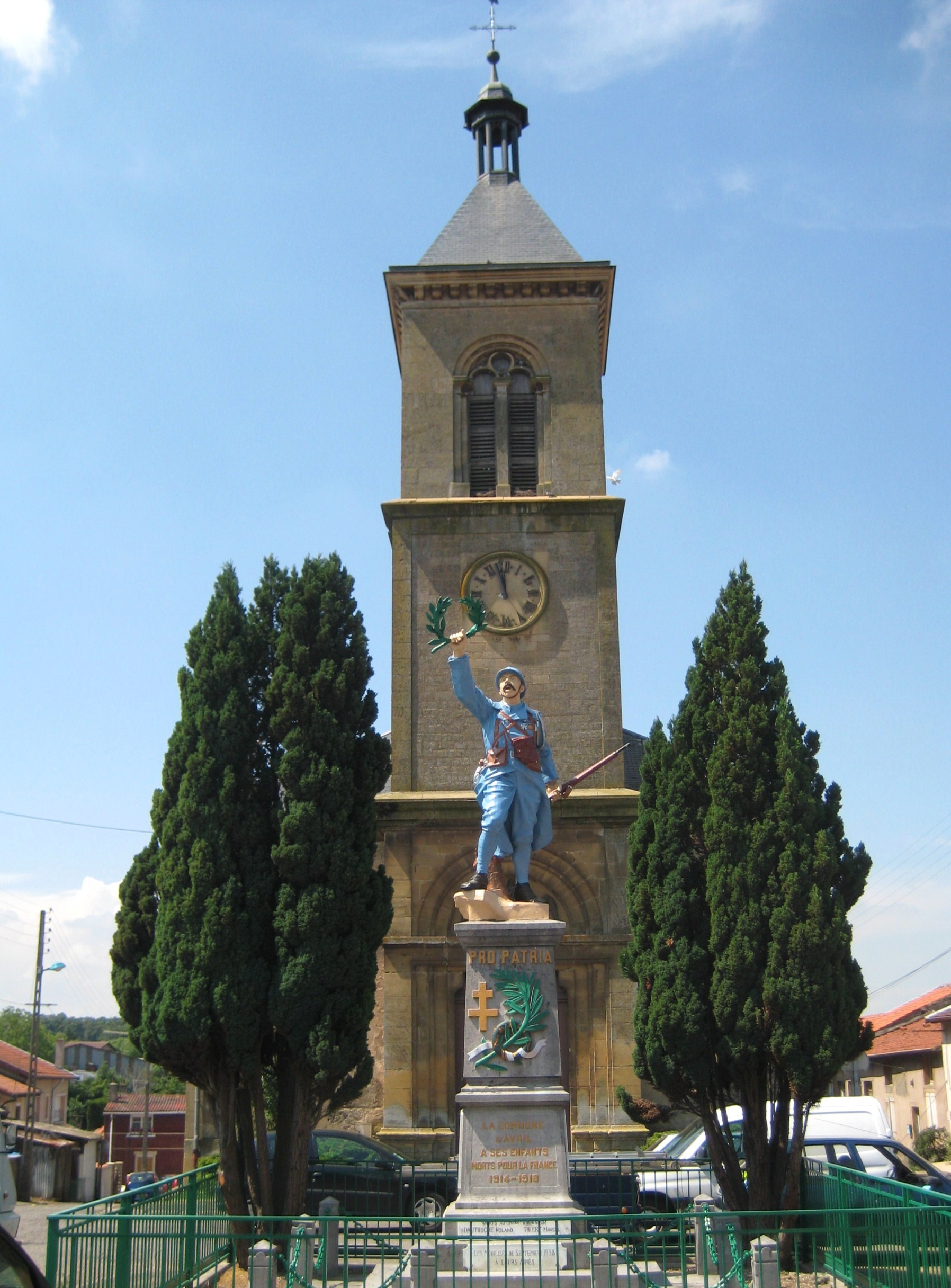
- The church in Avril

- Coat of arms
- Location of Avril
- Location within France Location within Grand Est
- Coordinates: 49°17′19″N 5°57′53″E
- Country: France
- Region: Grand Est
- Department: Meurthe-et-Moselle
- Arrondissement: Val-de-Briey
- Canton: Pays de Briey
- Intercommunality: Orne Lorraine Confluences

Government
  - Mayor (2020–2026): Didier Dante
- Area^{1}: 20.02 km^{2} (7.73 sq mi)
- Elevation: 302 m (991 ft)
- Highest elevation: 332 m (1,089 ft)
- Lowest elevation: 200 m (660 ft)
- Population (2023): 1,225
  - Density: 61.19/km^{2} (158.5/sq mi)
- Time zone: UTC+01:00 (CET)
  - Summer (DST): UTC+02:00 (CEST)
- INSEE/Postal code: 54036 /54150
- ^{1} French Land Register data, which excludes lakes, ponds, glaciers > 1 km^{2} (0.386 sq mi or 247 acres) and river estuaries.

Avril (French pronunciation: [avʁil]) is a commune in the Meurthe-et-Moselle department in northeastern France. It is the site of the former Augustinian abbey of Saint-Pierremont.

== Population ==
Historical population
Year	Pop.	±% p.a.
1968	515	—
1975	535	+0.55%
1982	508	−0.74%
1990	506	−0.05%
1999	579	+1.51%
2007	801	+4.14%
2012	1,021	+4.97%
2017	1,131	+2.07%
2023	1,225	+1.34%
Source: INSEE

== See also ==
- Communes of the Meurthe-et-Moselle department
