= Saint-Pierremont Abbey =

Abbey in Meurthe-et-Moselle, France

Abbey of Saint-Pierremont
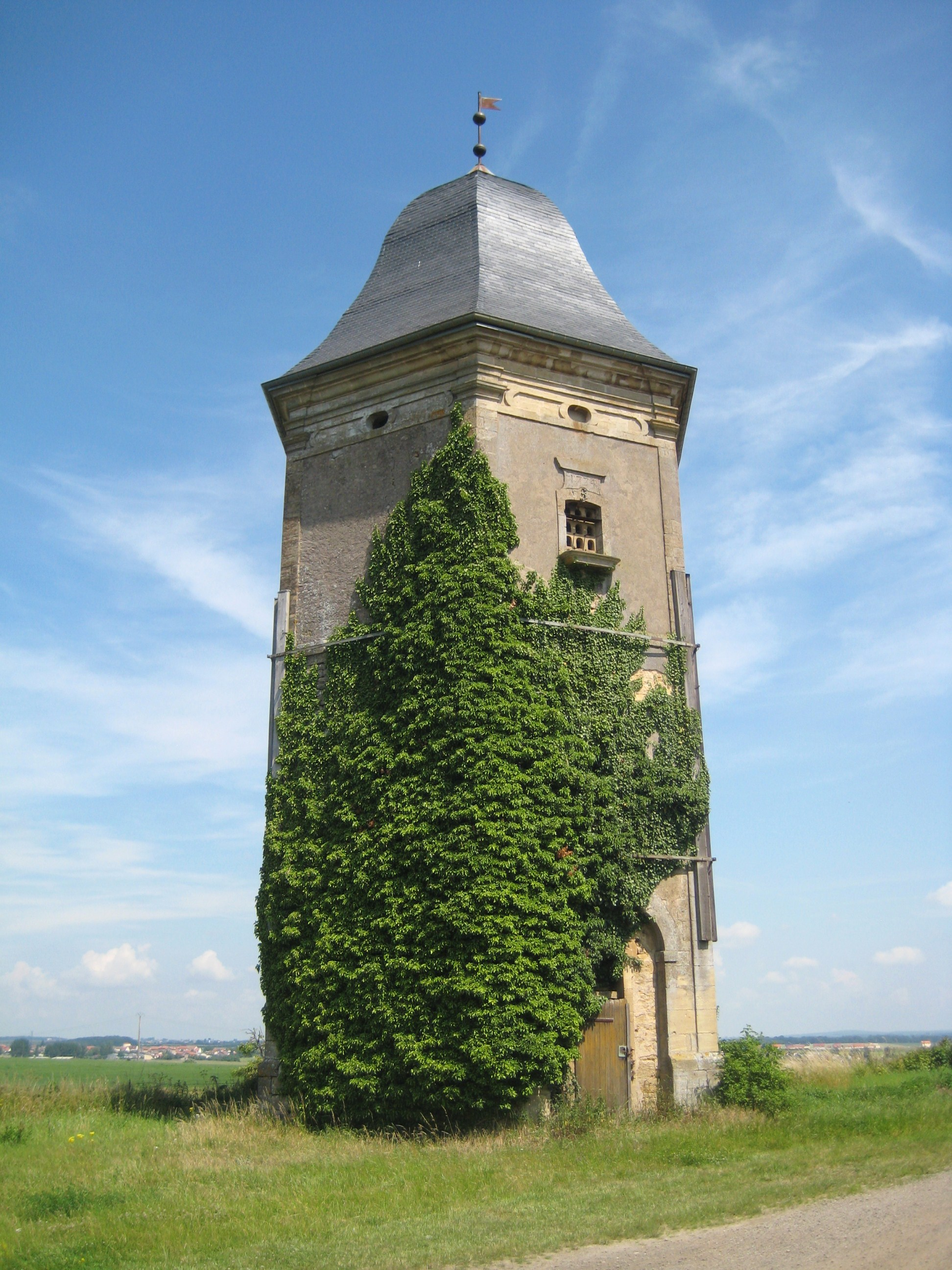
- Dovecote of the Abbey of St.-Pierremont

Religion
- Affiliation: Roman Catholic
- Province: Diocese of Metz
- Region: Lorraine
- Rite: Augustinians
- Year consecrated: 1090

Location
- Location: Avril, Meurthe-et-Moselle, France
- Country: France
- Interactive map of Abbey of Saint-Pierremont
- Coordinates: 49°18′23″N 5°56′25″E

Architecture
- Type: Monastery
- Style: Baroque

The Ancient Abbey of Canons Regular of St. Augustine of Saint-Pierremont (i.e., St. Peter's mountain) (French: Abbaye de Saint-Pierremont, German: Abtei Petersberg) is a former Augustinian abbey in the commune of Avril in what is now the Meurthe-et-Moselle département of France (formerly part of the Duchy of Bar in the Upper Lorraine region of the Holy Roman Empire), founded in the late eleventh century and dedicated to Saint Peter. Little is left of the medieval abbey buildings. Some buildings of the eighteenth century survive (enriched with older fragments, such as the arms of the abbot Jean Marius (1575-1597) and of the Duchy of Bar), notably the dovecote of the abbey, which was built in 1747 in the Baroque style and remodeled in 1774 with Rococo elements; it is registered in the Base Mérimée of notable French architectural monuments.

== History ==
The abbey was founded in 1090 by Lubricus, a Canon of the St. Stephen's Cathedral in Metz. Reginald I, Count of Bar became the Vogt of the abbey in 1102. In 1186, Saint-Pierremont briefly served as a refuge for the exiled Archbishop of Trier, Folmar of Karden, formerly a member of the congregation. In the course of the Counter-Reformation, the community was reformed by St. Pierre Fourier, who incorporated it into the Congregation of Our Savior. Subsequent to the invasion and subsequent annexation of the Duchy of Lorraine under Cardinal Richelieu in 1632, the saint and his fellow canons refused to take an oath of loyalty to King Louis XIII of France; as a result, the abbey was pillaged and razed in 1636, though partially restored later in that century and the subsequent one. Being situated in the Three Bishoprics, the abbey became part of France with the settlement of the Treaty of Westphalia in 1648. Though the congregation lost its formal independence in 1733, being made directly subordinate to the cathedral chapter of Metz, the community itself survived until the French Revolution.
