= Cœuvres-et-Valsery =

- Commune
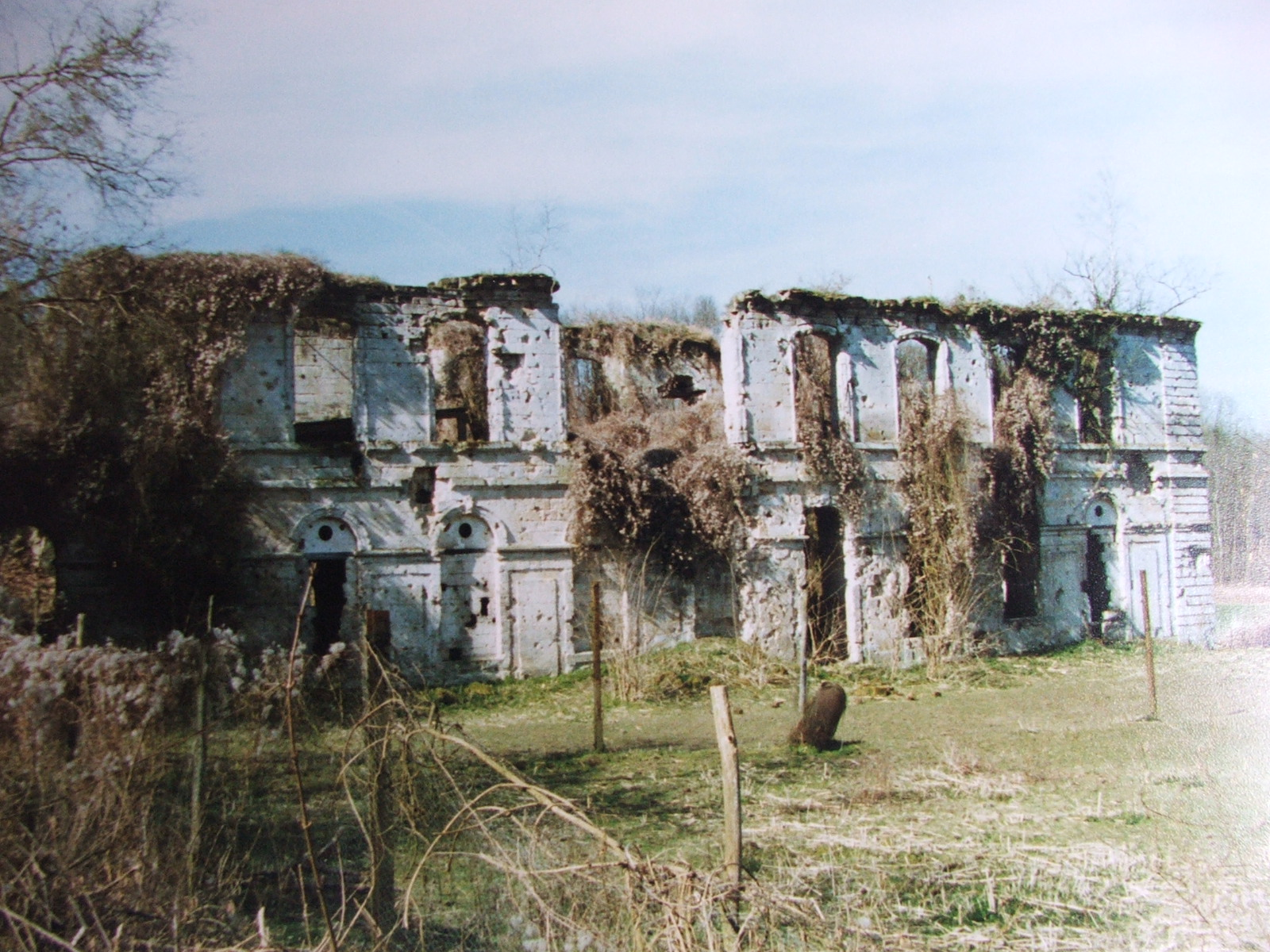
- Ruins of Valsery Abbey
- Location of Cœuvres-et-Valsery
- Location within France Location within Hauts-de-France
- Coordinates: 49°20′23″N 3°09′21″E
- Country: France
- Region: Hauts-de-France
- Department: Aisne
- Arrondissement: Soissons
- Canton: Vic-sur-Aisne

Government
  - Mayor (2026–32): Marie Pamart
- Area^{1}: 12.52 km^{2} (4.83 sq mi)
- Elevation: 137 m (449 ft)
- Highest elevation: 154 m (505 ft)
- Lowest elevation: 59 m (194 ft)
- Population (2023): 467
  - Density: 37.3/km^{2} (96.6/sq mi)
- Time zone: UTC+01:00 (CET)
  - Summer (DST): UTC+02:00 (CEST)
- INSEE/Postal code: 02201 /02600
- ^{1} French Land Register data, which excludes lakes, ponds, glaciers > 1 km^{2} (0.386 sq mi or 247 acres) and river estuaries.

Cœuvres-et-Valsery (French pronunciation: [kœvʁ e valsəʁi]) is a commune in the Aisne department in Hauts-de-France in northern France. The town is in the Arrondissement of Soissons.

== History ==
The commune of Cœuvres was created during the French Revolution. On 29 May 1830 it was abolished by ordinance and merged with the adjoining commune of Valsery. The new entity takes the name of Cœuvres-et-Valsery.

Until its merger with Valsery in 1845, the town was part of the canton of Vic-sur-Aisne in the department of Aisne. It also belonged to the district of Soissons since 1801 and the district of Soissons between 1790 and 1795.

Valsery Abbey (Abbaye Notre-Dame de Valsery) was a Premonstratensian monastery of the Diocese of Soissons, that used to be in the town.

== Population ==
Historical population
Year	Pop.	±% p.a.
1968	402	—
1975	399	−0.11%
1982	480	+2.68%
1990	449	−0.83%
1999	432	−0.43%
2007	468	+1.01%
2012	466	−0.09%
2017	438	−1.23%
2023	467	+1.07%
Source: INSEE

== See also ==
- Communes of the Aisne department
