= L'Étanche Abbey, Lorraine =

Abbey in Meuse, France

Coordinates: 48°58′23″N 5°38′0″E

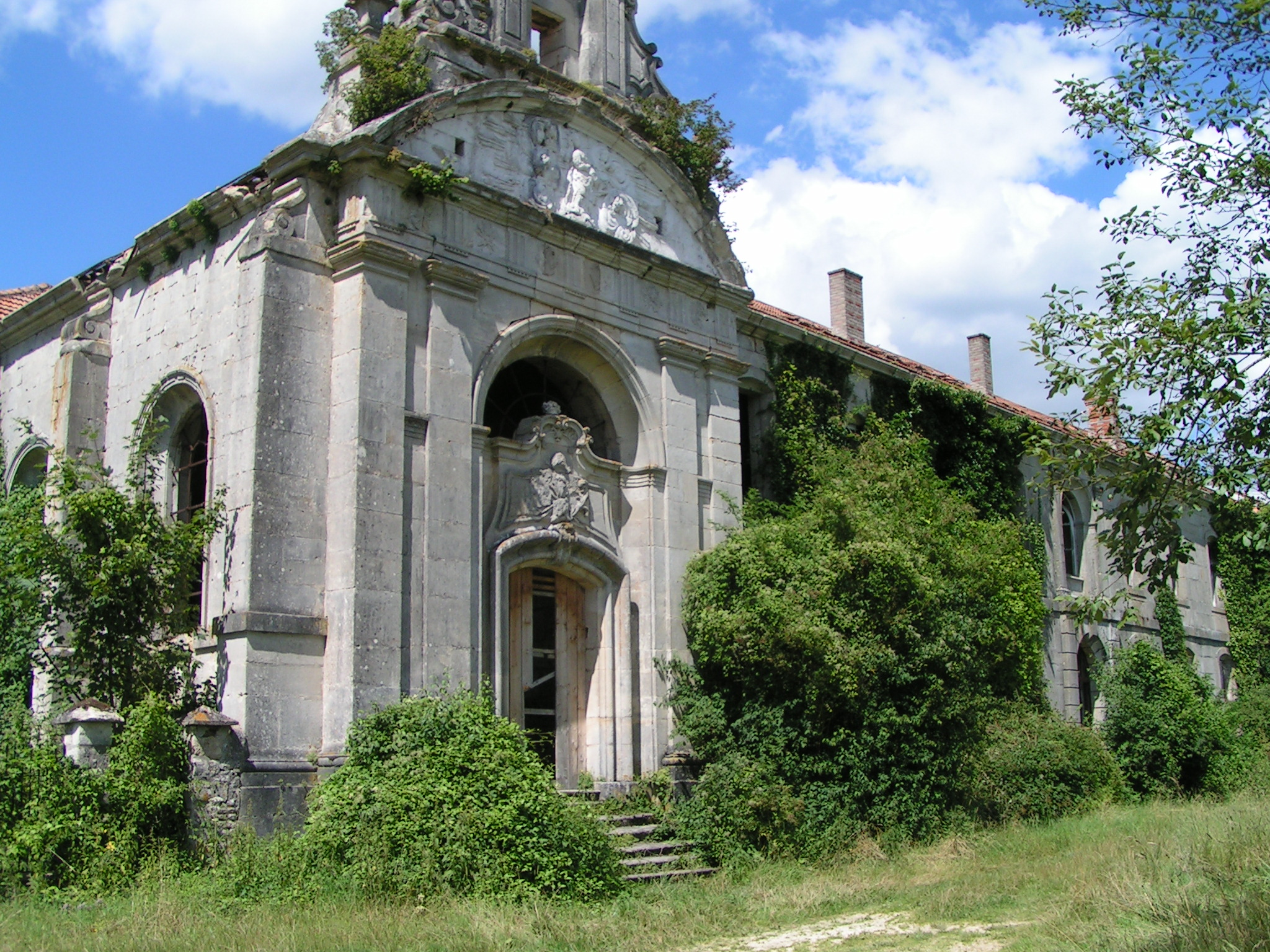
L'Étanche Abbey, Lorraine

not to be confused with the Cistercian L'Étanche Abbey in the Vosges department

L'Étanche Abbey is a former Premonstratensian monastery founded in the 12th century, the ruins of which are near the modern village of Deuxnouds-aux-Bois, in the commune of Lamorville, Meuse, France.

== History ==
The abbey of Notre-Dame de l'Étanche was founded in about 1144 by Philippe, abbot of Belval, in a secluded valley then known as Faverolles, near Deuxnouds-aux-Bois. The first patrons of the foundation were Albéron de Chiny, bishop of Verdun, and Bertrand le Loup and his nephew Albert, seigneurs of Faverolles, in whose lands the community was settled. The abbey church was consecrated in 1147. The earliest existing charter dates from 1157.

Nearby there was at first a Premonstratensian convent, which was dissolved in time. The modest abbey possessed a priory at Benoîte-Vaux, a famed place of pilgrimage in Lorraine.

The structures were utterly destroyed by the Swedes in 1632, during the Thirty Years' War, and were not rebuilt until 1743, with nine monastic cells in a range. The chapel was completed in 1770. Three abbés of L'Étanche were of note: Dom Dominique Callot, a student of chemistry and heraldry; Dom Edmont Maclot, author of pious works; and Dom Jean François Joseph Boucart, who assembled a collection of medals and a prestigious library, since dispersed.

== Site ==
The chapel and the monastic buildings, all in ruins, have been classified Monuments historiques since 1984. A subscription is launched in 2017 by the Fondation du Patrimoine to fund emergency repairs.
