= Abbecourt Abbey =

Former Premonstratensian monastery in France

Coordinates: 48.91°N 1.957°E

Abbecourt Abbey (French: Abbaye d'Abbecourt; Abbaye Notre-Dame d'Abbecourt; Latin: Beata Maria de Alba Curia) is a former Premonstratensian monastery in Orgeval, Yvelines, France.

Originally a small oratory, the abbey was founded, either in 1142 or 1180, by Gasun, seigneur of Poissy. It was a daughter house of Marcheroux Abbey, now in Oise. The church was consecrated in 1191.

The buildings were damaged in 1340, in the Hundred Years' War, and destroyed by the English between 1420 and 1437. Reconstruction began at the end of the 17th century, during the abbacy of Jean Penillon. In the early 18th century a pond on the site was discovered to have supposedly health-giving mineral properties and taking its waters became an attraction for the court of Louis XV, the royal Château of Saint-Germain-en-Laye being nearby.

In about 1740 the former almoner of Louis XV, the Abbé Louis Grisard, replaced the guest accommodation, besides adding a gallery to the cloister and making alterations to the principal building and the dormitory. In 1741, the architect Louis François Herbet drew up plans for a new church, construction of which was completed by the architect Claude-Louis d'Aviler from 1743 to 1749. In the 1780s the dormitory was rebuilt by Jean-François Raimbert.

The monastery was suppressed in the French Revolution, when the church was destroyed. The site was used as a source of stone, and in 1827 all the remaining buildings were demolished. Only a few ruins remain and the toponym "Allée d'Abbecourt".
