= Abbey of St John the Baptist, Falaise =

Abbey in Falaise, France

The Abbey of St John the Baptist (French: Abbaye Saint-Jean de Falaise), in the diocese of Séez, in Falaise, Normandy, was an Augustinian abbey for Premonstratensian Canons and hospital founded in 1127 by Goinfrid, (French: Gonfroy, Latin: Gonfridus).

== Founding ==
A pilgrim had died of hunger and exhaustion having taken shelter in a barn belonging to Goinfrid, son of Roger or Rou, and when the dead body was discovered the next morning the population of the town of Falaise was much saddened. Goinfrid decided to found on the site a hospital to care for such pilgrims, and this was founded in 1127 under the name of the "Hospital of St Michael". In 1130 a papal bull confirming the foundation was given at Rouen, capital of Normandy, by Pope Innocent II, with the express consent of King Henry I of England. In 1133 the Hospital was re-dedicated to St John the Baptist and a new church was built on the site.

== Donations by Henry I of England ==
King Henry I (1100–1135) of England made two donations to this institution at the time of its re-founding, in 1132 and 1133:

== 1132 charter ==
King Henry I's Latin charter of 1132 is summarised as follows in English:

"Charter of Henry I. addressed to the archbishop of Rouen and all his officers and lieges of England and Normandy. He gives the Hospital of Falaise and the brethren, clerk and lay, there serving, for the remission of his sins and the weal of his parents' souls, his mill at Falaise, which Goinfrid constructed, and a piece of land in the "fair field" (in campo ferie, modern French: Champ de la foire, i.e. field in which a fair was held). And he confirms to it all the land and houses and ovens (furnos) and gold and silver and rents and everything else which Goinfrid granted it in England and Normandy and in the town of Falaise, and everything given or to be given lawfully; and Robert, the son and heir of Goinfrid has granted in his presence, all his father's gifts. He has taken under his own protection the hospital and brethren and all belonging to it, and frees it from all toll and passage, money and dues, etc. etc. for ever, throughout his kingdom of England and duchy of Normandy. [All] this is confirmed by the letters of the worshipful father Pope Innocent".

== 1133 charter ==
King Henry I's Latin charter of 1133 is summarised as follows in English:

"Charter of Henry I addressed to the Archbishop of Rouen and all his officers and lieges. He [as king of the English and of Normandy] gives for the weal of the souls of his father and mother, his relatives (Latin: parentes) and his sons and for the remission of his sins and the [good] estate and safety of his realm, to the church of St. John the Baptist and the Hospital of Falaise, founded by Goinfrid, and the clerks there serving God, according to the rule of the blessed Augustine, for their use and that of Christ's poor, whom they may receive there the mill etc. [as in the preceding charter]".

== Later confirmations ==
Confirmations of Henry I's grants were made by his descendants King Henry II (1154–1189) and by his son King John (1199–1216). In 1157 Henry II of England confirmed the use of "whatever they need in his wood of Gufern at Argentan for firing and building", as well as permission for an annual fair at Michaelmas.

== Sources ==
- Mériel, Amédée, Histoire de L'Abbaye Royale de Saint-Jean-de-Falaise, Ordre de Prémontrés, 2nd edition, Alençon, 1883 Histoire de l'abbaye royale de Saint-Jean-de-Falaise, ordre de Prémontrés, par Amédée Mériel. 2e édition
