= Authon, Loir-et-Cher =

Authon
- Commune
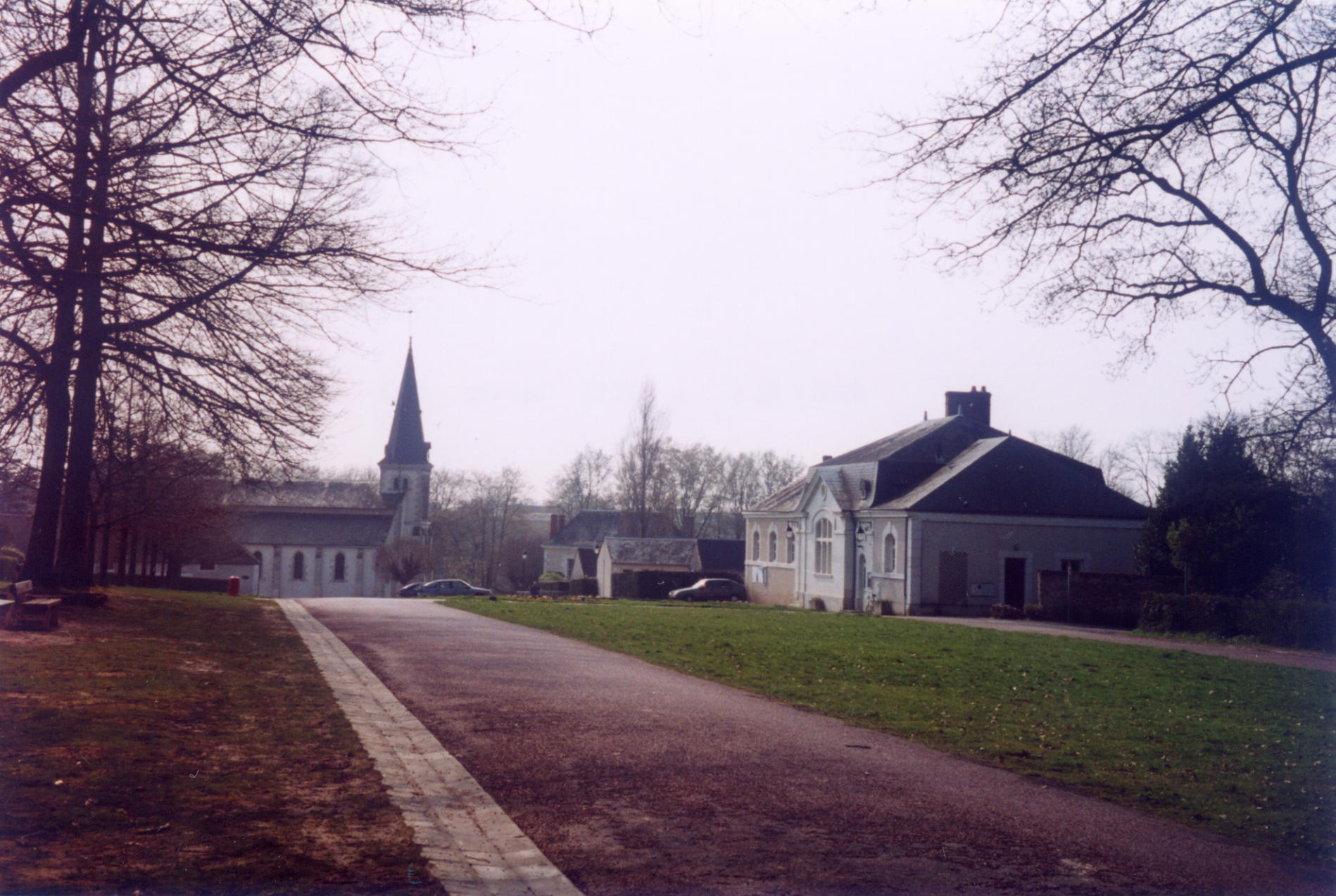
- Church and town hall

- Coat of arms
- Location of Authon
- Location within France Location within Centre-Val de Loire
- Coordinates: 47°38′40″N 0°53′52″E
- Country: France
- Region: Centre-Val de Loire
- Department: Loir-et-Cher
- Arrondissement: Vendôme
- Canton: Montoire-sur-le-Loir
- Intercommunality: CA Territoires Vendômois

Government
  - Mayor (2020–2026): Marie-José Cintrat
- Area^{1}: 32.26 km^{2} (12.46 sq mi)
- Elevation: 135 m (443 ft)
- Highest elevation: 156 m (512 ft)
- Lowest elevation: 90 m (300 ft)
- Population (2023): 753
  - Density: 23.3/km^{2} (60.5/sq mi)
- Time zone: UTC+01:00 (CET)
  - Summer (DST): UTC+02:00 (CEST)
- INSEE/Postal code: 41007 /41310
- ^{1} French Land Register data, which excludes lakes, ponds, glaciers > 1 km^{2} (0.386 sq mi or 247 acres) and river estuaries.

Authon (French pronunciation: [ɔtɔ̃] or [otɔ̃]) is a commune in the Loir-et-Cher department in the region of Centre-Val de Loire, France, next to Vendôme.

== Population ==
Historical population
Year	Pop.	±% p.a.
1968	767	—
1975	691	−1.48%
1982	699	+0.16%
1990	700	+0.02%
1999	698	−0.03%
2007	634	−1.19%
2012	675	+1.26%
2017	721	+1.33%
2023	753	+0.73%
Source: INSEE

== Economy ==
Economic activities are mainly agricultural, with some services including tourism (there are three castles, nature trails and a popular restaurant). A couple of streams run through the village's territory, including one facetiously named the Danube.

== Personalities ==
The village has supplied a resistance hero, François de Brantes, and, in his daughter Anne-Aymone, a wife to former president Valéry Giscard d'Estaing (d.2020). The latter is buried in Authon alongside his daughter Jacinte.

== See also ==
- Communes of the Loir-et-Cher department
