= Kirkwood (surname) =

Kirkwood is a surname of Scottish origin which means "the wood near the church." Notable people with the surname include:

- Antoinette Kirkwood (1930–2014), English musician and composer
- Archy Kirkwood, Baron Kirkwood of Kirkhope (born 1946), British politician
- Billy Kirkwood (born 1958), Scottish football athlete and coach
- Bob Kirkwood (1939–2017), United States businessman in California
- Bryan Kirkwood (born 1976), Scottish-born British television producer
- Carly Flynn (fl. 1990s–present), New Zealand journalist, born Carly Kirkwood
- Carol Kirkwood (fl. 1980s–present), Scottish BBC TV presenter
- Craig Kirkwood (born 1974), United States lawyer
- Cris Kirkwood (born 1960), United States musician
- Curt Kirkwood (born 1957), United States musician
- Dan Kirkwood (1900–1977), Scottish athlete in football
- Daniel Kirkwood (1814–1895), United States astronomer
- Daniel Kirkwood (footballer born 1867), Scottish athlete in football
- David Kirkwood (1872–1955), British politician
- Davie Kirkwood (born 1967), Scottish athlete in football
- Don Kirkwood (born 1949), United States athlete in baseball
- Euan Kirkwood (born 1934), Scottish cricketer
- Fred Kirkwood (1890–1956), Australian athlete in football
- Harry Kirkwood (fl. 1930s–1960s), British naval captain
- Henry Kirkwood (1886–1954), English cricketer and British Army officer
- James Kirkwood (disambiguation), any of several men with the name
- Jimmy Kirkwood (born 1962), Irish field hockey player and cricketer
- Jodyanne Kirkwood, New Zealand business academic
- Joe Kirkwood, Jr. (1920–2006), Australian-born United States golfer and film actor
- Joe Kirkwood, Sr. (1897–1970), Australian golfer and actor
- John A. Kirkwood (1851–1930), United States military hero
- John Gamble Kirkwood (1907–1959), United States chemist and physicist
- Julieta Kirkwood (1936–1985), Chilean sociologist, political scientist, professor, and activist
- Keith Kirkwood (born 1993), American football player
- Ken Kirkwood (born 1969), Canadian bioethicist
- Kyle Kirkwood (born 1998), American Racing driver
- Lucy Kirkwood (born 1984), British playwright
- Mary Kirkwood (1904–1995), American artist
- Pat Kirkwood (racing driver) (1927–2001), United States NASCAR participant
- Patricia Kirkwood (1921–2007), British stage actress
- Robert C. Kirkwood (1909–1964), United States politician in California
- Sam Kirkwood (1910–1980), Irish athlete in football
- Samuel J. Kirkwood (1813–1894), United States politician
- Thomas William Kirkwood (1884–?), Scottish athlete in polo
- Thomas Kirkwood (born 1951), South Africa-born English biologist
- Te Rongo Kirkwood (fl. 2000s–present), New Zealand glass sculptor

== See also ==
- Wood (surname)
