= Hugues de Fosses =

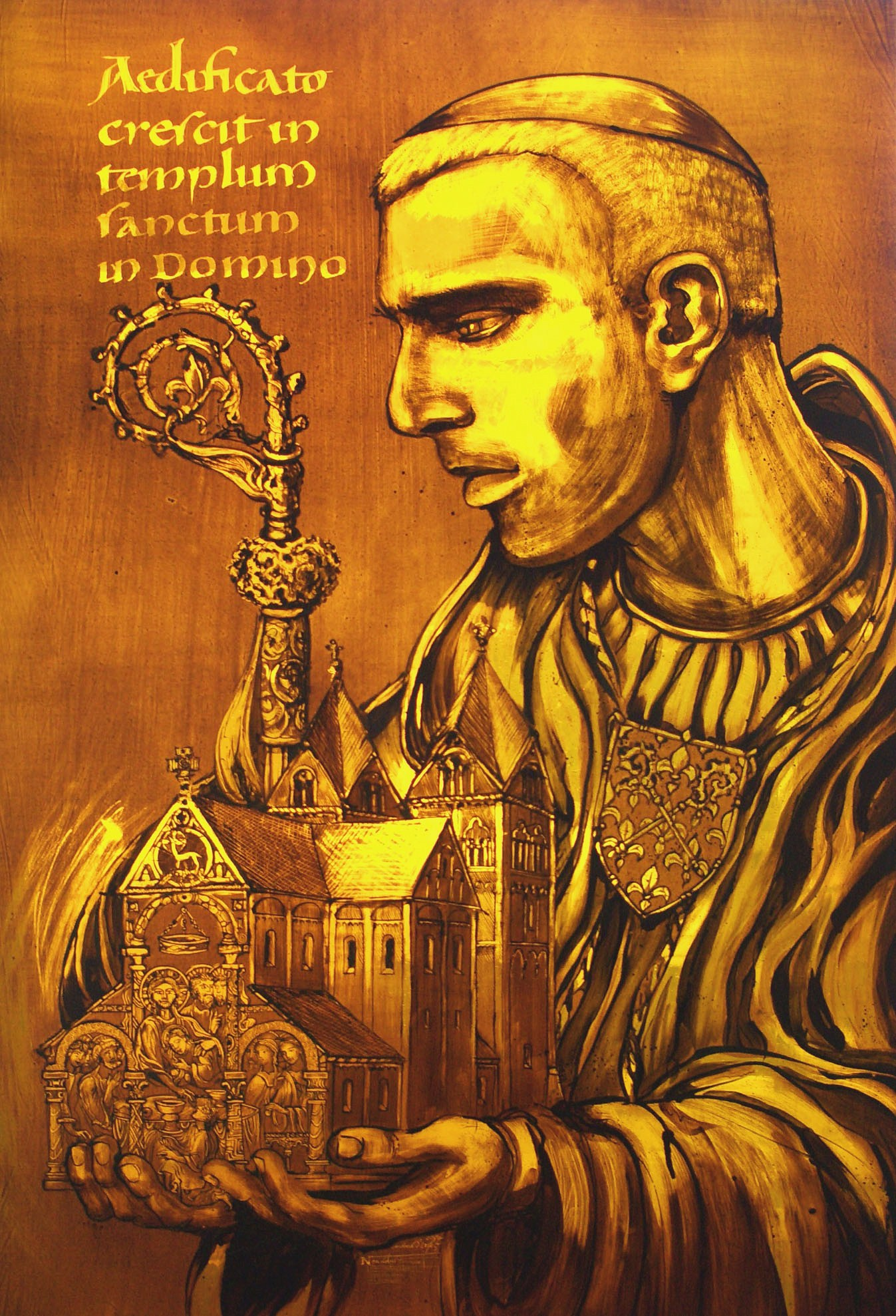

Hugues de Fosses (*ca. 1093, Fosses-la-Ville; +10.02.1164, Prémontré) was a Norbertine Abbot and successor of Saint Norbert as the Abbot of Prémontré Abbey, the mother house of the Premonstratensians. The Order and the Catholic Church venerate him as a Blessed.

== Biography ==
Hugo was brought up at Fosses. Later he was an assistant priest of bishop Burchard of Cambrai. Louis VI of France wanted to appoint him as bishop of Chartres, but he refused. In 1119, he followed Saint Norbert and became a Norbertine. Six years later, he became abbot, in 1134, he became General Abbot of the Order.

Hugo wrote the first rule of the Order, the first guide on liturgical ceremonies of the order and commissioned a biography of Saint Norbert.

During his lifetime, 120 monasteries were opened. In 1161, he stepped down as Abbot of Prémontré.

== Veneration ==
His cult as Blessed was approved by Pope Pius XI. on the 13th July 1927. His remains are buried at San Roberto Church in Rome, the General House of the Premonstratensians.
