= Forceville (organ builders) =

Family of organ builders

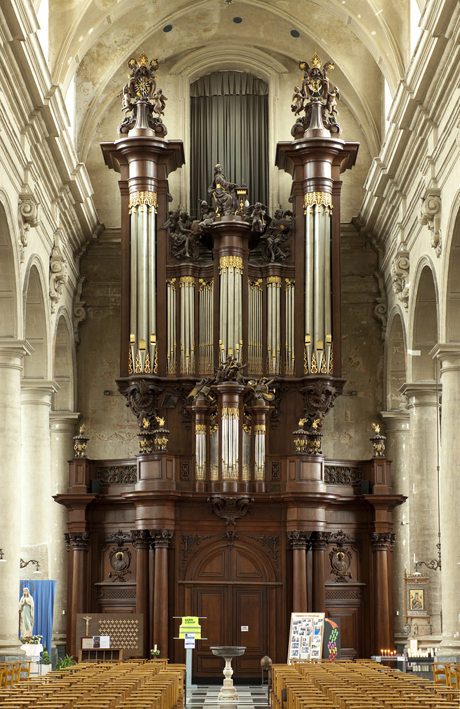
Organ of the Church of Our Lady of the Assumption, Ninove, Jean-Baptiste Forceville

The Forceville family were a family of organ builders from the Southern Netherlands based in Antwerp.

Joannes Baptista Forceville (1655–1739), sometimes called "father of the Flemish Rococo organ" was born in Saint-Omer, where he was apprenticed to his fellow townsman Francois van Isacker (Veurne, 1633 – Saint-Omer, 1682), he then worked as a travelling organ builder before settling in Antwerp, where he later entered the Guild of Saint Luke. In about 1705 he moved to Brussels where he was appointed organ master at the Court and was charged with the construction of a monumental organ in the Cathedral of St. Michael and St. Gudula.

Jean-Baptiste Forceville formed renowned organ builders such as Egide Le Blas,Jean-Baptiste Goynaut, Pieter van Peteghem and his own son Jean Thomas. After his death in 1739, they continued to follow in his footsteps. Jean-Baptiste Forceville is also considered the organ builder who best synthesizes the French and Flemish styles. He imbued the Brussels style with French influence. The Franco-Flemish style introduced into organ building in Belgium by Forceville persisted there until the end of the 19th century. The Nivelles organ builders such as Adrien Rochet and Antoine Coppin would also build with a sound ideal that is related to this Forceville school.

Johannes Thomas Forceville (1696–1750) was born in Antwerp, where his father had moved from Saint-Omer. He was the son of Jean-Baptiste Forceville and his first wife Magdalena Cannaert. He was trained by his father and, after working with him, by 1734 was working autonomously. In 1734 he restored the organ of the Church of Our Lady of Laeken in association with Egide Le Blas.

He delivered a new organ with eight registers in Wolvertem (Saint Laurentius Church, 1744). He died in 1750 while working on a larger commission in the Basilica of Saint Servatius in Grimbergen. This organ was finished by Jean-Baptiste Goynaut.

== See also ==
- List of pipe organ builders
