= Hugh of Fosses =

French Premonstratensian abbot (c. 1093–1163)

Hugh of Fosses (c. 1093 – c. 1163) was the second abbot of the Premonstratensian order, following Saint Norbert of Xanten. Pope Pius XI confirmed the longstanding cult associated with Hugh on 13 July 1927, declaring him a Blessed.

== Early life ==
Hugh was born in Fosses, France, and was orphaned at a young age. He had been ordained a priest and was serving Bishop Burchard of Cambrai when he first encountered Saint Norbert of Xanten. Hugh soon decided to become a follower of Norbert, who had recently begun preaching throughout the French countryside.

== Career ==
Hugh was Norbert's close companion when the first Premonstratensian house was founded in Prémontré. As Norbert became more involved in apostolic work, Hugh took on many roles at Prémontré Abbey, including drawing up the statutes of the order. When Norbert was named archbishop of Magdeburg, Hugh formally became the abbot of the Prémontré Abbey and superior general of the order.

Hugh served in this role for the next thirty-five years, founded many new houses, and is considered the second founder of the Premonstratensian order, also called the Norbertine order.

== Death ==
Blessed Hugh of Fosses died on 10 February 1164 (or 1163, according to the 2024 Martyrologium Romanum).
