= Kirkwood =

Kirkwood may refer to:

== Locations ==
=== Antarctica ===
- Kirkwood Islands, string of islands near Antarctica
- Kirkwood Range, massive coastal mountain chain in Antarctica
- Mount Kirkwood, mountain in Antarctica

=== Australia ===
- Kirkwood, Queensland, a locality in the Gladstone Region

=== Canada ===
- Kirkwood, New Brunswick, Canada

=== South Africa ===
- Kirkwood, Eastern Cape, a town in South Africa

=== United Kingdom ===
- Kirkwood, Coatbridge, a neighbourhood in Coatbridge, Scotland
- Kirkwood Estate, East Ayrshire, in Scotland

=== United States ===
- Kirkwood, California, in Alpine and Amador Counties in the state of California
- Kirkwood, Tehama County, California, in Tehama County in the state of California
- Kirkwood Mountain Resort, mountain resort in the state of California
- Kirkwood, Delaware, in the state of Delaware
- Kirkwood (Atlanta), in the city of Atlanta, in the state of Georgia
- Kirkwood, Illinois, in the state of Illinois
- Kirkwood, Kansas
- Kirkwood, Missouri, in the state of Missouri
- Kirkwood, New Jersey, in the state of New Jersey
- Kirkwood, New York, in the state of New York
- Kirkwood, Ohio, in the state of Ohio
- Kirkwood Township, Belmont County, Ohio, one of 16 townships of Belmont County in the state of Ohio
- Kirkwood, Pennsylvania, in the state of Pennsylvania
- Kirkwood, West Virginia, an unincorporated community

== Structures ==
- Kirkwood (Eutaw, Alabama), historic house in Eutaw, in the US state of Alabama
- Kirkwood Building, historic building (1920) in Kansas City, in the US state of Missouri
- Kirkwood Community College, post-secondary public educational institution in Cedar Rapids, in the US state of Iowa
- Kirkwood High School, secondary public school in Kirkwood, Missouri
- Kirkwood Hospice, palliative-care facility in Huddersfield, West Yorkshire
- Kirkwood House, Iowa
- Kirkwood House, Washington, D.C. (1848–1874)
- Kirkwood Observatory, astronomical observatory near Bloomington, in the US state of Indiana
- Kirkwood station (disambiguation), stations of the name
- Hotel Kirkwood, historic structure in Des Moines, in the US state of Iowa
- Joseph Kirkwood House, historic dwelling in Bridgeport, in the US state of Ohio

== Other uses ==
- Kirkwood (surname), a surname
- Kirkwood Otey (1832-1897), soldier in the Confederate Army during the US Civil Way
- Baron Kirkwood, a title in the Peerage of the United Kingdom
- Kirkwood approximation, a mathematical superposition approximation introduced by Matsuda in 2000
- Kirkwood City Council shooting, a 2008 tragedy in Kirkwood, Missouri
- Kirkwood-Cohansey aquifer, an aquifer in the US state of New Jersey
- Kirkwood (crater), a crater on the far side of Earth's Moon
- Kirkwood Formation, a geologic feature in South Africa
- Kirkwood gap, an observed gap in the main asteroid belt
- Kirkwood Mall, an enclosed shopping center in Bismarck, in the US state of North Dakota
- Kirkwood Highway, part of Delaware Route 2 in the US state of Delaware
- Kirkwood, a system on a chip by Marvell Technology Group used in plug computers
- Kirkwood, a brand of poultry products available at Aldi stores
- 1578 Kirkwood, an asteroid that was discovered in 1951
