= Jean Behourt =

Jean Behourt, born in the first half of the 16th century in Rouen where he died in 1621, was a French grammarian and playwright.

A regent of the collège des Bons Enfants de Rouen from 1586 to 1620, Jean Behourt wrote three tragedies for this collège: Polixène, tragicomedy in three acts, with choirs, derived from the first book of Histoires tragiques by Pierre Boisteau, dedicated to the princess of Montpensier, presented on 7 September 1597, Esaü, ou le chasseur, tragedy in five acts, dédicated to the duke of Montpensier, presented on 2 August 1598, and Hypsicratée ou la Magnanimité, dedicated to Georges de Montigny, tragedy in five acts, presented in the same location.

In 1607, Béhourd also drafted a compendium of Despautère's Latin grammar which, abbreviated in turn, has long been used in colleges under the name Petit Behourt.

== Works ==
- 1597: Polixène, Rouen, Raphaël du Petit-Val
- 1598: Esaü, ou le chasseur, Rouen, Raphaël du Petit-Val
- 1604: Hypsicratée ou la Magnanimité, Rouen, Raphaël du Petit-Val
- 1603: Sententiæ puriores cum dictis festivioribus in usum pueritiæ ex Ovidio excerptæ ingulis, adjecta est sua epigraphe, Rouen, Jean Osmon
- 1684: Grammatica Joannis Despauterii, in commodiorem docendi et discendi usum redacta, Lyon, Antoine Thomaz
- Despauterius minor seu Joannis Despauterii, latinae grammatices epitome, in commodiorem docendi et discendi usum redacta ... Adjectiva est facilioris intelligentiae causa et gallica versuum Despauterii, 8 v., Caen, Guillaume Richard, [s.d.], 514 p.

== Bibliography ==
- Pierre-François Godard de Beauchamps, Recherches sur les théâtres de France depuis l'année onze cens soixante-un, jusques à present, Paris, Prault père, 1735
- Émile Faguet, Histoire de la littérature française depuis les origines jusqu’à la fin du XVIe, Paris, Plon, Nourrit et Cie, 1900
- Édouard Gosselin, Recherches sur les origines et l'histoire du théâtre à Rouen avant Pierre Corneille, Rouen, Cagniard, 1868
- François Parfaict, Histoire du théâtre françois depuis son origine jusqu'à présent. Avec la vie des plus célèbres poëtes dramatiques, un catalogue exact de leurs pièces, & des notes historiques & critiques, Paris, P. G. Le Mercier, 1745–49
- Édouard Frère, Manuel du bibliographe normand, Rouen, Le Brument, 1860, p. 88.
- Théodore-Éloi Lebreton, Biographie rouennaise, Rouen, Le Brument, 1865, p. 25.

== See also ==
- French Renaissance literature
