= Evenepoel =

Evenepoel is a Belgian surname. Notable people with the surname include:

- Henri Evenepoel (1872–1899), Belgian artist
- Johan Evenepoel (born 1965), Belgian composer
- Patrick Evenepoel (born 1968), Belgian cyclist
- Remco Evenepoel (born 2000), Belgian cyclist
