= Kirkwood station =

Kirkwood station may refer to:

- Kirkwood station (Missouri), an Amtrak station in Kirkwood, Missouri, U.S.A.
- Kirkwood railway station, a train station in Coatbridge, Scotland
- Kirkwood/La Salle Station, a Muni Metro station in San Francisco, California

== See also ==
- Kirkwood (disambiguation)
