= Ninove =

- City and municipality
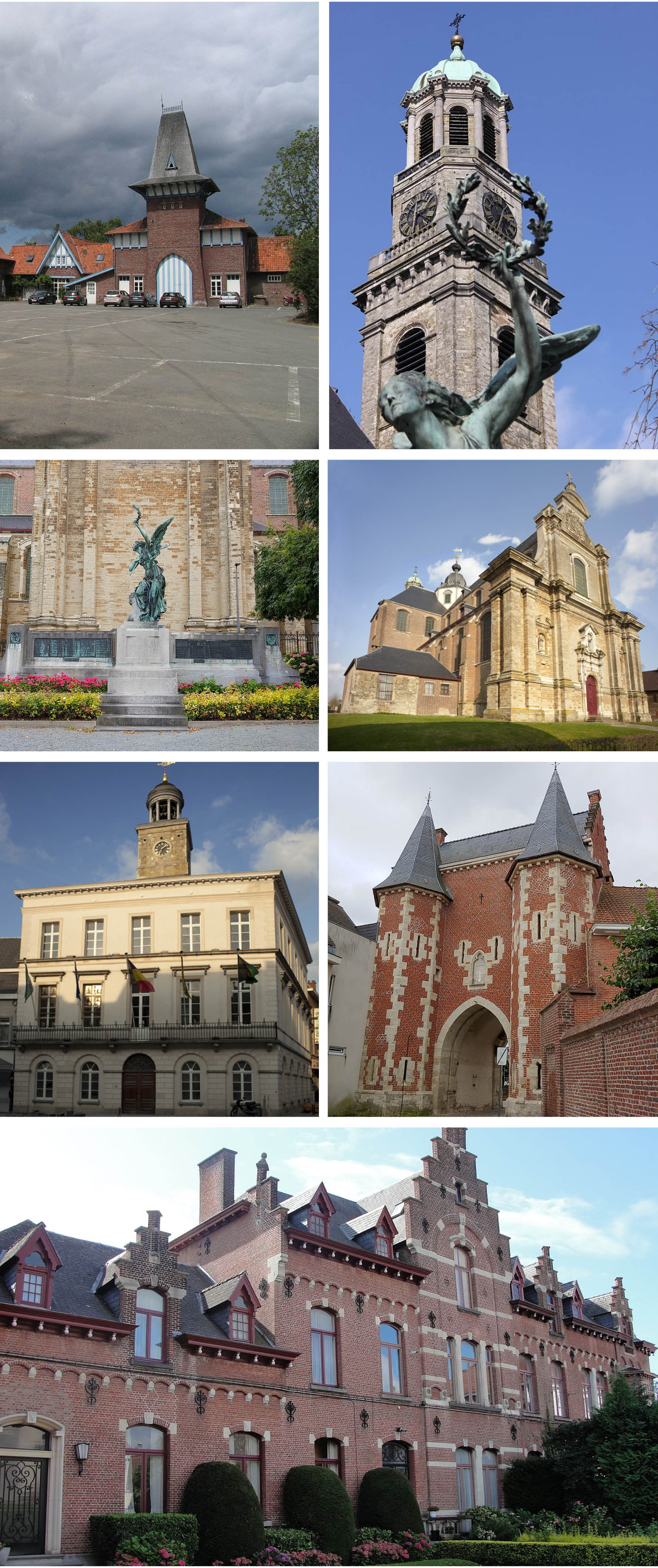
- Collage of Ninove

- Flag Coat of arms

- Ninove in the province of East Flanders
- Interactive map of Ninove
- Location in Belgium
- Coordinates: 50°50′N 4°01′E
- Country: Belgium
- Community: Flemish Community
- Region: Flemish Region
- Province: East Flanders
- Arrondissement: Aalst

Government
  - Mayor: Guy D'haeseleer (Forza Ninove)
  - Governing party: Forza Ninove

Area
  - Total: 73.12 km^{2} (28.23 sq mi)

Population (2022-01-01)
  - Total: 39,626
  - Density: 541.9/km^{2} (1,404/sq mi)
- Postal codes: 9400, 9401, 9402, 9403, 9404, 9406
- NIS code: 41048
- Area codes: 054
- Website: www.ninove.be

Ninove (Dutch pronunciation: [ˈninoːvə]) is a city and municipality in the Flemish province of East Flanders in Belgium. It is on the river Dender, and is part of the Denderstreek. The municipality comprises the city of Ninove proper and since the 1976 merger of the towns of Appelterre-Eichem, Aspelare, Denderwindeke, Lieferinge, Meerbeke, Nederhasselt, Neigem, Okegem, Outer, Pollare and Voorde. On 1 January 2023 Ninove had a total population of 40.090. The total area is 72.57 km^{2} which gives a population density of 553 inhabitants per km^{2}.

== History ==
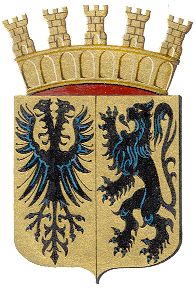
Ancient coat of arms of Ninove with mural crown

The oldest version of the name "Ninove", Neonifus dates from the 9th century. Later versions of the city name were Ninive and Nineve. The current version of the city name dates from the 14th century. The origin of the city name is not clear. There are two theories about the origin. One states that name is from Roman origin, the other states that it is of Frankish origin. The meaning of the name, however, is known. Ninove means "nieuw weiland" or in English, "new pasture".

During Roman rule, Ninove was a small settlement located in the current "Nederwijk". With the arrival of the Franks in the 4th century AD, the settlement grew to a small agricultural town. The area on which Ninove is located was from 843 on part of the Holy Roman Empire. In the 11th century this area was conquered by the Count of Flanders, Boudewijn V and the whole area between the rivers Scheldt and Dender became part of Flanders.

From the 11th century on, the medieval castrum was fortified into a castle stronghold. Because it lay on the trade route between Flanders and Brabant, the town prospered and grew into a city. In 1137, Norbertine monks from Park Abbey founded the Saint Cornelius Abbey (Abbey of Our Lady and SS. Cornelius and Cyprian), adjacent to the city (see below). In 1295 the town and lands were bought by the count of Flanders Guy of Dampierre. His grandson Henry awarded the town a city charter in 1339.

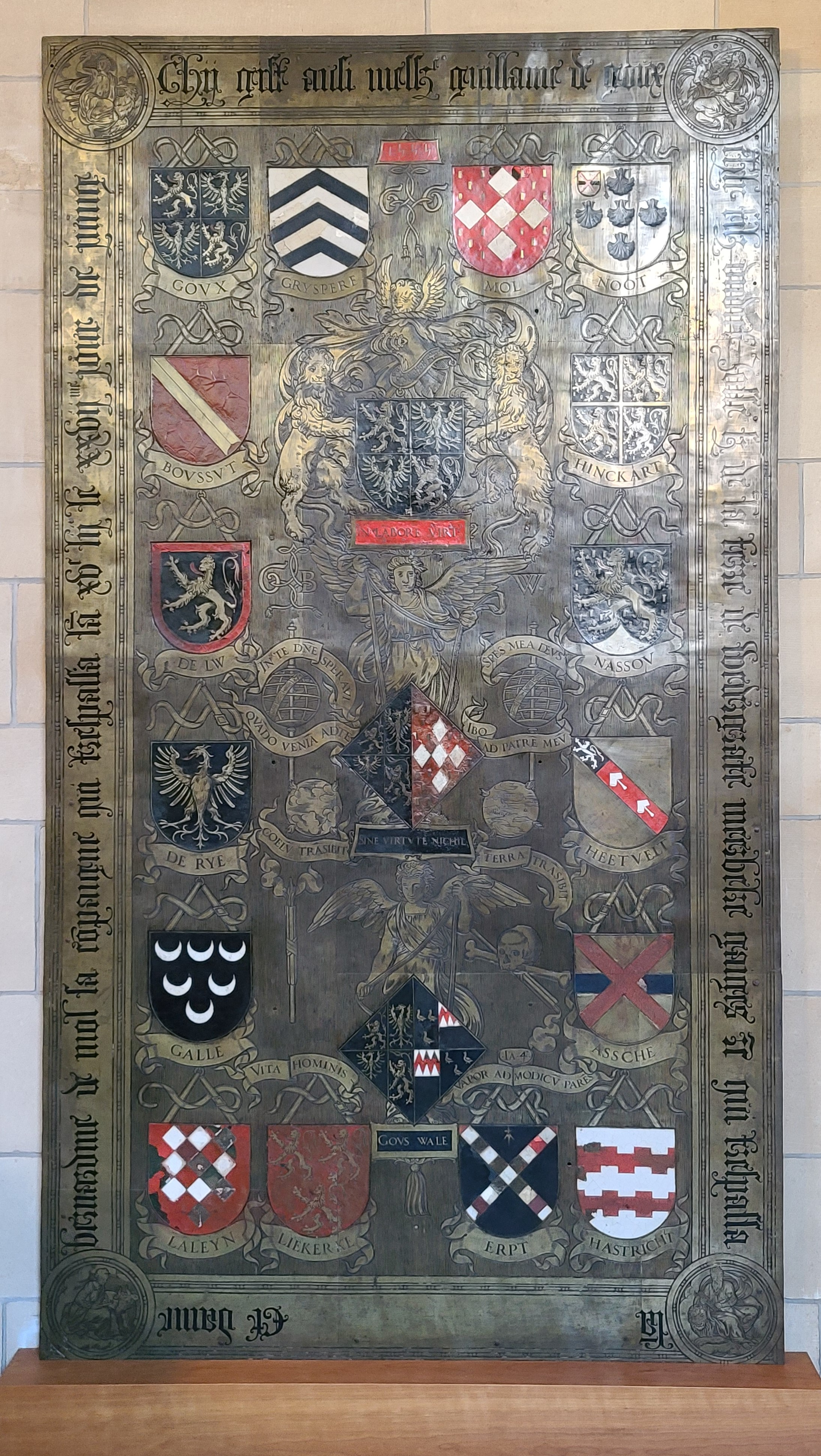
1558 Wijnegem tomb plate of Guillaume de Goux, the owner of Meerbeke and Kasteel Van Wedergrate (Appelterre-Eichem in Ninove)

The 15th–17th centuries were a bad time for the city as the region was plagued with war and religious and political strife. The abbey was plundered by the French in 1578 during the reformation. In 1658, Ninove was occupied by the French army. After the Treaty of the Pyrenees, the French returned the area back to Spain but the area was to change hands many times during the wars of Louis XIV and Louis XV.

During the 17th century Ninove was crippled under the indemnities laid on it by the warring parties and the town faced a big economic crisis as its cloth industry went into decline. The big abbey was closed by the French in 1796, after Flanders was annexed to France. The town served as a cavalry headquarters during the Waterloo Campaign of 1815.

During the 19th century Ninove became industrialized and by the time of the First World War, the city became the centre of the Flemish match industry. This industry however declined in importance until the last match factory closed during the late 1970s.

From 1973 to 2011 the town of Meerbeke was the finish of the cycling race Tour of Flanders.

The population of Ninove has steadily grown and the city has become an attractive centre for commercial, recreational and economical activities in the area, and plays host to a popular annual Volkswagen show every March, specifically for air-cooled vehicles, i.e. Beetles, Camper-vans, Type 3's, 4's etc. The opening of a shopping mall in the centre of the city, as well as new sport and cultural infrastructure, and the construction of many residential apartment buildings have made Ninove a growing competitor for nearby Aalst and an ideal living-place for many commuters who work in nearby Brussels.

=== Premonstratensian abbey ===
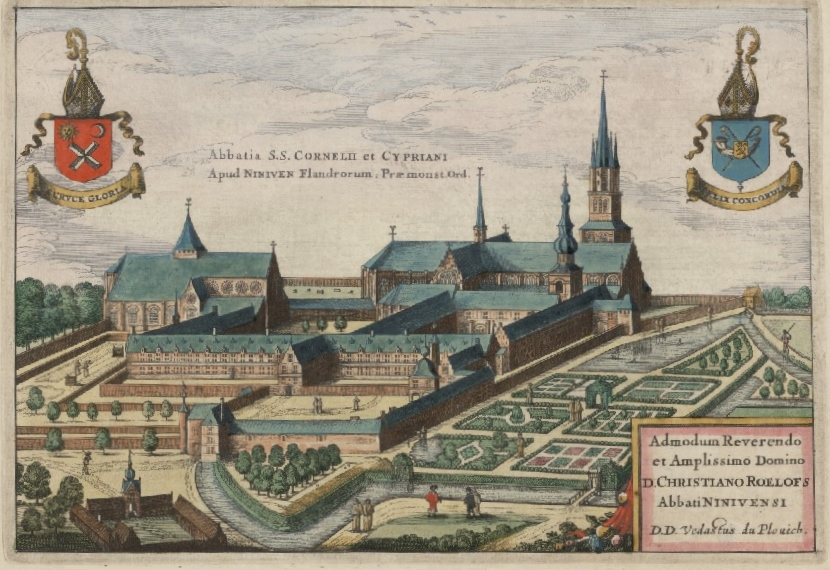
St Cornelius Abbey

The Premonstratensian abbot of Park Abbey founded the Abbey of Saints Cornelius and Cyprian in 1137. The monks settled on uncultivated lands which had been offered to them by the lord of Ninove which were near the town, on the banks of the river Dender. The community continued to grow and its financial position soon allowed it to occupy the adjacent parishes. The lay brothers undertook the farm work. Because of its large landholdings, the abbey soon became one of the biggest grain producers in Flanders. The 16th and 17th centuries were difficult times because of the political troubles and the effects of the French wars of religion on the Southern Netherlands. The 18th century brought a period of calm and prosperity. All the abbey buildings were reconstructed to the plans of a Ghent architect advised by Laurent-Benoît Dewez. The abbey was suppressed in 1796 during the French Revolution. The abbey community was able to buy it back but this process lasted until 1822. Many of the buildings were demolished during the first half of the 19th century. The abbey church became the parish church of the Assumption of Mary in 1813.

== City politics ==
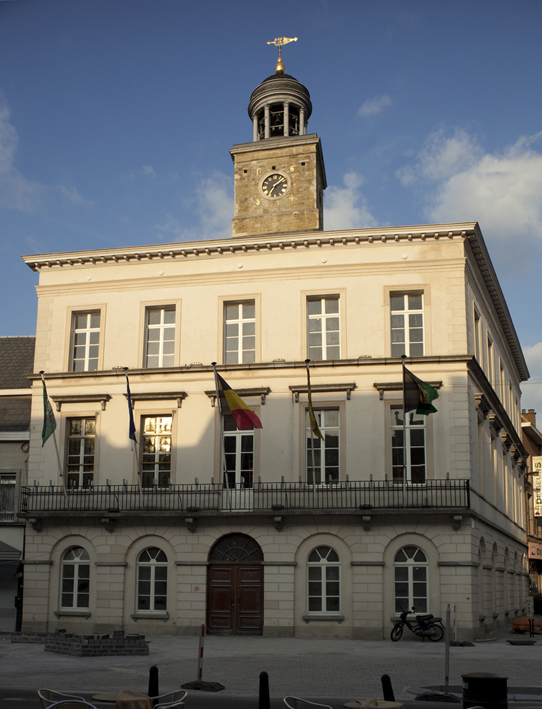
Ninove old town hall

Since 1 November 2015, the mayor of Ninove has been Tania De Jonge (Open VLD). The city council currently has 33 members, and is composed as follows:

- Open VLD – 9 seats
- Forza Ninove (Vlaams Belang) – 15 seats
- Samen (SP.a-Groen – CD&V) – 7 seats
- N-VA – 2 seats

=== 2001–2007 ===
CD&V and N-VA had allied themselves for the 2000 election, and formed a coalition with the VLD. Due to the increase of population, the threshold of 35,000 inhabitants had been passed and Ninove saw an increase from 31 to 33 council members for the communal elections, which were held on Sunday 8 October 2006.

The municipal elections on 8 October 2006 let the VLD retain its 12 seats, the CD&V win a seat, giving them a total of 8, the Vlaams Belang double its seats, giving them a total of 8, the socialist party PRO Ninove lose a seat, making a total of 4, and the Green Party hold their single seat. The coalition between VLD and CD&V was renewed, but without the N-VA.

=== 2007–2012 ===
During the 2 January 2007 elections of the OCMW council, one member of the VLD fraction voted for a candidate of Vlaams Belang, making the VLD lose 1 seat. After an investigation led by the local chapter of the VLD, it was announced that the person they suspected to be the culprit was Schepen Mariette De Smet. De Smet announced she would leave the VLD, but would remain in the council of the mayor and aldermen as an independent. Her colleagues in the council stripped her of all her duties, but after a few months she regained a few of them. On 9 January 2008 De Smet, fellow VLD schepen Corijn and another VLD member of the city council announced they were joining LDD, leaving the VLD-CD&V with a brittle one seat majority on the city council. The LDD alderman however elected to stay in the majority, making for a brittle coalition. On 5 May 2009 a Vlaams Belang councilmember defected to the LDD. In 2009 mayor Luc Durant announced he would resign for health reasons. He was replaced in September by Michel Casteur. In 2010 another VB councilmember left the party to become an independent. In January 2011 Mariette De Smet announced she would join the Vlaams Belang lead chartel list "Forza Ninove" and left LDD. She was then again stripped of her duties by her fellow aldermen. On 27 July 2011 De Smet was murdered in a murder-suicide by a friend of her husband. She was replaced as alderman by a member of the VLD. In 2012 the local LDD disbanded with its members either joining Forza Ninove or N-VA.

=== 2013–2018 ===
The municipal elections on 14 October 2012 saw the ruling VLD-CD&V-LDD coalition head for electoral defeat as the VLD (9) lost three and the CD&V (4) lost four seats. Vlaams Belang, under the cartel name "Forza Ninove", won a seat, giving them a total of 9. The socialist party SP.a and the Green Party formed a chartel and won six seats. N-VA won 5 seats.

After the negotiations between Open VLD, SP.a-Groen and N-VA collapsed, the coalition between Open VLD and CD&V was renewed but expanded with SP.a-Groen. N-VA, claiming election irregularities by CD&V and "Forza Ninove", launched and won an administrative appeal. This ruling vacated the election results and ordered new elections to be held. Open VLD, CD&V and SP.a-Groen appealed this ruling to the Council of State which in February 2013 subsequently overthrew the previous ruling and restored the election results. The new city council and aldermen were finally inaugurated on 25 February 2013. On 1 November 2015 mayor Casteur stood down and was replaced by Tania De Jonge.

=== 2019–2024 ===
The municipal elections on 14 October 2018 saw Forza Ninove win a landslide victory with 40% of the vote, winning 15 seats (+6). Open VLD retained its 9 seats, SAMEN (a cartel of socialists, greens and Christian-democrats) won 7 seats. N-VA won 2 seats (−3). Forza was unable to form a majority coalition, and ultimately Open VLD and SAMEN combined with one councillor from N-VA who sits as an independent to form a majority.

=== 2024–present ===
In the 2024 Belgian local elections, Forza Ninove won an absolute majority in the municipality, leading to Guy d'Haeseleer becoming the first-ever Vlaams Belang mayor.

=== List of former mayors ===
- 1793–1801 – L. Van Ypersele
- 1802–1814 – Geeraard Germanes
- 1815–1824 – M. Van Ypersele
- 1825–1830 – Joseph Cools
- 1831–1854 – Karel Van Ypersele
- 1855–1863 – Victor Van Oudenhove
- 1864–1869 – Edmond De Deyn
- 1870–1871 – Pieter Soetens
- 1872–1894 – August De Cooman
- 1895–1911 – Edmond De Deyn
- 1912 – Victor Van Impe
- 1913–1940 – Clément Behn
- 1941–1944 – Karel Dortant
- 1945 – Clément Behn
- 1946–1954 – Omer Van Trimpont (BSP)
- 1955–1976 – Emiel Milo (BSP)
- 1977–1994 – Etienne Cosyns (CL – Centrumlijst)
- 1995–2000 – Louis Waltniel (Banier)
- 2001–2009 – Luc Durant (VLD)
- 2009–2015 – Michel Casteur (Open VLD)
- 2015–2024– Tania De Jonge (Open VLD)

== Nicknames ==
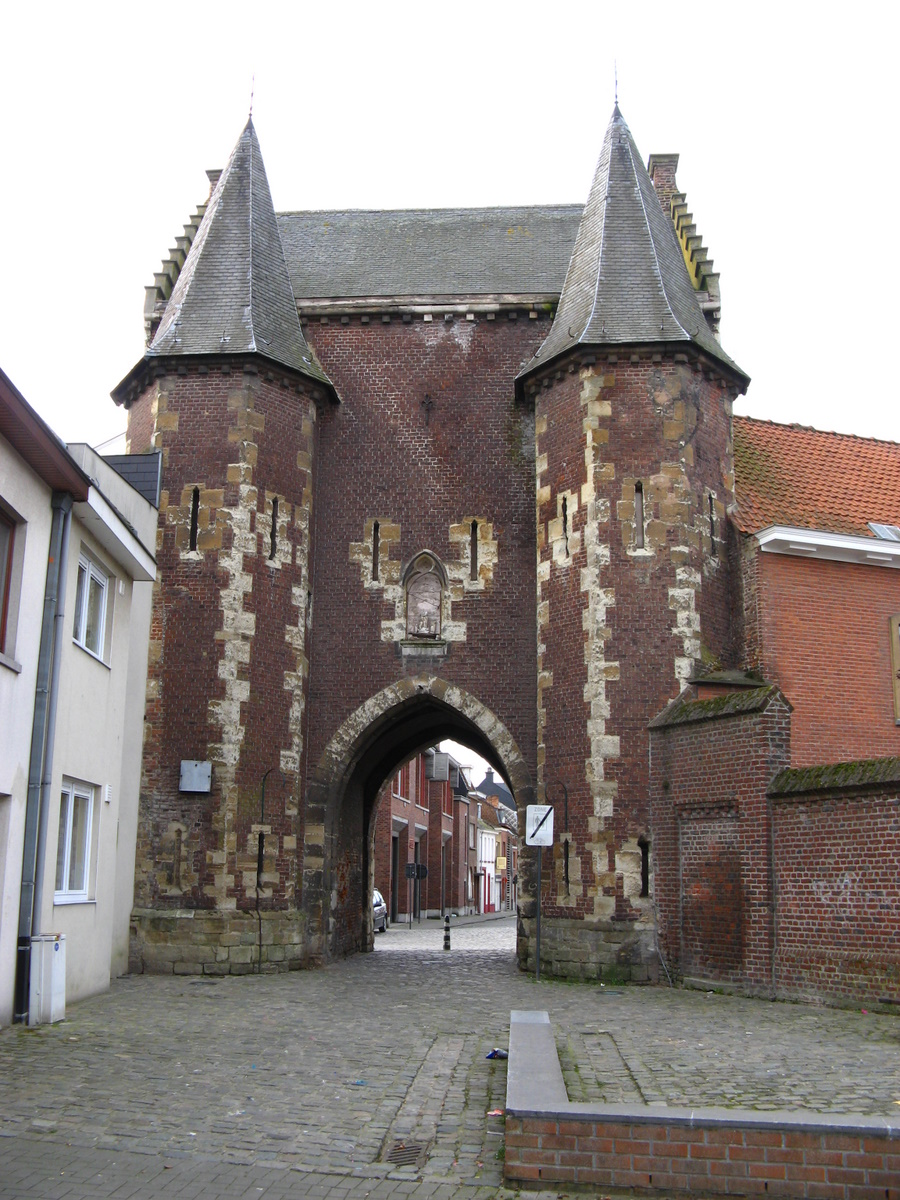
The Koepoort city gate

Throughout the ages the inhabitants of Ninove were given various nicknames as a title of honour or mockery.

=== Wortelmannen or Wortels ===
The inhabitants were given the title of "wortelmannen" or "wortels" (Dutch for carrot people or carrot) because of an event during the Middle Ages. During a row with the neighbouring city of Aalst, the people of Aalst decided to besiege Ninove. The inhabitants of Ninove were completely surprised by this attack and were found unprepared. In all the confusion the key to close the city gate could not be found. To bolt the gate, a carrot was used. A passing donkey saw the carrot-bolt and ate it, leaving the city gate unbolted and the militiamen from Aalst free entry of the city.

=== De Oudste, de Stoutste en de Wijste der Steden ===
Ninove was described by Antonius Sanderus as the Oldest, the Boldest and the Wisest of Cities. Sanderus wrote in his Flandria Illustrata:

"Ninive quattor habet portas. Hae portae, quamvis possint, vix umquam clauduntur: unde vulgari loco Ninove dicitur antiquissima, audaccissima, sapientissima".

Ninove was called the oldest because of the similarity of its name with the ancient Assyrian city Nineveh, the boldest because it waited on the enemy with open gates and the wisest because the city had no jester or town fool, if one was needed a fool from a neighbouring town was lent.

== Media ==
=== Newspapers ===
Ninove is the home of independent digital news outlet Ninofmedia. Founded in 2013, Ninofmedia primarily covers news in Ninove and other surrounding areas in the Denderstreek.

=== Radio ===
Since March 2021, Radio Ninove (95 FM) has been operating as a local radio station licensed to serve Ninove. It was founded by experienced radio hosts who had previously worked at other radio stations in East Flanders, primarily in the city of Aalst. Radio Ninove aims to be a "partner in life" of Ninove's residents and local businesses by covering regional news, sports, politics, culture, and other important topics and events.

The predecessor to Radio Ninove—a station of the same name—was active during the 1980s.

Radio Ninove is involved in a close partnership with enkaavee, a radio station dedicated entirely to the Carnival of Ninove.

== People ==
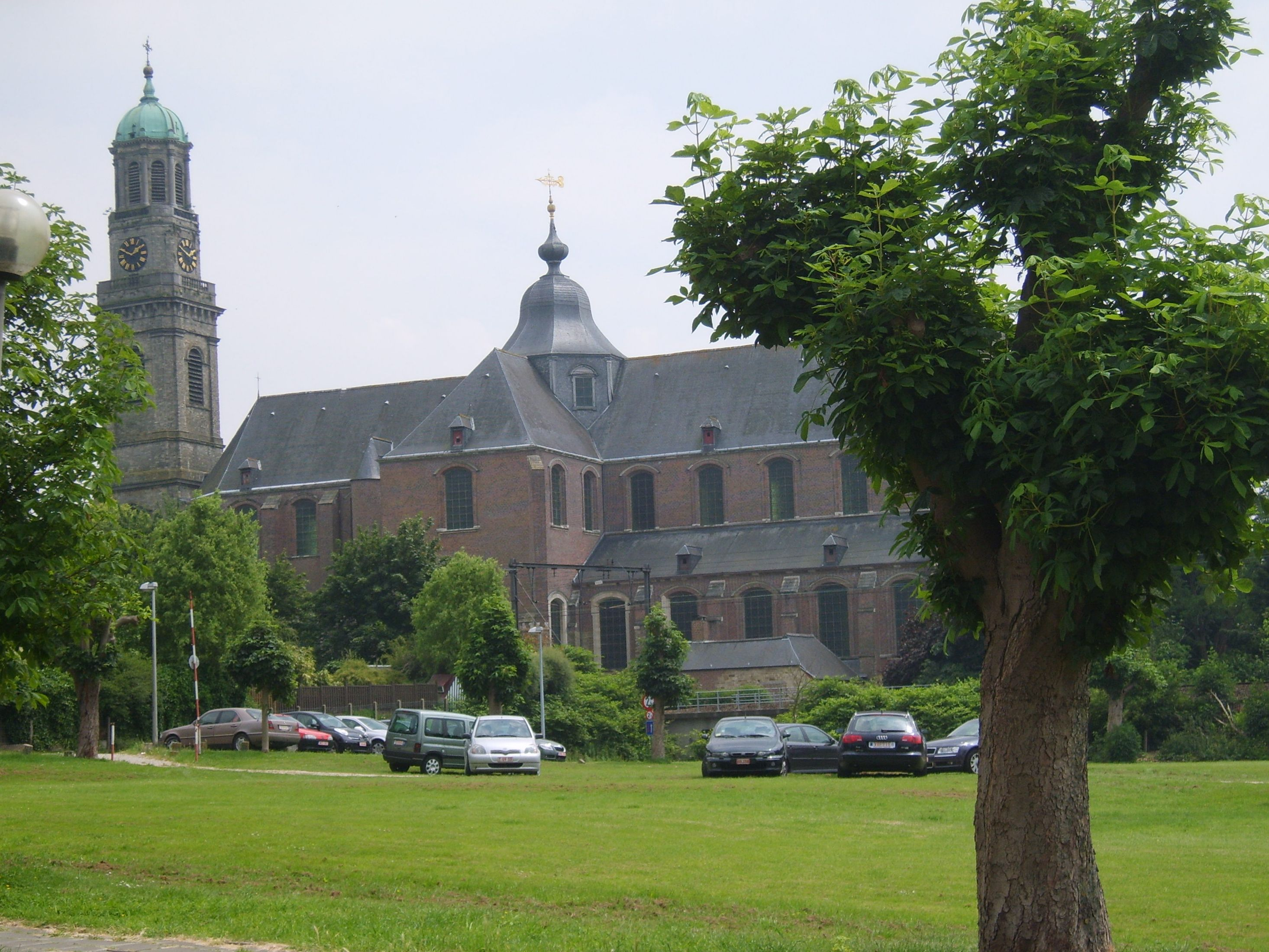
The Abbey church of Ninove

- Johannes Despauterius (ca.1480–1520), Flemish humanist
- Anthoni Schoonjans (1655–1726), painter
- Frans Hemerijckx (1902–1969), physician, worked among lepers in the Belgian Congo and India
- Louis Waltniel (1925–2001), liberal politician and industrialist
- Willy Roggeman (born 1934), writer and jazz musician
- Rudy De Leeuw (born 1953), chairman ABVV
- Johan Evenepoel (born 1965), Belgian composer

=== Sports ===
- Romain Gijssels (1907–1978), professional road bicycle racer
- Wesley Sonck (born 1978), former football player of the Belgium national team
- Geert De Vos (born 1981), is a Belgian dart player who plays for the British Darts Organisation
- Kevin van der Perren (born 1982), ice skater, 9th at the Winter Olympics
- Laurens de Plus (born 1995), professional road bicycle racer
