= James Kirkwood =

James Kirkwood may refer to:

- James Kirkwood (Church of Scotland) (1650–1709), promoter of Scottish Gaelic language literacy
- James P. Kirkwood (1807–1877), American civil engineer
- James Kirkwood Sr. (1875–1963), American actor and film director
- James Kirkwood Jr. (1924–1989), American playwright and author
- Jimmy Kirkwood (field hockey) (born 1962), field hockey player from Northern Ireland
- James Kirkwood (grammarian) (fl. 1698), Scottish grammarian
- James Kirkwood (sport shooter) (born 1930), Australian Olympic shooter
- James Kirkwood (politician) (1845–1933), politician in Ontario, Canada
