= Ninove Abbey =

- Abdijkerk
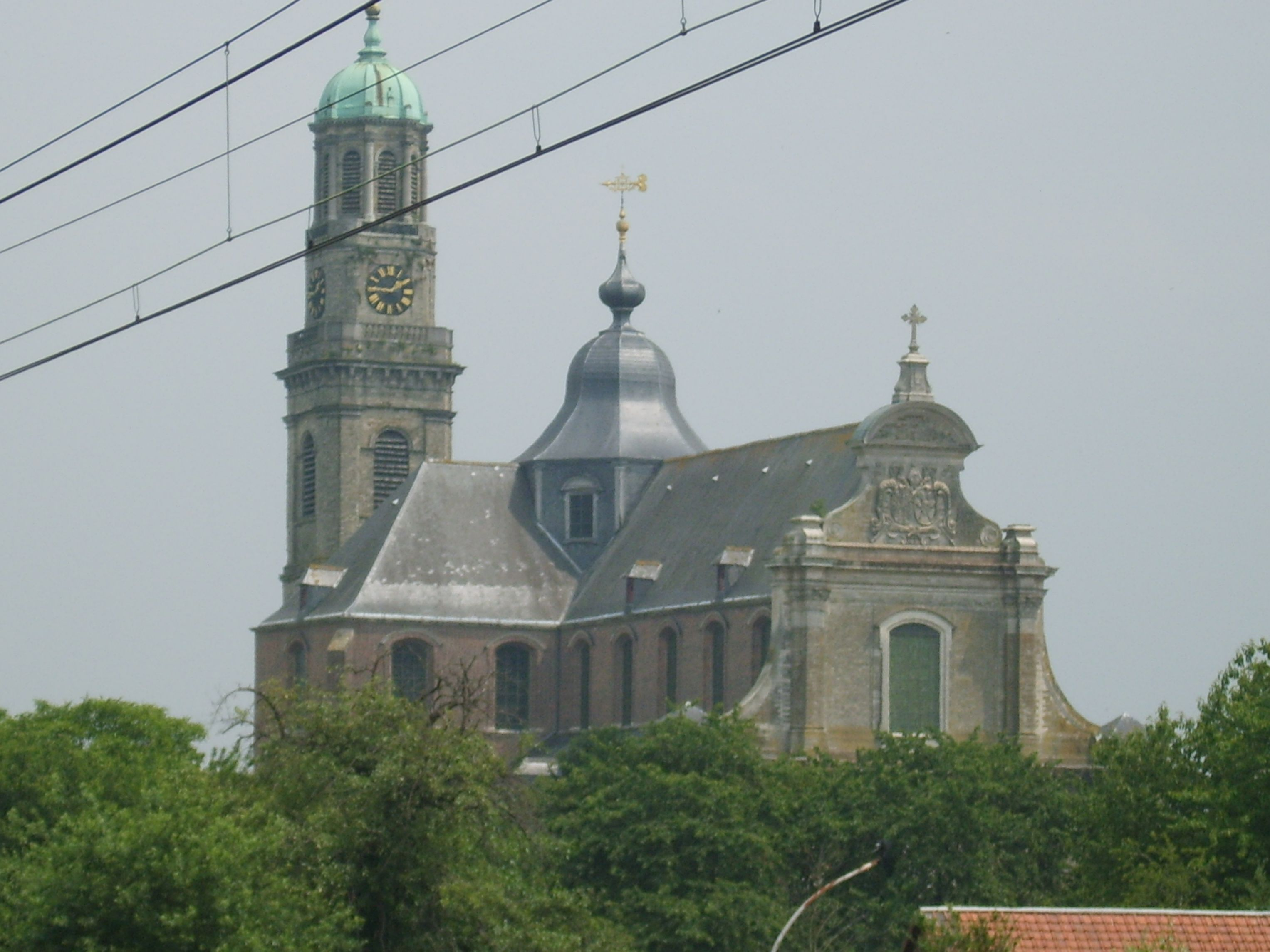
- Former abbey church (Abdijkerk) of Ninove

- Location within Belgium
- 50°54′00″N 4°01′12″E
- Location: Ninove
- Country: Belgium
- Denomination: Catholic
- Religious order: Premonstratensian

History
- Founded: 1137
- Founder(s): Gerard I, Lord of Ninove

Architecture
- Style: Baroque and Neoclassical

Ninove Abbey (Dutch: Abdij van Sint-Cornelius en Sint-Cyprianus) was a monastery of the Premonstratensian Order in the center of Ninove, in the province of East Flanders, Belgium. Only the abbey church now remains.

The parish church at Ninove was converted into a Premonstratensian Abbey in 1137 by Gerard I, Lord of Ninove, in remembrance of his wife Gisela and himself. The abbey was a filiation from Park Abbey outside Leuven.

The monks settled on uncultivated lands which had been offered to them by the lord of Ninove which were near the town, on the banks of the river Dender. The community continued to grow and its financial position soon allowed it to occupy the adjacent parishes. The lay brothers undertook the farm work.

The original abbey church was dedicated in 1174 and was built in Romano-Gothic style. Between 1578 and 1580, the church and abbey buildings were severely damaged. The remains of the church were demolished in 1623. A temporary chapel was built in 1635. The construction of the current Baroque church started in 1640, after Abbot Jan David brought back the plan for construction from Rome in 1628. Due to financing problems, however, the works did not progress for decades. It was not until 1716 that construction was resumed. The church was consecrated on 27 April 1727. The organ was manufactured in 1728 by the famous organ builder Jean-Baptiste Forceville.

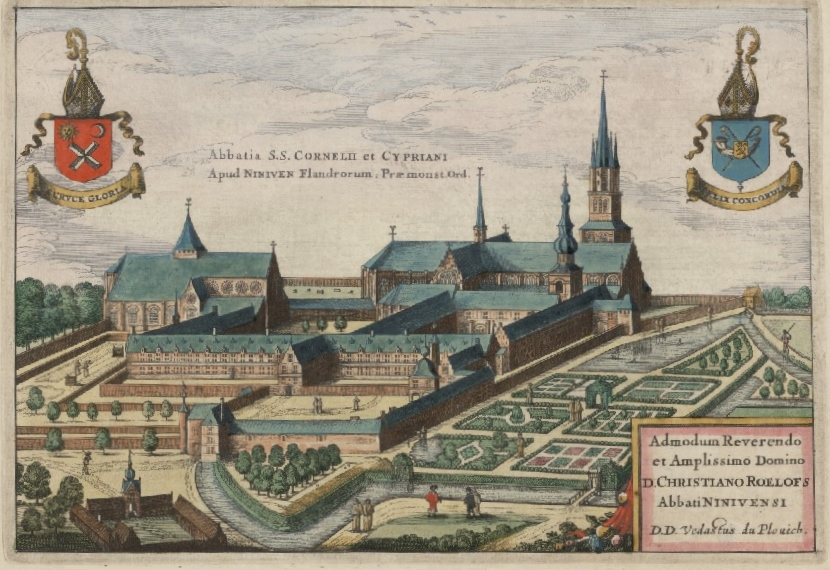
The Abbey in the early 17th century. The image is taken from Flandria Illustrata of 1641

The 16th and 17th centuries were difficult times because of the political troubles and the effects of the Eighty Years' War. The 18th century brought a period of calm and prosperity. All the abbey buildings were reconstructed to the plans of Ghent architects Jan Baptist Simoens and Frans Drieghe, advised by Laurent-Benoît Dewez.

The Abbey was suppressed on 1 February 1796 during the French period. At the request of the local people, the abbey church was converted for use as a parish church in 1813, with a dedication to the Assumption of Mary. Most of the abbey buildings were demolished in the 1820s, with the main remnant being a monumental gate.
