= Johannes Thomas Forceville =

Belgian organ builder (1696–1750)

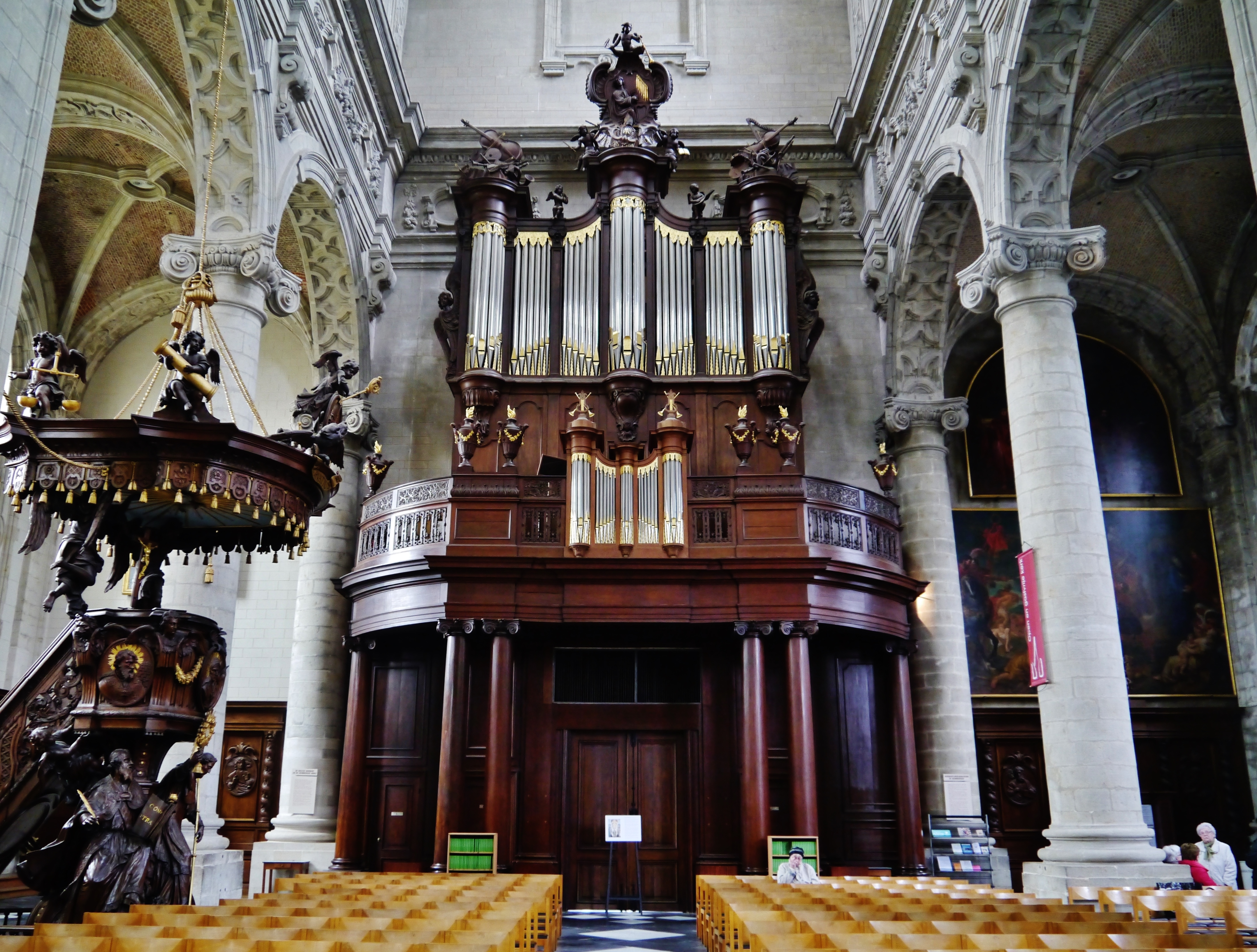
Organ of the Basilica of Saint Servatius in Grimbergen

Johannes Thomas Forceville (1696–1750) was an organ builder and son of the famous organ builder Johannes Baptist Forceville (1660–1739). He is therefore often called "the younger".

== Biography ==
Johannes Thomas Forceville was born in Antwerp, where he was baptized on 5 July 1696. He was the son of Jean-Baptist, the first organ builder of the Forceville family who had moved to Antwerp from Saint-Omer, and his first wife Magdalena Cannaert. He received his education mainly from his father during the construction of the organ for the Church of St. Michael and St. Gudula in Brussels between 1706 and 1718. In the period 1711–1713 he also collaborated with his father on the construction of the organ in the Saint Lambert Church in Ekeren.

Brussels remained his chief area of activity. He started working autonomously since at least 1734, when he restored the organ of the Church of Our Lady of Laeken in association with Egide Le Blas. He returned to the atelier of his father in 1737, succeeding him in the works for the Chapelle royale of Brussels. He delivered a new organ with eight registers in Wolvertem (Saint Laurentius Church, 1744). He died in 1750 while working on a larger commission in the Basilica of Saint Servatius in Grimbergen. This organ was finished by Jean-Baptiste Goynaut.

== See also ==
- Forceville (organ builders)
