= Johannes Despauterius =

Flemish humanist

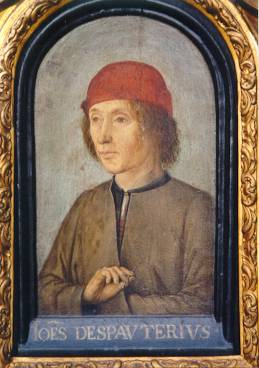
Johannes Despauterius.

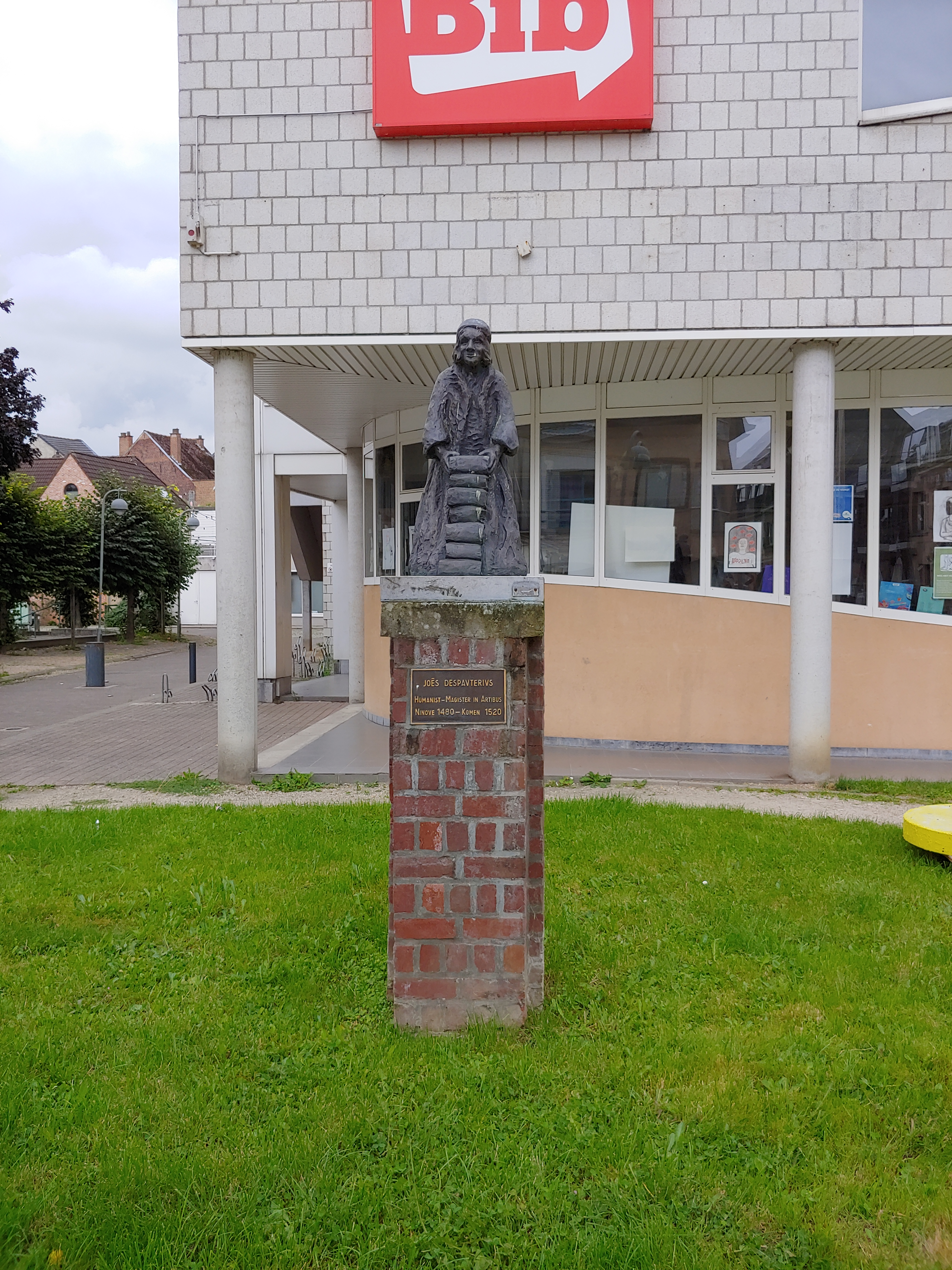
Statue of Despauterius in Ninove.

Jan de Spauter (Ninove, c. 1480 – Komen, 1520) was a prominent Flemish humanist. His name was Latinized to Johannes Despauterius as was common in the Renaissance.

== Life ==
At the age of 18 Despauterius went to the humanistic college De Lelie in Leuven where he studied for three years. In Leuven he became a Master of Arts: which meant he had studied and mastered Latin grammar, rhetorica, dialectica, musica, arithmica, geometrica and astronomica.

After his studies he started teaching.

== Works ==
After several years of teaching experience, Despauterius published books on Latin grammar: Syntaxis, Ars versificatoria, Grammatica pars prima and Ortographia. They became the standard works of reference for the study of Latin for the following centuries in Western Europe.

== Legacy ==
At the end of the 17th century, James Kirkwood was asked what he thought of the Latin grammar of Despauter. He replied that if some defects were remedied, it could be made excellent. He was commissioned to make a revision, which appeared as Grammatica Despauteriana in 1695, followed by several later editions. Thomas Ruddiman's grammar of 1714 is considered to have superseded it.
