= Prémontré Abbey =

Abbey in Aisne, France

Coordinates: 49°32′50″N 3°24′38″E

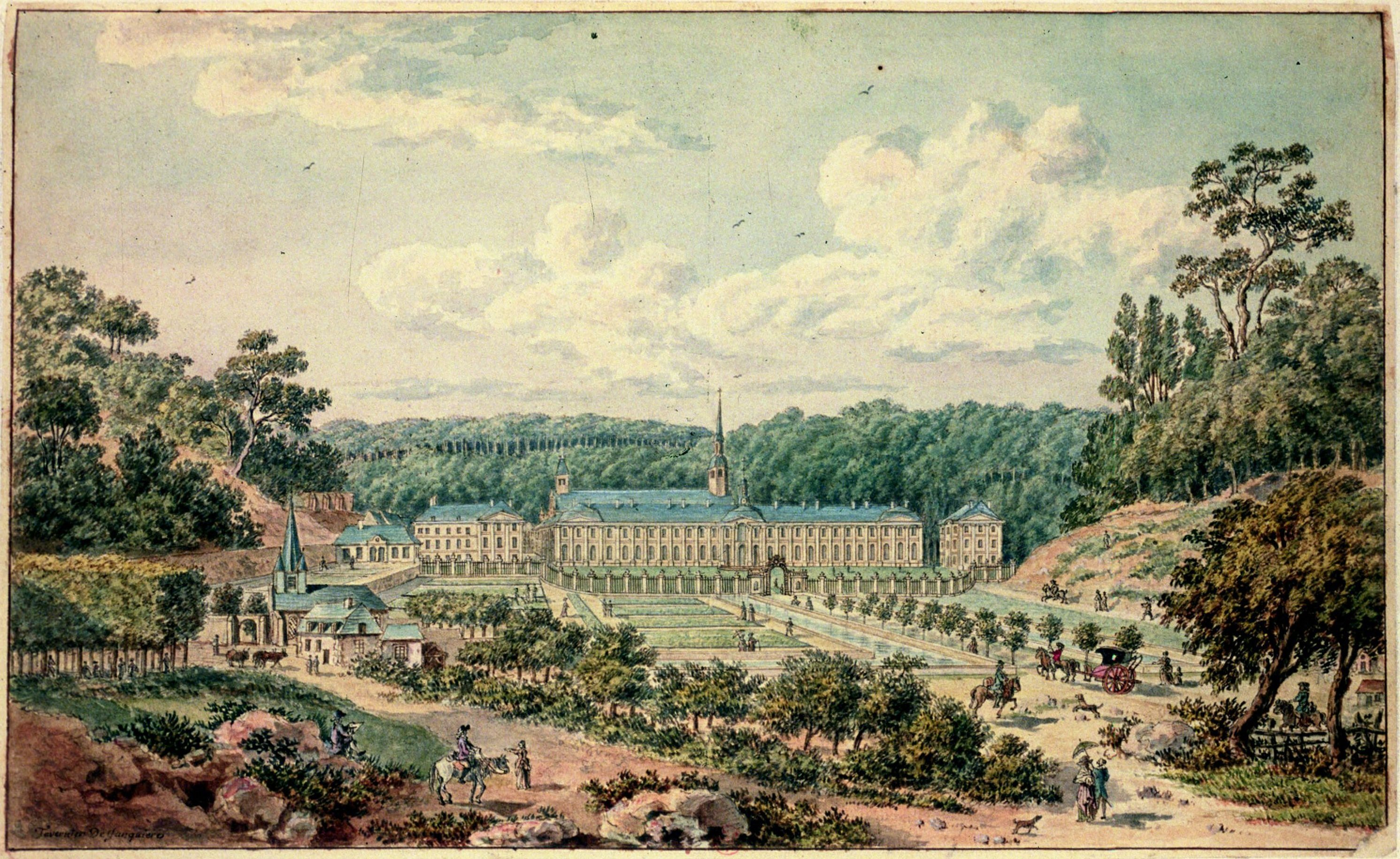
Prémontré Abbey, by Tavernier de Joniquières, pen and watercolour, 1780s

Prémontré Abbey was the mother house of the Premonstratensian Order and was located at Prémontré about twelve miles west of Laon, département of Aisne, France.

== History ==
It was founded by Saint Norbert of Xanten in 1120 on waste land that had previously belonged to the Abbey of St. Vincent, Laon, to which it had been given by a former Bishop of Laon; the monks of St. Vincent's had tried in vain to cultivate it. As shown in the charter of donation the place was called "Præmonstratus", or "pratum monstratum", probably from a clearing (pré or meadow) made in the forest. The name, however, easily lent itself to the adapted meaning of "locus praemonstratus", "a place foreshown", as for example in the life of Godfrey of Cappenberg, one of Norbert's first disciples (1127):

"Venit ad locum vere juxta nomen suum, a Domino premonstratum, electum et prædestinatum" ("He came to a place truly according to its [very] name foreshown, elect and predestined of the Lord").

The founding tradition says that the Bishop of Laon and Norbert visited Prémontré about the middle of January and that the bishop gave the white habit to Norbert on 25 January, the feast of the Conversion of Saint Paul. At the conclusion of the Council of Liège (1131), Pope Innocent II and Norbert came to Laon and stayed with Bishop Bartholomew. They also visited Prémontré Abbey and were delighted to see some five hundred religious – priests, clerics, and lay-brothers – all united in the observance of their duties under Abbot Hugh of Fosse. It was the original Premonstratensian custom to establish double monasteries, but in the general chapter of 1141 it was decided to remove the convents of nuns to at least one league's distance from the abbeys of men. Hugh died on 10 February 1161, and was succeeded by Philip, then Abbot of Belval in the Forest of Argonne. Abbot John II founded in 1252 a college or house of studies for Norbertine clerics at the University of Paris.

At the death of Virgilius, forty-third Abbot General of Prémontré, Cardinal Francis of Pisa had intrigued so much at the Court of Rome that he succeeded in being named commendatory abbot of Prémontré, and in 1535 took possession of the abbey and all its revenues. Cardinal Francis was succeeded by Cardinal Ippolito d'Este, the papal legate in France, who also held the abbey in commendam until he died in 1572. The historian of the abbey Charles Taiée calls these two cardinals "les fléaux de Prémontré" ("the scourges of Prémontré").

After the death of Cardinal d'Este a free election was held and Jean Des Pruets, Doctor of the Sorbonne, an earnest and zealous priest, was elected, and his election confirmed by Pope Gregory XIII, 14 December 1572. With great ability Des Pruets undertook the difficult task of repairing the financial losses and of promoting conventual discipline at Prémontré and other houses of the order. He died on 15 May 1596, and was succeeded by two further zealous abbots, Longpré and Gosset; but the latter was succeeded by Cardinal Richelieu, as commendatory abbot.

The last abbot general, L'Ecuy, was elected in 1781. At the French Revolution the abbey was suppressed and confiscated, and the site sold to a certain Cagnon, who demolished several buildings and sold the material. It was converted into a potassium and saltpetre factory by a wealthy glass manufacturer in the early 1790s. Having passed through several hands, the property was bought by Paul-Armand de Cardon de Garsignies, Bishop of Soissons, whose successor sold it to the Département of Aisne, by whom the buildings were converted into an asylum or psychiatric hospital.

== Buildings ==
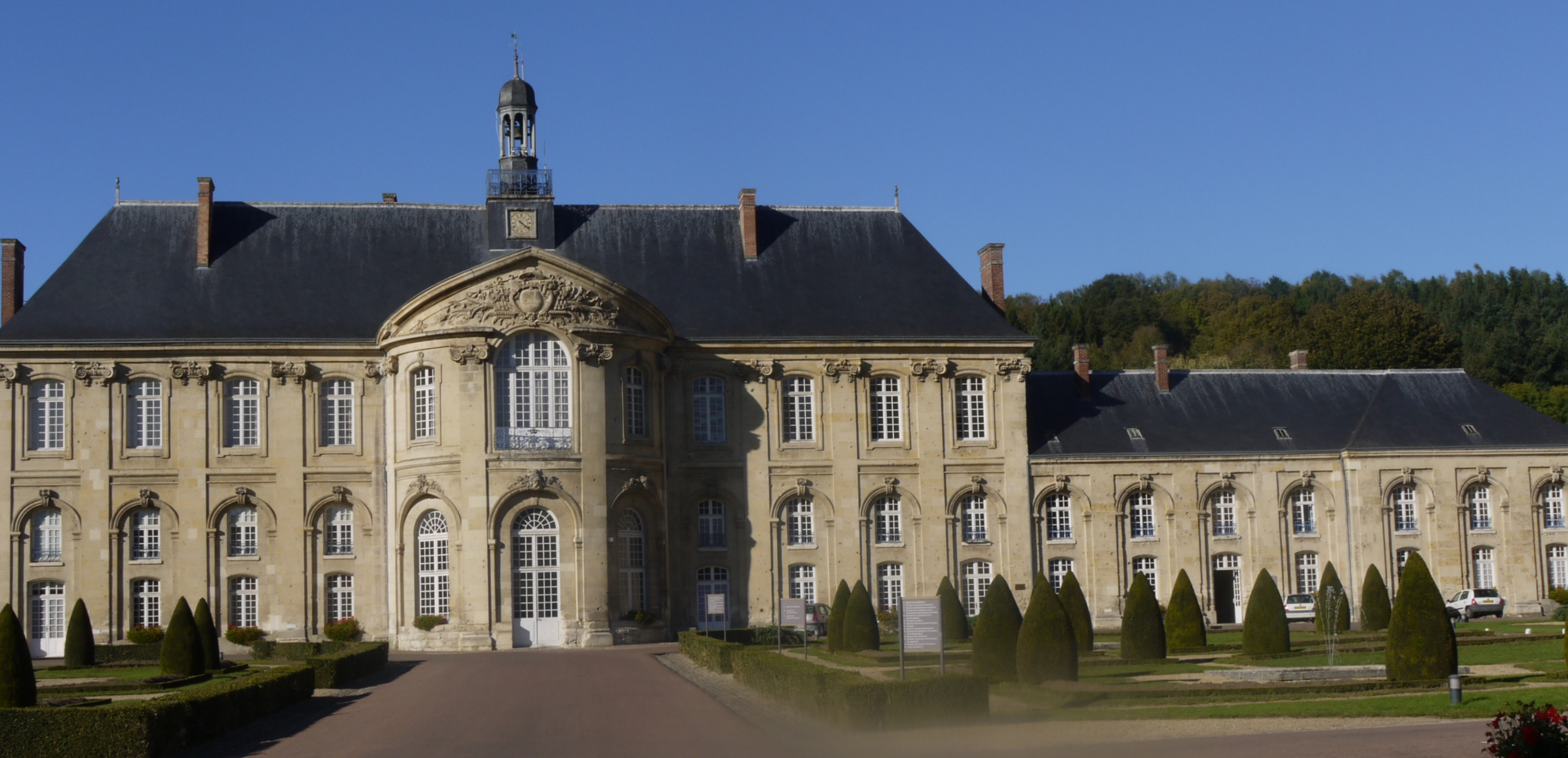
Former abbey building now in use as a hospital

Of the old abbey as it was from the 12th to the 16th centuries hardly anything remains, but three large buildings of the 17th and 18th centuries are still standing, part of one of which is used as a church, dedicated to Saint Norbert. Most of the site is still in use as the psychiatric hospital founded in 1867.

== List of abbots ==
- 1128–1161 : Hugues I de Fosses
- 1161–1171 : Philippe I de Reims
- 1171 : Jean I de Brienne
- 1171–1174 : Eudes
- 1174–1189 : Hugues II
- 1189–1191 : Robert I
- 1191–1195 : Gautier
- 1195–1201 : Pierre I de Saint-Médard
- 1201–1203 : Baudouin
- 1203–1204 : Vermond
- 1204–1206 : Guillaume I de Saint-Omer
- 1206–1209 : Robert II
- 1209–1220 : Gervais
- 1220–1233 : Conrad Suève
- 1233–1228 : Guillaume II d'Angles
- 1238–1242 : Hugues III d'Hirson
- 1242–1247 : Conon
- 1247–1269 : Jean II de Rocquigny
- 1269–1278 : Guerric
- 1278–1281 : Gilles van Biervliet
- 1282–1287 : Guy
- 1287–1288 : Robert III
- 1288–1304 : Guillaume III de Louvignies
- 1304–1327 : Adam I de Crécy
- 1327–1333 : Adam II de Wassignies
- 1333–1339 : Jean III de Châtillon
- 1339–1352 : Jean IV Le Petit de Saint-Quentin
- 1352–1367 : Jean V de Roigny
- 1368 : Stéphane
- 1368–1381 : Pierre II de Froidsaints
- 1381–1391 : Jean VI de Marle
- 1391–1409 : Jean VII
- 1409–1423 : Pierre III d'Hermi
- 1423–1436 : Jean VIII de Marle
- 1436–1443 : Jean IX de La Fère
- 1443–1449 : Pierre IV Rodier
- 1449–1458 : Jean X Aguet
- 1458–1470 : Simon de La Terrière
- 1470–1497 : Hubert I de Monthermé
- 1497–1512 : Jean XI de L'Ecluse
- 1512–1512 : Jean XII Evrard
- 1512–1531 : Jean XIII Bachimont
- 1531–1533 : Virgile de Limoges
- 1533–1533 : Michel Ier Coupson
- 1533–1562 : Francesco Pisani
  1533–1537 : Jean de Folembray, vicar
  1537–1562 : Josse Coquerel, vicar
- 1562–1572 : Ippolito d'Este
  1565-1569 : Gilbert Tournebulle, vicar
  1569-1573 : Antoine Visconti, vicar
- 1573–1596 : Jean XIV Despruets
- 1596–1613 : François II de Longpré
- 1613–1635 : Pierre V Gosset
- 1635–1636 : Pierre VI Desban
- 1636–1642 : Armand-Jean du Plessis de Richelieu
- 1643–1644 : Simon Raguet
- 1645–1666 : Augustin I Le Scellier
- 1667–1702 : Michel II de Colbert-Terron
- 1702–1702 : Philippe II Celers
- 1702–1740 : Claude-Honoré-Luc de Muin
- 1740–1741 : Augustin II de Rocquevert
- 1741–1757 : Bruno Bécourt
- 1758–1769 : Antoine Parchappe de Vinay
- 1769–1780 : Guillaume IV Manoury
- 1780–1790 : Jean-Baptiste L'Écuy
