= Tanchelm =

Medieval itinerant preacher (died 1115)

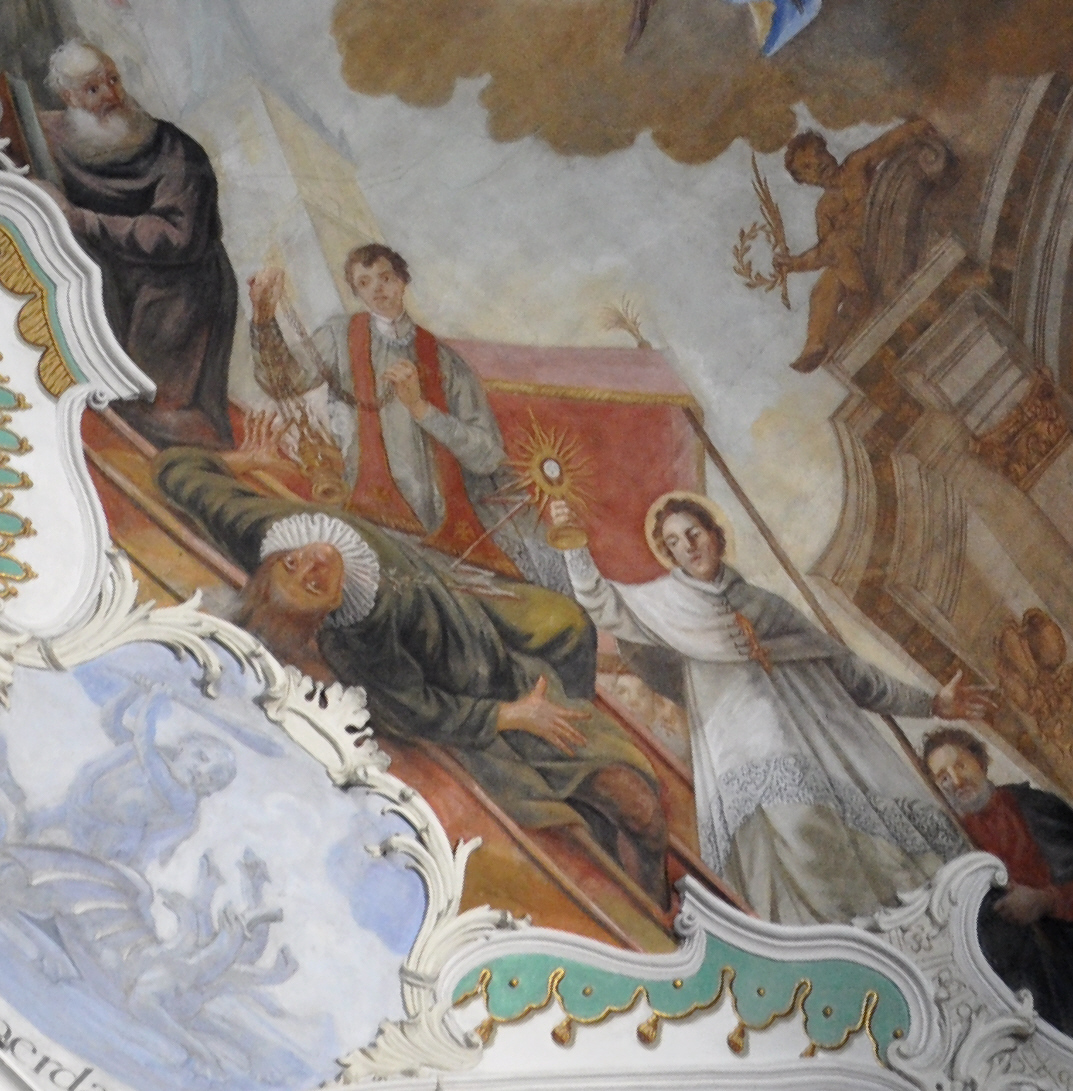
Norbert of Xanten fighting the heretical preacher Tanchelm; fresco by Johannes Zick in the church of Schussenried Abbey

Tanchelm (approx. 1070 - Antwerp, 1115), also known as Tanchelm of Antwerp, Tanchelijn, Tanquelin or Tanchelin, was an itinerant preacher critical of the established Roman Catholic church, active in the Low Countries around the beginning of the 12th century.

== History ==
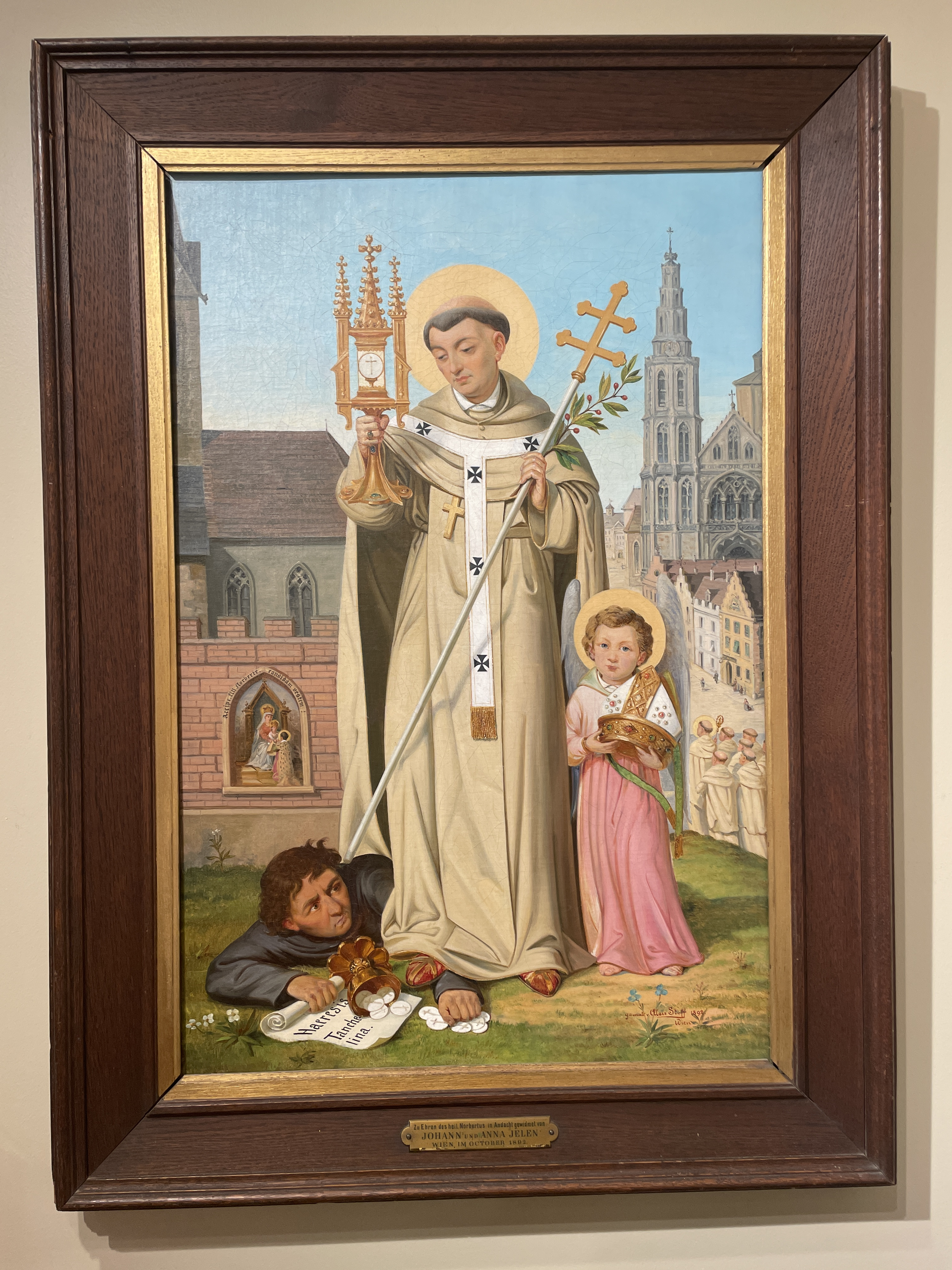
A painting of the defeat of Tanchelm by Norbert.

Tanchelm was supposed to have been a monk, perhaps from the circle of Count Robert II of Flanders (1092–1111). From 1112 he preached in Antwerp, the Duchy of Brabant, Flanders and Zeeland against the official church and its hierarchy, and against the Real Presence in the Eucharist. He opposed the payment of tithes and condemned those priests who lived with women.

He was apparently also in Rome, where he is supposed to have campaigned, in vain, for an extension of the Bishopric of Thérouanne to cover the islands of the Scheldt. He was briefly put under arrest in Cologne in 1113–1114 but released again, despite the vigorous protests of the cathedral clergy of Utrecht. In 1115, he was slain by a priest while on a water journey.

The followers of Tanchelm, who is reported to have allowed them to drink his bathwater, were still to be found for a period after his death in Antwerp; in 1124 Saint Norbert of Xanten preached against them.

Tanchelm prefigured ideas in the Protestant reformation.

== Controversy about his views ==
The negative information regarding Tanchelm has been contained in no more than two documents:

- a letter written by canons of the cathedral of Utrecht,
- a postmortem memorandum written by followers of saint Norbert.

As both these documents were written by enemies of Tanchelm and no contradictory documents have emerged, professor Henri Pirenne put question marks behind the accusations and formulated another thesis.

He theorized that Tanchelm was a collaborator of the count of Flanders and, like his master, took sides with the Pope regarding the investiture controversy. By acting so, he was declared an enemy by the bishop and the canons of Utrecht, who had taken sides with the Holy Roman Emperor. Hence the fierce opposition and the slanderous accusations against him and, in the end, his assassination.

== Sources ==
- Henri PIRENNE, Tanchelin et le projet de démembrement du diocèse d'Utrecht vers 1100, in: Bulletin des Classes des lettres et des sciences morales et politiques de l'Académie royale de Belgique, 1927.
- Beulertz, S. (ed. ) 1999: Tanchelm, in: Lexikon des Mittelalters, vol. 8, col. 455. Stuttgart-Weimar
- Cohn, Norman 1958: The Pursuit of the Millennium: Revolutionary Millenarism and Mystical Anarchists of the Middle Ages. Secker & Warburg.
