= Sam Kirkwood =

Irish footballer

Personal information
- Full name: Samuel James Kirkwood
- Date of birth: 31 July 1910
- Place of birth: Belfast, Ireland
- Date of death: 1980 (aged 69–70)
- Height: 5 ft 10 in (1.78 m)
- Position: Defender

Senior career*
| Years | Team | Apps | (Gls) |
| – | Cookstown Hurst | | |
| – | Portadown | | |
| 1933–1934 | Arsenal | 0 | (0) |
| 1934–1940 | Plymouth Argyle^{[A]} | 109 | (1) |
| 1940–194? | Linfield | | |
- * Club domestic league appearances and goals

Samuel James Kirkwood (31 July 1910 – 1980) was an Irish professional footballer who made 109 appearances in the Football League playing for Plymouth Argyle. He played as a defender.

Kirkwood was born in Belfast. He played for Portadown of the Irish Football League before coming to England to join Arsenal. After failing to break through to the first team he moved on to Plymouth Argyle, for whom he made his debut in the Football League in February 1935. He was a regular first-team member from the middle of the 1936–37 season onwards, but the Second World War put an end to his League career. He returned to Northern Ireland where he played for Linfield, and was selected in the Irish League representative team in 1940.

== Notes ==
A.: Joyce's total of 112 League games includes 3 played at the beginning of the 1939–40 season which was abandoned because of the Second World War.
