= Kirkwood, West Virginia =

Unincorporated community in West Virginia, US

Coordinates: 38°21′02″N 80°48′06″W

Kirkwood is an unincorporated community in Nicholas County, in the U.S. state of West Virginia.

== History ==
A post office called Kirkwood was established in 1902, and remained in operation until 1939. The community was named after an early settler.
