= Norbert of Xanten =

German Catholic bishop, founder of the Premonstratensian order

Saint Norbert of Xanten O. Praem
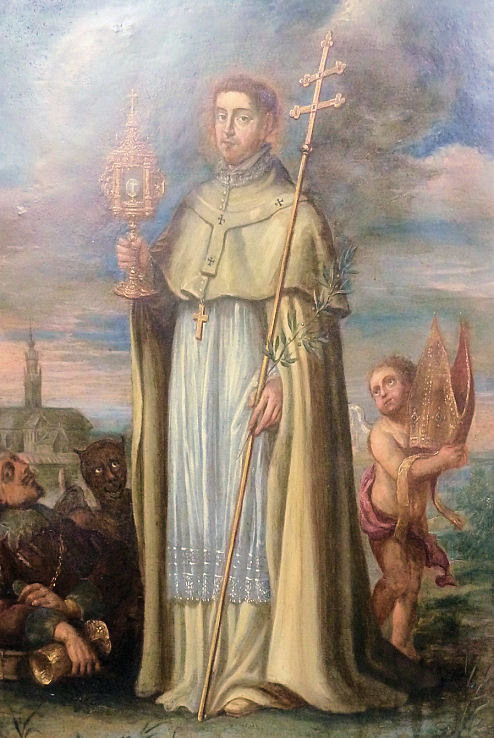
- Saint Norbert of Xanten, with St. Michael's Abbey, Antwerp

Bishop and Confessor
- Born: c. 1080; Gennep, Archbishopric of Cologne, Holy Roman Empire
- Died: 6 June 1134 (aged 58–59); Magdeburg, Archbishopric of Magdeburg
- Venerated in: Catholic Church
- Canonized: 28 July 1582, Rome by Pope Gregory XIII
- Feast: 6 June
- Attributes: monstrance; cross with two beams
- Patronage: Kingdom of Bohemia (now Czech Republic), invoked during childbirth for safe delivery; Magdeburg

Norbert of Xanten (c. 1080 – 6 June 1134), also known as Norbert Gennep, was a German Catholic bishop who was the Archbishop of Magdeburg, founder of the Premonstratensian order of canons regular, and is venerated as a saint in the Catholic Church. Norbert was canonized by Pope Gregory XIII in the year 1582, and his statue appears above the Piazza colonnade of St. Peter's Square in Rome.

== Early life ==
As the third son of a nobleman, Norbert's parents destined him for an ecclesiastical career. They made sure he was well educated, and he dutifully received minor orders as a subdeacon. He received a comfortable position as a canon at the church of St. Victor in Xanten. Holy Roman Emperor Henry V was impressed with Norbert and appointed him to the position of almoner. However, Norbert underwent a profound conversion after he was thrown from a horse when a bolt of lightning frightened the animal. Following this incident, he returned to Xanten and pursued a devout, penitent life.

== Early priesthood ==
Deeply repentant for his worldly way of life, Norbert began praying, fasting, and performing physical mortifications. When he preached against worldliness, the other canons of Xanten denounced him as an innovator at a 1118 synod in Fritzlar. He then resigned his benefice, sold all his property and gave the proceeds to the poor. He visited Pope Gelasius II, who gave him permission to become an itinerant preacher. Norbert and his earliest companions began their journey, walking in the snow in the middle of winter. However, while Norbert's zeal seemingly made him impervious to the cold, his earliest companions grew sick and died.

Norbert preached throughout lands in what is now western Germany, Belgium, the Netherlands and northern France, being credited with a number of miracles. In village after village, he encountered a demoralized clergy, lonely, often practicing concubinage and feeling that the official Church did not care about them.

In Paris, Norbert would have witnessed the Canons of St. Victor, who had adopted the ascetic ideals of William of Champeaux. At Clairvaux and Citeaux he would also have seen the Cistercian reforms among the monks. He became acquainted with the Cistercian administrative system that created an international federation of monasteries with fair amount of centralized power, though local houses had a certain amount of independence. These reforms, written up in their "Charter of Charity", would affect him significantly in his own future work.

== Canons Regular of Prémontré ==
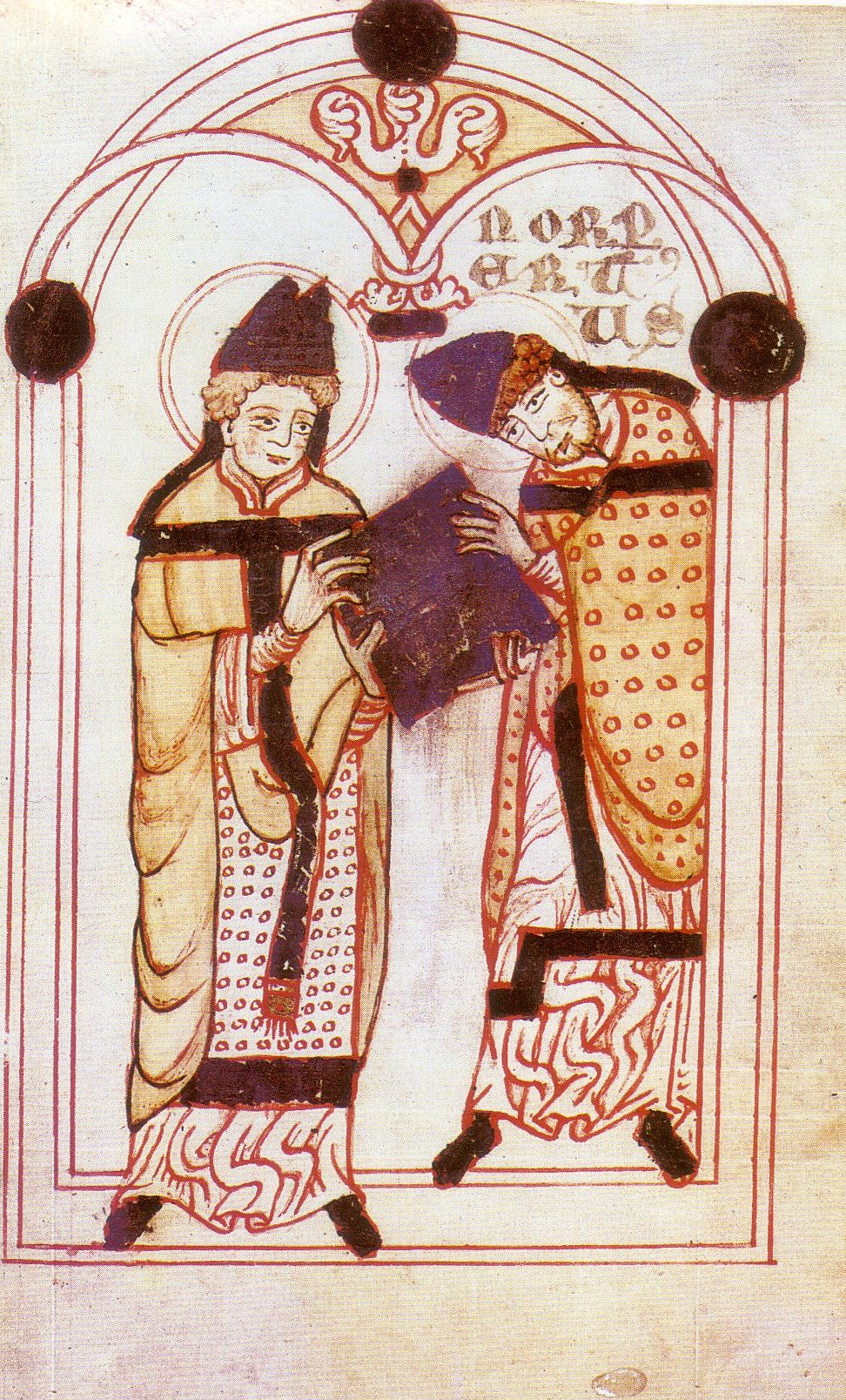
Norbert (on the right) receives the Augustinian Rule from Augustine of Hippo. From the "Vita Sancti Norberti", 12th-century manuscript.

At the Council of Reims in October 1119, Pope Calixtus II requested Norbert to found a religious order in the Diocese of Laon in France. On Christmas Day, 1120, Norbert established the Canons Regular of Prémontré.

For a Rule of life, Norbert chose the Rule of St. Augustine as was common among communities of priests—"canons". In addition he adapted some of the customs of the Cistercians. Even more of these would be brought in later by Norbert's successor, Abbot Hugh of Fosse. In effect he produced a community that would be somewhat monastic as far as house ministry. The whole idea was that his active priests needed an ascetic and contemplative haven and that was the purpose of the abbey discipline.

Norbert chose a valley in the Forest of Coucy (a grant from Barthélemy de Jur, the Bishop of Laon), about 10 miles from Laon, named Prémontré. Hugh of Fosses, Evermode of Ratzeburg, Antony of Nivelles, seven students of the celebrated school of Anselm, and Ralph of Laon were among his first thirteen disciples. By the next year the community had grown to 40. They all took their vows and the Order of Canons Regular of Prémontré was founded. The young community at first lived in huts of wood and clay, arranged like a camp around the chapel of Saint John the Baptist, but they soon built a larger church and a monastery for the religious who joined them in increasing numbers. Going to Cologne to obtain relics for their church, Norbert is said to have discovered, through a dream, the spot where those of Ursula and her companions, of Gereon, and of other martyrs lay hidden. In 1125/6, the constitution for the order was approved by Pope Honorius II.

Norbert gained adherents in Germany, France, Belgium and Hungary, and houses of his order were founded in Floreffe, Viviers, St-Josse, Ardenne, Cuissy, Laon, Liège, Antwerp, Varlar, Kappenberg, Nagyvárad (Oradea/Großwardein) and elsewhere. Count Theobald II of Champagne wanted to enter the new order, but Norbert counseled him to remain a layman and marry. Norbert prescribed a few rules and invested Theobald with the white scapular of the order, and thus, in 1122, the Third Order of St. Norbert was instituted. He continued to preach throughout France, Belgium and Germany and was successful in combatting a eucharistic heresy in Antwerp proposed by one Tanchelm. In commemoration of this, Norbert has been proclaimed the "Apostle of Antwerp".

== Archbishop of Magdeburg ==
In 1126 Pope Honorius II appointed Norbert to the Archbishopric of Magdeburg, where he put into practice the precepts he instituted at Prémontré. Several assassination attempts were made as he began to reform the lax discipline of his see. He was instrumental in protecting the Church's rights against the secular power during the Investiture Controversy.

In the schism following the election of Pope Innocent II in 1130, Norbert supported Innocent and resisted Antipope Anacletus II. In Norbert's last years, he was chancellor and adviser to Lothair II, the Holy Roman Emperor, persuading him to lead an army in 1133 to Rome to restore Innocent to the papacy.

== Veneration ==
When Norbert died in Magdeburg on 6 June 1134, both the canons at the cathedral and the canons at St. Mary's Abbey claimed the body. The two parties resorted to Lothair III who decreed the body should be buried in the Norbertine Abbey. In 1524, Martin Luther preached in the city and, as a result, Magdeburg became a Protestant city. Numerous attempts were made over the centuries by the Abbey of Strahov in Prague to retrieve Norbert's body. Only after several military defeats at the hand of Emperor Ferdinand II was the abbot of Strahov able to claim the body. On 2 May 1627 the body was finally brought to Prague where it remains to this day, displayed as an auto-icon in a glass-fronted tomb.

Norbert was canonized by Pope Gregory XIII in the year 1582, and his statue appears above the Piazza colonnade of St. Peter's Basilica in Rome.

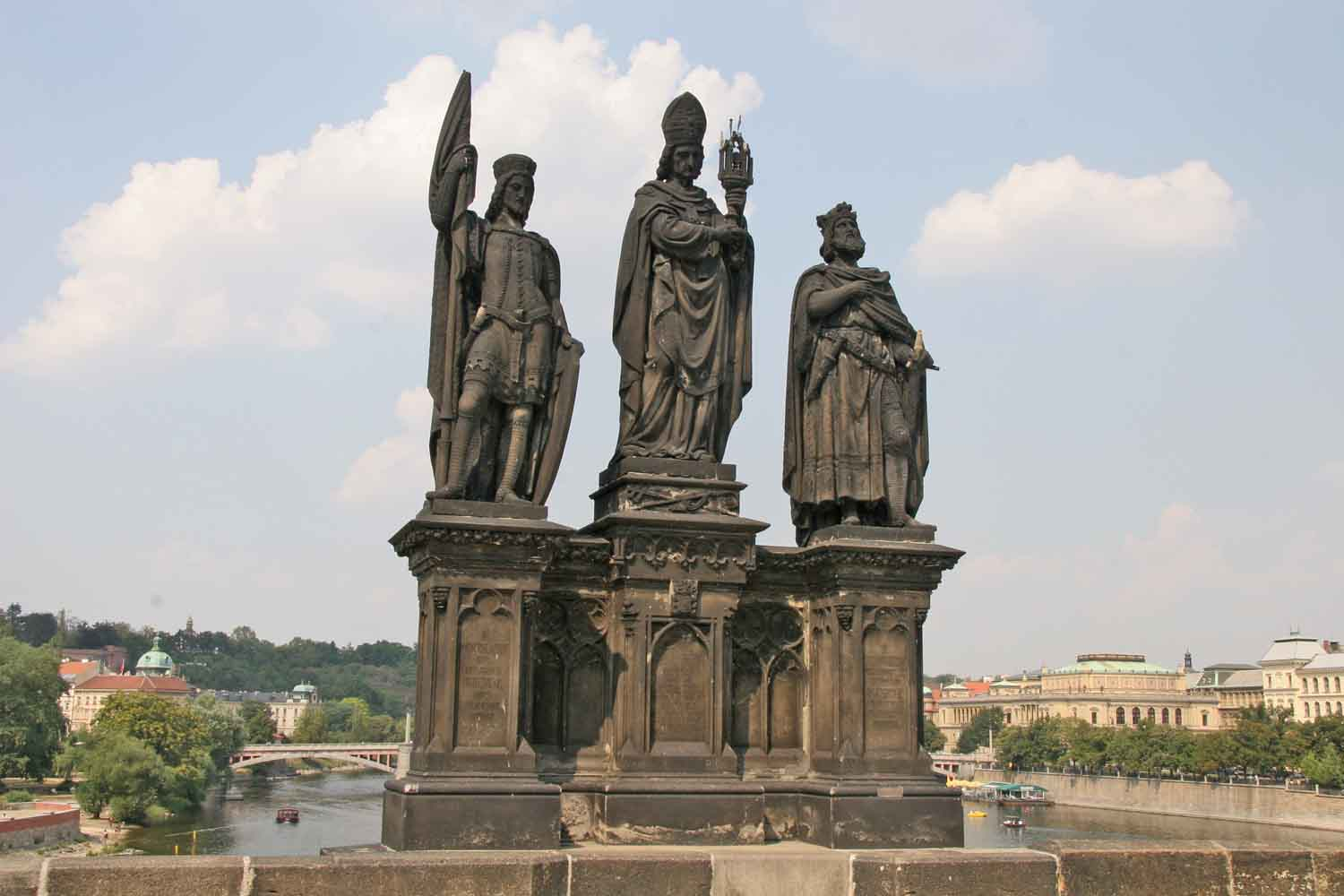
Statues of Saints Norbert, Wenceslaus and Sigismund on the Charles Bridge in Prague. The statue of Saint Norbert is in the middle); on the left is Saint Wenceslas, while on the right is Saint Sigismund.

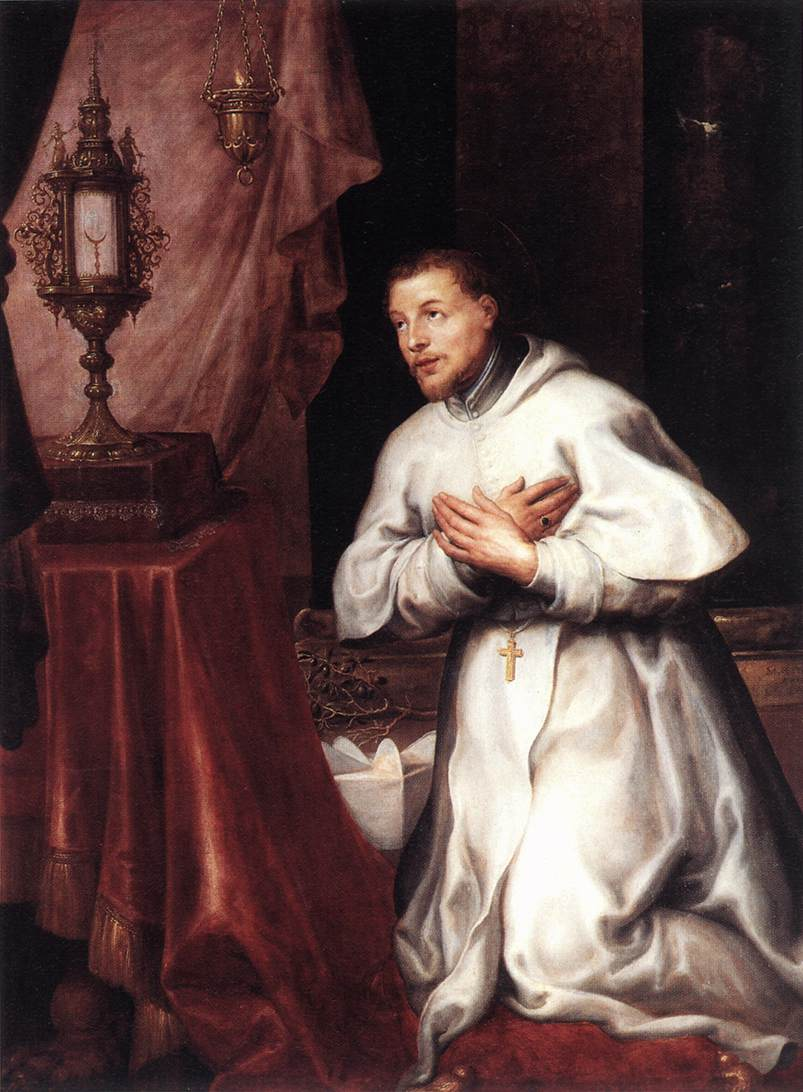
Saint Norbert by Marten Pepijn

== Legacy ==
Premonstratensian (or Norbertine) Canons in Europe, the US, Canada, the United Kingdom, South America, Zaire, South Africa, India and Australia are involved in education, parochial ministry, university chaplaincy, and also youth work. St. Norbert College in De Pere, Wisconsin houses the Center for Norbertine Studies.

== See also ==
- Saint Norbert of Xanten, patron saint archive
