= Jean-Baptiste Forceville =

Organ builder (1655–1739)

Jean-Baptiste Forceville (Saint-Omer, 1655 – Brussels, 1739) is one of the striking organ builders from the early 18th century. He is sometimes called the "father of the Flemish Rococo organ". His style broke with the traditional structures of the organ and he formed a school that dominated the entire 18th century in the Low Countries.

Forceville studied with his fellow townsman the organ maker Francois van Isacker (1633-1682). He later settled in Antwerp after practicing his profession as a traveling organ builder. From then on his activities were limited to a few places of worship in Antwerp and surroundings. He also became a member of the Guild of Saint Luke, the association of Antwerp traders and antique dealers, and married there. Around 1705, Forceville moved to Brussels where he was appointed organ master at the Court and was charged with the construction of a monumental organ in the Cathedral of St. Michael and St. Gudula. Other work of him included the organ in the church of Ninove Abbey. His son Thomas was also an organ builder.
