= Johan Evenepoel =

Belgian composer

Johan Evenepoel (born 25 January 1965) is a Belgian composer.

Evenepoel was born in Ninove on 25 January 1965. He was educated at the Lemmensinstituut in Leuven, where he won several first prizes. After graduation he worked for a while for the Belgian Army Orchestra of the Grenadiers. He has taught clarinet at several musical academies in Halle, Lennik and Brakel. Evenepoel has composed around eighty works, most of them for wind orchestras like brass band, fanfare and wind band.
