= Euan Kirkwood =

Scottish cricketer

Personal information
- Full name: Euan MacMillan Kirkwood
- Born: 7 December 1934 (age 91); Paisley, Renfrewshire, Scotland
- Batting: Right-handed
- Role: Wicket-keeper

Domestic team information
- Years: Team
- 1958: Scotland

Career statistics
Competition	First-class
Matches	3
Runs scored	17
Batting average	3.40
100s/50s	–/–
Top score	10
Catches/stumpings	5/–
- Source: Cricinfo, 20 October 2022

Euan MacMillan Kirkwood (born 7 December 1934) is a Scottish former first-class cricketer.

Kirkwood was born in Paisley in December 1934 and was educated at Merchiston Castle School. A club cricketer for Ferguslie, Kirkwood made three appearances in first-class cricket for Scotland in 1958, against Yorkshire at Middlesbrough, the touring New Zealanders at Glasgow, and Ireland at Ayr. He struggled with the bat in these three matches, scoring 17 runs at an average of 3.40. He later emigrated to Canada, where he settled in British Columbia. He continued to play cricket in Canada as a wicketkeeper, representing British Columbia.
