= James Kirkwood (grammarian) =

Scottish teacher and grammarian

James Kirkwood (fl. 1698) was a Scottish teacher and grammarian.

== Life ==
Kirkwood was born near Dunbar. In May 1674 he was acting as tutor ("governour") to Lord Bruce at Glasgow College, where he lodged for some time with Gilbert Burnet. In the same year he was offered by Sir Robert Milne of Barntoun, provost of Linlithgow, the mastership of the school there, and eventually accepted in 1675. After 15 years, he quarrelled with the magistrates, was dismissed, and litigation ensued. Kirkwood got the better of his employers, who were mulcted in damages to the extent of four thousand merks for forcibly ejecting him and his wife — a Dutch lady, Goletine van Beest — from their house, and throwing his books and papers and Mrs. Kirkwood's furniture into the street.

Kirkwood left Linlithgow and went, in March 1690, to Edinburgh, where he lived for a year without employment. He then started a school for gentlemen's sons. He states that he later refused the professorship of humanity in the University of St Andrews, a call to Duns, another call to be professor of Greek and Latin at Jamestown, Virginia, the mastership of the free school at Kimbolton, and of a free school in Ireland. He also states that he was invited to return to Linlithgow school.

Subsequently Kirkwood became, on the invitation of the Countess of Roxburgh, master of the school at Kelso. Here he was again involved in serious difficulties.

Kirkwood died before 1720, probably at Kelso.

== Grammatical works ==
In John Penney's History of Linlithgowshire and George Chalmers's Life of Ruddiman, Kirkwood is spoken of as the leading grammarian of his day. At the suggestion of Lord Stair, president of the court of session, he was consulted by the commissioners for colleges and schools as to the best Latin grammar to be used in Scotland. He pointed out the defects of Despauter, and was requested to edit Despauter's grammar. In 1695 he produced Grammatica Despauteriana, cum nova novi generis Glossa: cui subjunguntur singula primæ Partis Exempla Vernacule Reddita. It was dedicated to the commissioners of schools and colleges, and secured the privy council's privilege for 19 years. A second edition appeared in 1700, a third in 1711, and a fourth in 1720, all published in Edinburgh. The book was superseded by Thomas Ruddiman's Rudiments (1714).

Kirkwood also wrote:

- Grammatica facilis, seu nova et artificiosa methodus docendi Linguam Latinam: cui præfiguntur animadversiones in rudimenta nostra vulgaria, et Grammaticam Despauterianam ..., Glasgow, 1674.
- Prima pars Grammaticæ in metrum redacta, Edinburgh, 1675.
- Secunda pars Grammaticæ ..., Edinburgh, 1676.
- ‘Tertia et quarta pars Grammaticæ,’ Edinburgh, 1676.
- All the Examples, both Words and Sentences, of the First part of grammar, translated into English by J. K., Edinburgh, 1676.
- Grammatica delineata secundum sententiam plurium ..., London, 1677.
- Rhetoricæ Compendium; cui subjicitur de Analysi Tractatiuncula, Edinburgh, 1678.

== Controversy ==
Kirkwood published an account of the Linlithgow litigation in A Short Information of the Plea betwixt the Town Council of Lithgow and Mr. James Kirkwood, Schoolmaster there, whereof a more full account may perhaps come out hereafter (1690). Among other charges brought against Kirkwood was that he was "a reviler of the gods of the people". "By gods", says Kirkwood, "they mean the twenty-seven members of the town council". Many years later he published The History of the Twenty Seven Gods of Linlithgow; Being an exact and true Account of a Famous Plea betwixt the Town-Council of the said Burgh, and Mr. Kirkwood, Schoolmaster there. Seria Mixta Jocis, Edinburgh, 1711. It was dedicated to Sir David Dalrymple, whose elder brother, the "Earl of Stair", says the author, "not only sent his son, the present earl, to my school at Lithgow, but tabled him in my house". The work contains details of the social and religious state of affairs during the contention for supremacy between the Presbyterian and Prelatic parties.

Kirkwood narrated his affairs at Kelso in Mr. Kirkwood's Plea before the Kirk, and Civil Judicatures of Scotland. Divided into Five Parts, London, printed by D. E. for the author, 1698, dedicated to the Countess of Roxburgh. Kirkwood made a crude attack on the character of the minister, Dr. Jaques, who replied in a Vindication against Master Kirkwood's Defamation. Kirkwood sent forth an Answer, without an imprint. Throughout his pamphleteering Kirkwood claimed high repute as a grammarian.

== Notes ==
Attribution

This article incorporates text from a publication now in the public domain: Stronach, George (1892). "Kirkwood, James (fl.1698)". In Lee, Sidney (ed.). Dictionary of National Biography. Vol. 31. London: Smith, Elder & Co.
