= Ken Kirkwood =

Canadian bioethicist

Kenneth William Kirkwood (born April 27, 1969 in Kingston, Ontario, Canada) is a Canadian bioethicist. He is Professor of Applied Health Ethics at the University of Western Ontario in London, Ontario. He specializes in questions of professional ethical standards, enhancement of human physiological and neurological traits, and sociological-philosophical questions of health research.

He is a teacher of some renown, having been declared amongst the top 30 lecturers in Ontario universities by public broadcaster TVOntario in 2007.

His most notable contribution to public debate have been on bioethical questions of doping in sport, specifically in the Olympics and the Tour de France.
