= Prémontré =

- Commune
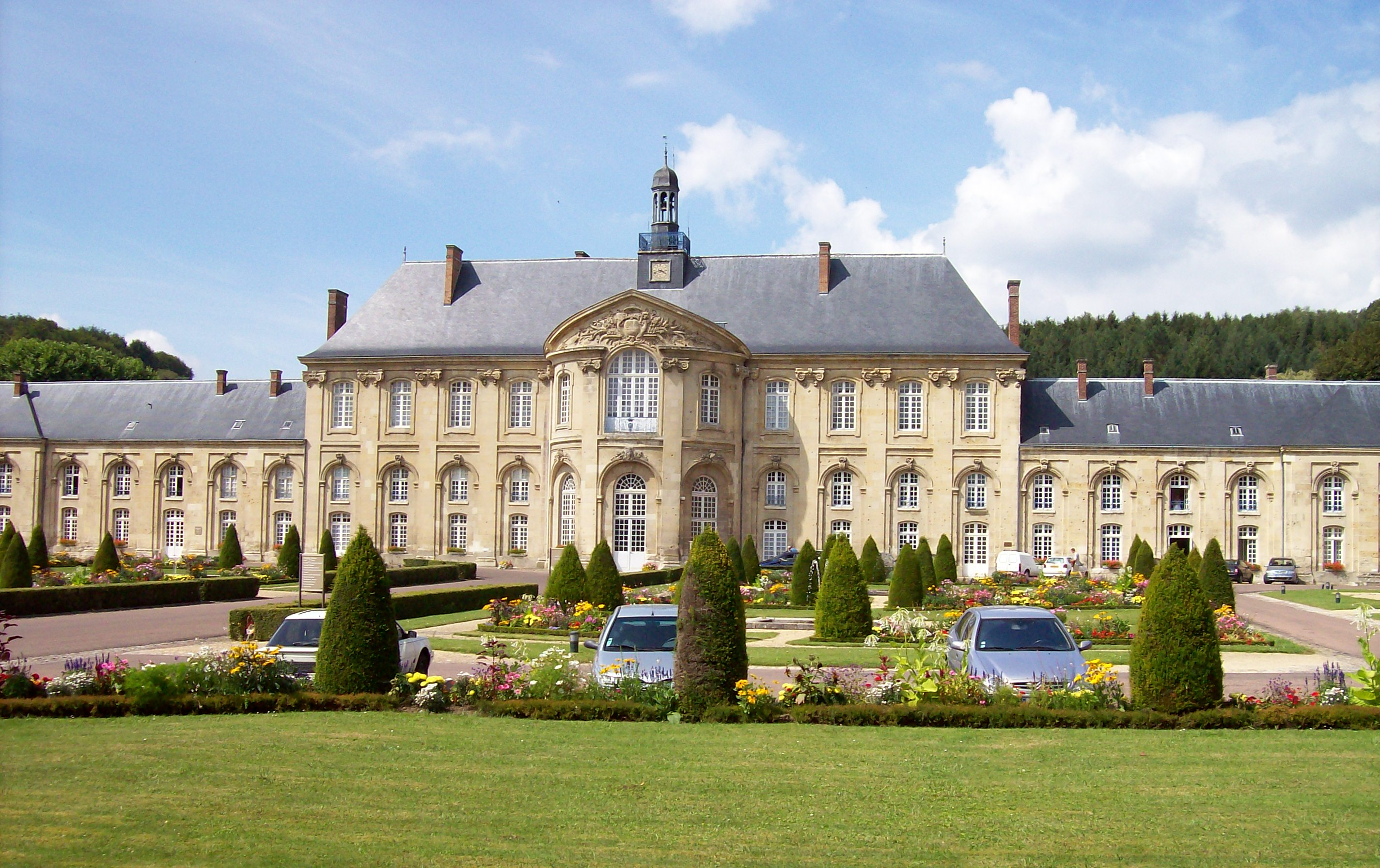
- Abbey palace
- Location of Prémontré
- Location within France Location within Hauts-de-France
- Coordinates: 49°32′28″N 3°24′53″E
- Country: France
- Region: Hauts-de-France
- Department: Aisne
- Arrondissement: Laon
- Canton: Laon-1

Government
  - Mayor (2026–32): Thomas Dominguez
- Area^{1}: 8.33 km^{2} (3.22 sq mi)
- Elevation: 110 m (360 ft)
- Highest elevation: 215 m (705 ft)
- Lowest elevation: 84 m (276 ft)
- Population (2023): 594
  - Density: 71.3/km^{2} (185/sq mi)
- Time zone: UTC+01:00 (CET)
  - Summer (DST): UTC+02:00 (CEST)
- INSEE/Postal code: 02619 /02320
- ^{1} French Land Register data, which excludes lakes, ponds, glaciers > 1 km^{2} (0.386 sq mi or 247 acres) and river estuaries.

Prémontré (French pronunciation: [pʁemɔ̃tʁe]) is a commune in the Aisne department in Hauts-de-France in northern France. The remains of Prémontré Abbey, the mother house of the Premonstratensian Order, are located in Prémontré.

== Etymology ==
The name of the locality is attested in the forms Premonstratum (1120), Pratum-Monstratum (1140), Prémonstré (1219), Prémoustré (1274), Premonstret (1292), and Presmoustré (1588).

Pratum monstratum ("pre-discovered, uncovered"), or Prémonstré was a site offered in the twelfth century to Norbert of Xanten to found his community. According to legends as well as Ernest Nègre, the toponym comes from the adjective prémontré in langue d'oïl "(place) shown in advance". (Saint Norbert said that the location of the abbey had been designated to him by God, and this name was to serve as the name of the new religious order he founded there).

== Population ==
Historical population
Year	Pop.	±% p.a.
1968	2,024	—
1975	2,039	+0.11%
1982	1,490	−4.38%
1990	1,070	−4.05%
1999	775	−3.52%
2007	767	−0.13%
2012	773	+0.16%
2017	661	−3.08%
2023	594	−1.77%
Source: INSEE

== See also ==
- Communes of the Aisne department
