= Bonne-Espérance Abbey =

Premonstratensian abbey in France

Coordinates: 50.38611°N 4.13972°E

Bonne-Espérance Abbey (French: Abbaye de Bonne-Espérance, pronounced [abei də bɔn ɛspeʁɑ̃s]) was a Premonstratensian abbey that existed from 1130 to the end of the 18th century, located in Vellereille-les-Brayeux in the Walloon municipality of Estinnes, province of Hainaut, Diocese of Tournai, in present-day Belgium.

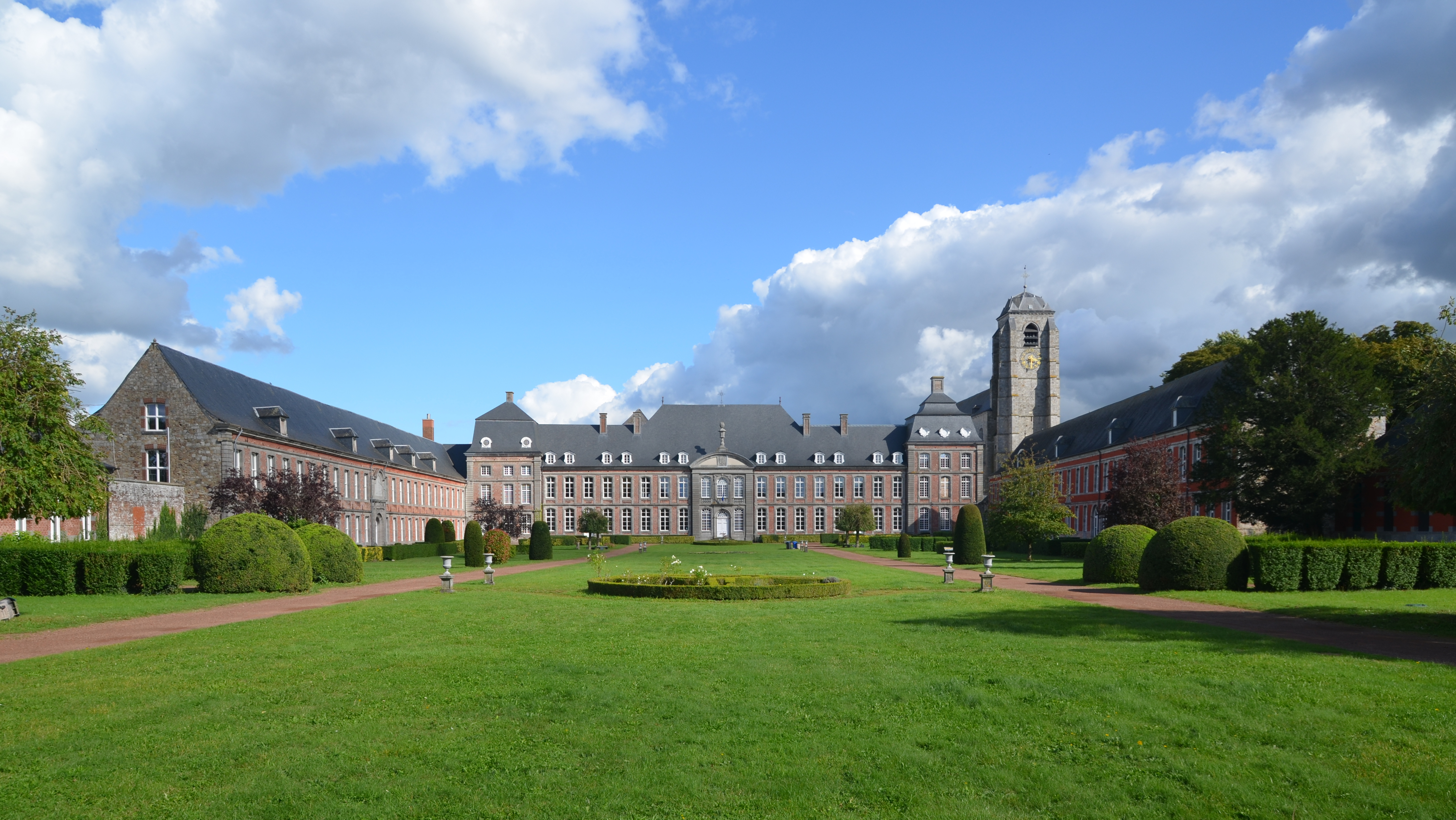
Bonne-Espérance Abbey, contemporary view

== History ==
The abbey owed its foundation to the conversion of William, the only son and heir of Rainard, the Knight of Croix. William had followed the heretical teaching of Tanchelm, but Norbert of Xanten brought him back to Roman Catholicism. In gratitude his parents, Rainard and Beatrix, gave land to Norbert for the foundation of an abbey at Ramegnies, while William followed Norbert to Prémontré. Ramegnies having been found unsuitable, Odo, the first abbot, led his young colony to another locality in the neighbourhood.

"Bonne-Espérance" is French for "good hope". A legend says that when Odo saw the place that became the site of the new abbey, he exclaimed: "Bonæ spei fecisti filios tuos" ("O God, Thou hast made Thy children to be of good hope"). Another explanation of the name is it refers to the veneration here of the statue of Our Lady of Good Hope.

The abbey grew and Odo was succeeded by Philip of Harvengt, a significant theological writer.fr, whose defence of her virginity has been described by Abbot Philip, was a Premonstratensian nun in a subordinate house at Rivreulle under the direction of the abbot of Bonne-Espérance.

== Suppression ==
In the time of the forty-sixth and last abbot of Bonne-Espérance, Bonaventure Daublain, the abbey was twice occupied and pillaged by the French Revolutionary Army, in 1792 and again in 1794, when the community was dispersed. At the time of its suppression the abbey counted sixty-seven members. Although they wished to live in community, they were not allowed to do so during the French Republic, nor after 1815 under King William I of the Netherlands. The last surviving religious gave the abbey to the Bishop of Tournai for a diocesan seminary.

== Church ==
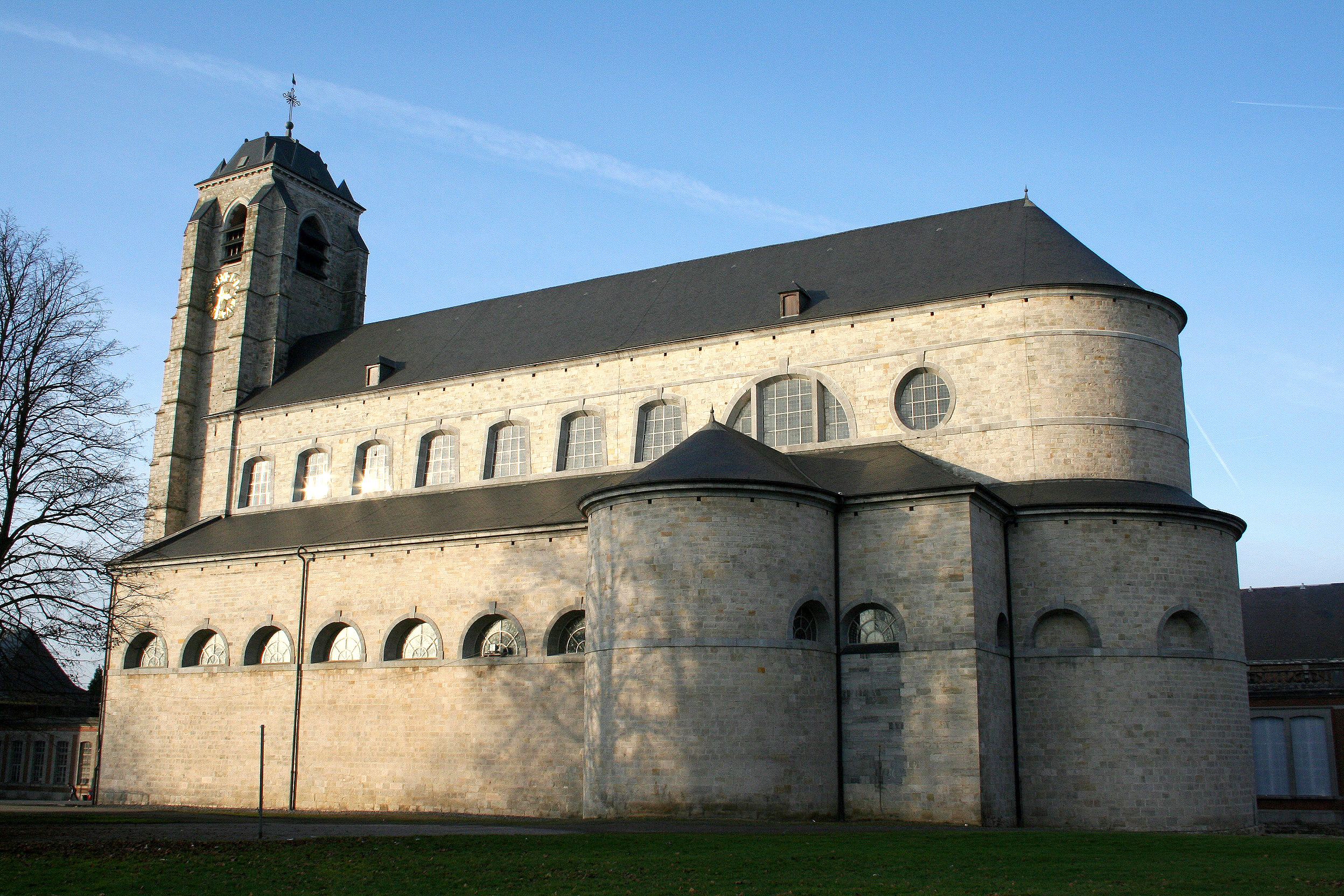
Former abbey church

The church is still Norbertine in its appearance. In 1616 or 1617 the remains of Saint Frederick of Hallum were brought here from the Premonstratensian Mariengaarde Abbey in the Netherlands to save them from the Calvinists. The relics were concealed in Vellereille during the French Revolution. In 1938 they were moved to Leffe Abbey near Dinant.

The church still (as at 1911) contains the statues of Saint Norbert, of Saint Frederick, and of two Premonstratensian bishops of Ratzeburg, Saints Evermod and Isfried. At the time of the suppression the statue of Our Lady of Good Hope was hidden; and when peace was restored, it was brought to the church of Vellereille of which one of the canons of Bonne-Espérance was the parish priest. In 1833 it was solemnly brought back to the abbey church, or, as it is now, the seminary church.
