= February 17 =

February 17 this year in various calendars
- Tuesday, 17 February 2026
Akan	Nwonabene
Armenian	2 Areg 1475
Aztec	Etzalcualiztli 18, 13 Miquiztli
Babylonian	28 Tebetu, 2336 SE
Balinese pawukon	Luang, Pepet, Beteng, Laba, Keliwon, Aryang, Anggara of Parangbakat, Indra, Tulus, Pati
Bengali	4 Falgun, BS 1432
Chinese	Yang Water Dog・Encampment Mansion; Fire Horse Year, Month 1, Day 1 (Lichun, 1 day until Yushui)
Common Era	17 February 2026 CE
Coptic	10 Meshir, AM 1742
Egyptian	7 Epiphi, 2774 NE
Ethiopian	10 Yakātit, 2018 Amätä Məhrät
French Republican	Décade III, Nonidi de Pluviôse de l'Année 234 de la République
Gregorian	17 February, AD 2026
Hebrew	30 Shevat, AM 5786
Hindu	Dhaniṣṭhā・Varīyas; Solar: 5 Phālguna, 1947 SE; Lunisolar: Amāvasyā, Kṛishna pakṣa of Māgha, 2082 VE; Siddhārthin・5126 KY・1,872,623
Icelandic	Þriðjudagur, 26 Þorri 2025
Islamic	29 Sha'aban, AH 1447 (using tabular method)
ISO week date	2026-W08-2
Japanese	1 Mutsuki, Reiwa 8 (Risshun, 2 days until Usui)
Julian	4 February, AD 2026 (AM 7534)
Julian day	2461089
Korean	1 Horangidal, 4359 DE
Maya	13.0.13.6.6; 4 Kayab, 13 Cimi
Roman	Pridie Nonas Februarias, MMDCCLXXIX AUC
Solar Hijri	28 Bahman, SH 1404
Tibetan	30 rgyal, shing mo sbrul 2152 or 1771 or 999

<<	February					>>
Su	Mo	Tu	We	Th	Fr	Sa
1	2	3	4	5	6	7
8	9	10	11	12	13	14
15	16	17	18	19	20	21
22	23	24	25	26	27	28
2026

February 17 in recent years
2026 (Tuesday)
2025 (Monday)
2024 (Saturday)
2023 (Friday)
2022 (Thursday)
2021 (Wednesday)
2020 (Monday)
2019 (Sunday)
2018 (Saturday)
2017 (Friday)

February 17 is the 48th day of the year in the Gregorian calendar; 317 days remain until the end of the year (318 in leap years).

== Events ==
=== Pre-1600 ===
- 1370 – Northern Crusades: Grand Duchy of Lithuania and the Teutonic Knights meet in the Battle of Rudau.
- 1411 – Following the successful campaigns during the Ottoman Interregnum, Musa Çelebi, one of the sons of Bayezid I, becomes Sultan of the Ottoman Empire with the support of Mircea I of Wallachia.
- 1461 – The Lancastrian army inflicts a defeat on the Yorkist army in the second battle of St Albans during the Wars of the Roses, allowing them to release king Henry VI from captivity.
- 1500 – Duke Frederick of Schleswig-Holstein and King John of Denmark attempt to subdue the peasantry of Dithmarschen, Denmark, in the Battle of Hemmingstedt.
- 1600 – On his way to be burned at the stake for heresy, at Campo de' Fiori in Rome, the philosopher Giordano Bruno has a wooden vise put on his tongue to prevent him continuing to speak.

=== 1601–1900 ===
- 1616 – Nurhaci proclaims himself Khan of the Later Jin, precursor to the Qing Dynasty.
- 1621 – Myles Standish is appointed as first military commander of the English Plymouth Colony in North America.
- 1674 – An earthquake strikes the Indonesian island of Ambon. It triggers a 100 m (330 ft) megatsunami which drowns over 2,300 people.
- 1676 – Sixteen men of Pascual de Iriate's expedition are lost at Evangelistas Islets at the western end of the Strait of Magellan.
- 1739 – The Battle of Vasai commences as the Marathas move to invade Portuguese-occupied territory.
- 1753 – In Sweden, February 17 is followed by March 1 as the country moves from the Julian calendar to the Gregorian calendar.
- 1801 – United States presidential election: A tie in the Electoral College between Thomas Jefferson and Aaron Burr is resolved when Jefferson is elected President of the United States and Burr Vice President by the United States House of Representatives.
- 1814 – War of the Sixth Coalition: The Battle of Mormant.
- 1819 – The United States House of Representatives passes the Missouri Compromise for the first time.
- 1838 – In the Weenen massacre, hundreds of Voortrekkers along the Blaukraans River, Natal are killed by Zulus.
- 1854 – The United Kingdom recognizes the independence of the Orange Free State.
- 1859 – Cochinchina Campaign: The French Navy captures the Citadel of Saigon, a fortress manned by 1,000 Nguyễn dynasty soldiers, en route to conquering Saigon and other regions of southern Viet Nam.
- 1863 – A group of citizens of Geneva found an International Committee for Relief to the Wounded, which later became known as the International Committee of the Red Cross.
- 1864 – American Civil War: The H. L. Hunley becomes the first submarine to engage and sink a warship, the USS Housatonic.
- 1865 – American Civil War: Columbia, South Carolina, is burned as Confederate forces flee from advancing Union forces.

=== 1901–present ===
- 1905 – Russian Revolution of 1905: Grand Duke Sergei Alexandrovich of Russia is assassinated in the Moscow Kremlin by Socialist Revolutionary Ivan Kalyayev.
- 1913 – The Armory Show opens in New York City, displaying works of artists who subsequently become some of the most influential painters of the early 20th century.
- 1919 – The Ukrainian People's Republic asks the Entente and the United States for help fighting the Bolsheviks.
- 1944 – World War II: The Battle of Eniwetok begins. The battle ends in an American victory on February 22.
- 1944 – World War II: Operation Hailstone begins: U.S. naval air, surface and submarine attack against Truk Lagoon, Japan's main base in the central Pacific, in support of the Eniwetok invasion.
- 1948 – The Al-Waziri coup briefly ousts the ruling Hamidaddin dynasty of Yemen; Imam Yahya Muhammad Hamid ed-Din is killed.
- 1949 – Chaim Weizmann begins his term as the first President of Israel.
- 1959 – Project Vanguard: Vanguard 2: The first weather satellite is launched to measure cloud-cover distribution.
- 1959 – A Turkish Airlines Vickers Viscount crashes near Gatwick Airport, killing 14; Turkish prime minister Adnan Menderes survives the crash.
- 1964 – In Wesberry v. Sanders the Supreme Court of the United States rules that congressional districts have to be approximately equal in population.
- 1964 – Gabonese president Léon M'ba is toppled by a coup and his rival, Jean-Hilaire Aubame, is installed in his place.
- 1965 – Project Ranger: The Ranger 8 probe launches on its mission to photograph the Mare Tranquillitatis region of the Moon in preparation for the crewed Apollo missions. Mare Tranquillitatis or the "Sea of Tranquility" would become the site chosen for the Apollo 11 lunar landing.
- 1966 – Aeroflot Flight 065 crashes during take-off from Sheremetyevo International Airport, killing 21.
- 1969 – American aquanaut Berry L. Cannon dies of carbon dioxide poisoning while attempting to repair a leak in the SEALAB III underwater habitat. The SEALAB project was subsequently abandoned.
- 1970 – The family of Jeffrey R. MacDonald, United States Army captain, is found murdered in their home in Fort Bragg, North Carolina, US. Eventually, MacDonald was charged with and convicted of the murder of his pregnant wife and two daughters.
- 1972 – Cumulative sales of the Volkswagen Beetle exceed those of the Ford Model T.
- 1974 – Robert K. Preston, a disgruntled U.S. Army private, buzzes the White House in a stolen helicopter.
- 1978 – The Troubles: The Provisional IRA detonates an incendiary bomb at the La Mon restaurant, near Belfast, killing 12 and seriously injuring 30 others, all Protestants.
- 1979 – The Sino-Vietnamese War begins.
- 1980 – First winter ascent of Mount Everest by Krzysztof Wielicki and Leszek Cichy.
- 1991 – Ryan International Airlines Flight 590 crashes during takeoff from Cleveland Hopkins International Airport, killing both pilots, the aircraft's only occupants.
- 1992 – First Nagorno-Karabakh War: Armenian troops massacre more than 20 Azerbaijani civilians during the Capture of Garadaghly.
- 1995 – The Cenepa War between Peru and Ecuador ends on a ceasefire brokered by the UN.
- 1996 – In Philadelphia, world champion Garry Kasparov beats the Deep Blue supercomputer in a chess match.
- 1996 – NASA's Discovery Program begins as the NEAR Shoemaker spacecraft lifts off on the first mission ever to orbit and land on an asteroid, 433 Eros.
- 1996 – The 8.2 M_{w} Biak earthquake shakes the Papua province of eastern Indonesia with a maximum Mercalli intensity of VIII (Severe). A large tsunami followed, leaving 166 people dead or missing and 423 injured.
- 2006 – A massive mudslide occurs in Southern Leyte, Philippines; the official death toll is set at 1,126.
- 2008 – Kosovo declares independence from Serbia.
- 2011 – Arab Spring: Libyan protests against Muammar Gaddafi's regime begin.
- 2011 – Arab Spring: In Bahrain, security forces launch a deadly pre-dawn raid on protesters in Pearl Roundabout in Manama; the day is locally known as Bloody Thursday.
- 2015 – Eighteen people are killed and 78 injured in a stampede at a Mardi Gras parade in Haiti.
- 2016 – Military vehicles explode outside a Turkish Armed Forces barracks in Ankara, Turkey, killing at least 29 people and injuring 61 others.

== Births ==
=== Pre-1600 ===
- 624 – Wu Zetian, Chinese empress consort (died 705)
- 1028 – Al-Juwayni, Persian scholar and imam (died 1085)
- 1490 – Charles III, duke of Bourbon (died 1527)
- 1519 – Francis, French Grand Chamberlain (died 1563)
- 1524 – Charles de Lorraine, French cardinal (died 1574)

=== 1601–1900 ===
- 1646 – Pierre Le Pesant, sieur de Boisguilbert, French economist (died 1714)
- 1653 – Arcangelo Corelli, Italian violinist and composer (died 1713)
- 1723 – Tobias Mayer, German astronomer and academic (died 1762)
- 1740 – Horace-Bénédict de Saussure, Swiss physicist and meteorologist (died 1799)
- 1752 – Friedrich Maximilian Klinger, German author and playwright (died 1831)
- 1754 – Nicolas Baudin, French cartographer and explorer (died 1803)
- 1758 – John Pinkerton, Scottish antiquarian, cartographer, author, numismatist and historian (died 1826)
- 1762 – John Cooke, English captain (died 1805)
- 1781 – René Laennec, French physician, invented the stethoscope (died 1826)
- 1796 – Philipp Franz von Siebold, German physician and botanist (died 1866)
- 1799 – Carl Julian (von) Graba, German lawyer and ornithologist who visited and studied the Faroe Islands (died 1874)
- 1817 – Édouard Thilges, Luxembourgish jurist and politician, 7th Prime Minister of Luxembourg (died 1904)
- 1820 – Henri Vieuxtemps, Belgian violinist and composer (died 1881)
- 1821 – Lola Montez, Irish-American actress and dancer (died 1861)
- 1832 – Richard Henry Park, American sculptor (died 1902)
- 1836 – Gustavo Adolfo Bécquer, Spanish author, poet, and playwright (died 1870)
- 1843 – Aaron Montgomery Ward, American businessman, founded Montgomery Ward (died 1913)
- 1848 – Louisa Lawson, Australian poet and publisher (died 1920)
- 1849 – Joseph Favre, Swiss chef (died 1903)
- 1854 – Friedrich Alfred Krupp, German businessman (died 1902)
- 1861 – Helena of Waldeck and Pyrmont, duchess of Albany (died 1922)
- 1862 – Mori Ōgai, Japanese general, author, and poet (died 1922)
- 1864 – Jozef Murgaš, Slovak priest, botanist, and painter (died 1929)
- 1864 – Banjo Paterson, Australian journalist, author, and poet (died 1941)
- 1874 – Thomas J. Watson, American businessman (died 1956)
- 1877 – Isabelle Eberhardt, Swiss explorer and author (died 1904)
- 1877 – André Maginot, French sergeant and politician (died 1932)
- 1879 – Dorothy Canfield Fisher, American educational reformer, social activist and author (died 1958)
- 1881 – Mary Carson Breckinridge, American nurse midwife, founded Frontier Nursing Service (died 1965)
- 1887 – Joseph Bech, Luxembourgish lawyer and politician, 15th Prime Minister of Luxembourg (died 1975)
- 1887 – Leevi Madetoja, Finnish composer and critic (died 1947)
- 1888 – Ronald Knox, English Catholic priest (died 1957)
- 1888 – Otto Stern, German-American physicist and academic, Nobel Prize laureate (died 1969)
- 1890 – Ronald Fisher, English-Australian statistician, biologist, and geneticist (died 1962)
- 1891 – Abraham Fraenkel, German-Israeli mathematician and academic (died 1965)
- 1893 – Wally Pipp, American baseball player and journalist (died 1965)
- 1899 – Jibanananda Das, Bangladeshi-Indian poet and author (died 1954)
- 1900 – Ruth Clifford, American actress (died 1998)

=== 1901–present ===
- 1903 – Sadegh Hedayat, Iranian-French author and translator (died 1951)
- 1903 – Joaquín Rodríguez Ortega, known as "Cagancho", Spanish bullfighter (died 1984)
- 1904 – Hans Morgenthau, German-American political scientist, philosopher, and academic (died 1980)
- 1905 – Rózsa Péter, Hungarian mathematician (died 1977)
- 1906 – Mary Brian, American actress (died 2002)
- 1908 – Bo Yibo, Chinese general and politician, Vice Premier of the People's Republic of China (died 2007)
- 1910 – Marc Lawrence, American actor, director, producer, and screenwriter (died 2005)
- 1911 – Oskar Seidlin, German-American author, poet, and scholar (died 1984)
- 1912 – Andre Norton, American author (died 2005)
- 1914 – Arthur Kennedy, American actor (died 1990)
- 1916 – Alexander Obolensky, Russian rugby player and pilot (died 1940)
- 1916 – Don Tallon, Australian cricketer (died 1984)
- 1916 – Raf Vallone, Italian footballer and actor (died 2002)
- 1918 – William Bronk, American poet and academic (died 1999)
- 1918 – Jacqueline Ferrand, French mathematician (died 2014)
- 1919 – J. M. S. Careless, Canadian historian and academic (died 2009)
- 1919 – Kathleen Freeman, American actress and singer (died 2001)
- 1919 – Joe Hunt, American tennis player (died 1945)
- 1920 – Ivo Caprino, Norwegian director and screenwriter (died 2001)
- 1920 – Annie Glenn, American disability and communication disorder advocate (died 2020)
- 1920 – Curt Swan, American illustrator (died 1996)
- 1921 – Duane Gish, American biochemist and academic (died 2013)
- 1922 – Tommy Edwards, American R&B singer-songwriter (died 1969)
- 1923 – Buddy DeFranco, American clarinet player and bandleader (died 2014)
- 1924 – Margaret Truman, American singer and author (died 2008)
- 1925 – Ron Goodwin, English composer and conductor (died 2003)
- 1925 – Hal Holbrook, American actor and director (died 2021)
- 1928 – Marta Romero, Puerto Rican actress and singer (died 2013)
- 1928 – Michiaki Takahashi, Japanese virologist (died 2013)
- 1929 – Alejandro Jodorowsky, Chilean-French director and screenwriter
- 1929 – Chaim Potok, American rabbi and author (died 2002)
- 1929 – Nicholas Ridley, Baron Ridley of Liddesdale, English lieutenant and politician, Secretary of State for Business, Innovation and Skills (died 1993)
- 1929 – Patricia Routledge, English actress and singer (died 2025)
- 1930 – Roger Craig, American baseball player, coach, and manager (died 2023)
- 1930 – Benjamin Fain, Ukrainian-Israeli physicist and academic (died 2013)
- 1930 – Ruth Rendell, English author (died 2015)
- 1931 – Jiřina Jirásková, Czech actress and singer (died 2013)
- 1931 – Buddy Ryan, American football coach (died 2016)
- 1933 – Craig L. Thomas, American captain and politician (died 2007)
- 1934 – Alan Bates, English actor (died 2003)
- 1934 – Barry Humphries, Australian comedian, actor, and author (died 2023)
- 1935 – Christina Pickles, English-American actress
- 1936 – Jim Brown, American football player and actor (died 2023)
- 1937 – Mary Ann Mobley, American model and actress, Miss America 1959 (died 2014)
- 1940 – Vicente Fernández, Mexican singer-songwriter, actor, and producer (died 2021)
- 1940 – Gene Pitney, American singer-songwriter (died 2006)
- 1941 – Julia McKenzie, English actress, singer, and director
- 1942 – Huey P. Newton, American activist, co-founded the Black Panther Party (died 1989)
- 1944 – Karl Jenkins, Welsh saxophonist, keyboard player, and composer
- 1945 – Zina Bethune, American actress, dancer, and choreographer (died 2012)
- 1945 – Brenda Fricker, Irish actress (died 2026)
- 1946 – Shahrnush Parsipur, Iranian-American author and academic
- 1948 – José José, Mexican singer-songwriter, producer, and actor (died 2019)
- 1949 – Fred Frith, English guitarist and songwriter
- 1949 – Dennis Green, American football player and coach (died 2016)
- 1951 – Rashid Minhas, Pakistani soldier and pilot (died 1971)
- 1952 – Karin Büttner-Janz, German gymnast and physician
- 1952 – Vladimír Padrůněk, Czech musician (died 1991)
- 1953 – Becky Ann Baker, American actress
- 1954 – Lou Ann Barton, American singer-songwriter
- 1954 – Miki Berkovich, Israeli basketball player
- 1954 – Rene Russo, American actress
- 1955 – Mo Yan, Chinese author and academic, Nobel Prize laureate
- 1956 – Richard Karn, American actor and game show host
- 1957 – Loreena McKennitt, Canadian singer-songwriter, accordion player, and pianist
- 1959 – Aryeh Deri, Moroccan-Israeli rabbi and politician, Israeli Minister of Internal Affairs
- 1959 – Rowdy Gaines, American swimmer and sportscaster
- 1960 – Lindy Ruff, Canadian hockey player and coach
- 1961 – Angela Eagle, English politician, Shadow Leader of the House of Commons
- 1961 – Maria Eagle, English politician, Shadow Secretary of State for Defence
- 1961 – Andrey Korotayev, Russian anthropologist, historian, and sociologist
- 1962 – Lou Diamond Phillips, American actor and director
- 1963 – Larry the Cable Guy, American comedian and voice actor
- 1963 – Alison Hargreaves, English mountaineer (died 1995)
- 1963 – Jen-Hsun Huang, Taiwanese-American businessman, co-founded Nvidia
- 1963 – Michael Jordan, American basketball player, executive, and businessman
- 1964 – Sherry Hawco, Canadian gymnast (died 1991)
- 1965 – Michael Bay, American director and producer
- 1965 – Danny Lee, Australian rugby league player
- 1966 – Luc Robitaille, Canadian ice hockey player, manager, and actor
- 1968 – Giuseppe Signori, Italian footballer
- 1968 – Wu'erkaixi, Chinese journalist and activist
- 1969 – David Douillet, French martial artist and politician
- 1969 – Vasily Kudinov, Russian handball player (died 2017)
- 1970 – Dominic Purcell, English-Australian actor and producer
- 1971 – Denise Richards, American model and actress
- 1972 – Billie Joe Armstrong, American singer-songwriter, guitarist, actor, and producer
- 1972 – Philippe Candeloro, French figure skater
- 1972 – Taylor Hawkins, American singer-songwriter and musician (died 2022)
- 1972 – Valeria Mazza, Argentine model and businesswoman
- 1973 – Drew Barry, American basketball player
- 1973 – Goran Bunjevčević, Serbian footballer (died 2018)
- 1973 – Raphaël Ibañez, French rugby player
- 1974 – Kaoru, Japanese guitarist, songwriter, and producer
- 1974 – Jerry O'Connell, American actor, director, and producer
- 1975 – Kaspars Astašenko, Latvian ice hockey player (died 2012)
- 1975 – Václav Prospal, Czech ice hockey player
- 1976 – Kelly Carlson, American actress and model
- 1978 – Rory Kinnear, English actor and playwright
- 1979 – Conrad Ricamora, American actor
- 1979 – Josh Willingham, American baseball player
- 1980 – Al Harrington, American basketball player
- 1980 – Jason Ritter, American actor
- 1980 – Klemi Saban, Israeli footballer
- 1981 – Joseph Gordon-Levitt, American actor, director, and producer
- 1981 – Paris Hilton, American model, media personality, actress, singer, DJ, author and businesswoman
- 1981 – Pontus Segerström, Swedish footballer (died 2014)
- 1982 – Adriano, Brazilian footballer
- 1982 – Brian Bruney, American baseball player
- 1984 – AB de Villiers, South African cricketer
- 1984 – Marcin Gortat, Polish basketball player
- 1984 – Katie Hill, Australian 3.0 point wheelchair basketball player
- 1985 – Anders Jacobsen, Norwegian ski jumper
- 1986 – Brett Kern, American football player
- 1987 – Ísis Valverde, Brazilian actress
- 1988 – Michael Frolík, Czech ice hockey player
- 1988 – Case Keenum, American football player
- 1988 – Vasyl Lomachenko, Ukrainian boxer
- 1989 – Rebecca Adlington, English swimmer
- 1989 – Jake Marketo, Australian rugby league player
- 1989 – Chord Overstreet, American actor and singer
- 1990 – Marianne St-Gelais, Canadian speed skater
- 1990 – Edin Višća, Bosnian footballer
- 1991 – Phil Pressey, American basketball player and coach
- 1991 – Ed Sheeran, English singer-songwriter, guitarist, and producer
- 1991 – Jeremy Allen White, American actor
- 1991 – Bonnie Wright, English actress, filmmaker, and activist
- 1992 – Meaghan Martin, American actress and singer
- 1993 – Marc Márquez, Spanish motorcycle racer
- 1994 – Mason Jobst, American ice hockey player
- 1995 – Madison Keys, American tennis player
- 1996 – Sebastian Aho, Swedish ice hockey player
- 1996 – Sasha Pieterse, South African-American actress and singer-songwriter
- 1997 – Gaetano Castrovilli, Italian footballer
- 1998 – Harry Grant, Australian rugby league player
- 1998 – Devin White, American football player
- 1999 – Alex de Minaur, Australian tennis player

== Deaths ==
=== Pre-1600 ===
- 364 – Jovian, Roman emperor (born 331)
- 440 – Mesrop Mashtots, Armenian monk, linguist, and theologian (born 360)
- 923 – Al-Tabari, Persian scholar (born 839)
- 1178 – Evermode of Ratzeburg, bishop of Ratzeburg
- 1220 – Theobald I, Duke of Lorraine
- 1339 – Otto, Duke of Austria (born 1301)
- 1371 – Ivan Alexander of Bulgaria
- 1500 – Adolph, Count of Oldenburg-Delmenhorst, German noble (born before 1463)
- 1600 – Giordano Bruno, Italian mathematician, astronomer, and philosopher (born 1548)

=== 1601–1900 ===
- 1609 – Ferdinando I de' Medici, Grand Duke of Tuscany (born 1549)
- 1624 – Juan de Mariana, Spanish priest and historian (born 1536)
- 1659 – Abel Servien, French politician, French Minister of Finance (born 1593)
- 1673 – Molière, French actor and playwright (born 1622)
- 1680 – Denzil Holles, 1st Baron Holles, English politician (born 1599)
- 1680 – Jan Swammerdam, Dutch biologist, zoologist, and entomologist (born 1637)
- 1715 – Antoine Galland, French orientalist and archaeologist (born 1646)
- 1732 – Louis Marchand, French organist and composer (born 1669)
- 1768 – Arthur Onslow, English lawyer and politician, Speaker of the House of Commons (born 1691)
- 1841 – Ferdinando Carulli, Italian guitarist and composer (born 1770)
- 1849 – María de las Mercedes Barbudo, Puerto Rican political activist, the first woman Independentista in the island (born 1773)
- 1854 – John Martin, English painter, engraver, and illustrator (born 1789)
- 1856 – Heinrich Heine, German journalist and poet (born 1797)
- 1872 – Gomburza, Filipino priests:
  - José Burgos (born 1837)
  - Mariano Gómes (born 1799)
  - Jacinto Zamora (born 1835)
- 1874 – Adolphe Quetelet, Belgian astronomer, mathematician, and sociologist (born 1796)
- 1890 – Christopher Latham Sholes, American publisher and politician (born 1819)

=== 1901–present ===
- 1905 – Grand Duke Sergei Alexandrovich of Russia, fifth son and seventh child of Tsar Alexander II (born 1857)
- 1905 – William Bickerton, English-American religious leader, leader in the Latter Day Saint movement (born 1815)
- 1909 – Geronimo, American tribal leader (born 1829)
- 1912 – Edgar Evans, Welsh sailor and explorer (born 1876)
- 1919 – Wilfrid Laurier, Canadian lawyer and politician, 7th Prime Minister of Canada (born 1841)
- 1924 – Oskar Merikanto, Finnish composer (born 1868)
- 1934 – Albert I of Belgium (born 1875)
- 1934 – Siegbert Tarrasch, German chess player and theoretician (born 1862)
- 1939 – Willy Hess, German violinist and educator (born 1859)
- 1946 – Dorothy Gibson, American actress and singer (born 1889)
- 1948 – Yahya Muhammad Hamid ed-Din, Imam of Yemen (born 1904)
- 1961 – Lütfi Kırdar, Turkish physician and politician, Turkish Minister of Health (born 1887)
- 1961 – Nita Naldi, American actress (born 1894)
- 1962 – Joseph Kearns, American actor (born 1907)
- 1962 – Bruno Walter, German-American pianist, composer, and conductor (born 1876)
- 1963 – Mijo Mirković, Croatian economist and author (born 1898)
- 1966 – Hans Hofmann, German-American painter (born 1880)
- 1969 – Berry L. Cannon, American aquanaut (born 1935)
- 1970 – Shmuel Yosef Agnon, Ukrainian-Israeli novelist, short story writer, and poet, Nobel Prize laureate (born 1888)
- 1970 – Alfred Newman, American composer and conductor (born 1900)
- 1972 – Friday Hassler, American race car driver (born 1935)
- 1977 – Janani Luwum, Ugandan archbishop and saint (born 1922)
- 1979 – William Gargan, American actor (born 1905)
- 1982 – Nestor Chylak, American baseball player and umpire (born 1922)
- 1982 – Thelonious Monk, American pianist and composer (born 1917)
- 1982 – Lee Strasberg, American actor and director (born 1901)
- 1986 – Jiddu Krishnamurti, Indian-American philosopher and author (born 1895)
- 1988 – John M. Allegro, English archaeologist and scholar (born 1923)
- 1988 – Karpoori Thakur, Indian educator and politician, 11th Chief Minister of Bihar (born 1924)
- 1989 – Lefty Gomez, American baseball player (born 1908)
- 1990 – Jean-Marc Boivin, French mountaineer, skier, and pilot (born 1951)
- 1994 – Randy Shilts, American journalist and author (born 1951)
- 1998 – Ernst Jünger, German soldier, philosopher, and author (born 1895)
- 2003 – Steve Bechler, American baseball player (born 1979)
- 2004 – José López Portillo, Mexican lawyer and politician, 51st President of Mexico (born 1920)
- 2005 – Dan O'Herlihy, Irish-American actor (born 1919)
- 2005 – Omar Sívori, Argentinian footballer and manager (born 1935)
- 2006 – Ray Barretto, American drummer (born 1929)
- 2009 – Conchita Cintrón, Chilean bullfighter and journalist (born 1922)
- 2010 – Kathryn Grayson, American actress and singer (born 1922)
- 2012 – Robert Carr, English engineer and politician, Shadow Chancellor of the Exchequer (born 1916)
- 2012 – Michael Davis, American singer-songwriter and bass player (born 1943)
- 2012 – Nicolaas Govert de Bruijn, Dutch mathematician and theorist (born 1918)
- 2012 – Ulric Neisser, German-American psychologist and academic (born 1928)
- 2013 – Richard Briers, English actor (born 1934)
- 2013 – Shmulik Kraus, Israeli singer-songwriter and actor (born 1935)
- 2013 – Sophie Kurys, American baseball player (born 1925)
- 2013 – Mindy McCready, American singer-songwriter (born 1975)
- 2014 – Bob Casale, American guitarist, keyboard player, and producer (born 1952)
- 2014 – Peter Florin, German politician and diplomat, President of the United Nations General Assembly (born 1921)
- 2014 – Wayne Smith, Jamaican singer (born 1965)
- 2015 – John Barrow, American-Canadian football player and manager (born 1935)
- 2015 – Cathy Ubels-Veen, Dutch politician (born 1928)
- 2015 – Liu Yudi, Chinese general and pilot (born 1923)
- 2016 – Andy Ganteaume, Trinidadian cricketer (born 1921)
- 2016 – Mohamed Hassanein Heikal, Egyptian journalist (born 1923)
- 2016 – Claude Jeancolas, French historian, author, and journalist (born 1949)
- 2016 – Tony Phillips, American baseball player (born 1959)
- 2016 – Andrzej Żuławski, Polish film director (born 1940)
- 2017 – Robert H. Michel, American politician (born 1923)
- 2017 – Michael Novak, American Roman Catholic theologian (born 1933)
- 2021 – Rush Limbaugh, American talk show host and author (born 1951)
- 2021 – Seif Sharif Hamad, Tanzanian politician (born 1943)
- 2024 – Gamini Jayawickrama Perera, Sri Lankan politician (born 1941)
- 2024 – Josette Molland, WWII French Resistance member and artist (born 1923)
- 2025 – Paquita la del Barrio, Mexican singer, songwriter and actress (born 1947)
- 2025 – Frits Bolkestein, Dutch politician (born 1933)
- 2025 – Rick Buckler, English drummer, songwriter, and producer (born 1955)
- 2025 – James Harrison, Australian blood plasma donor (born 1936)
- 2026 – Jesse Jackson, American civil rights leader, activist, and politician (born 1941)
- 2026 – Shinya Yamada, Japanese musician (born 1970)

== Holidays and observances ==
- Christian feast day:
  - Seven Founders of the Servite Order
    - Alexis Falconieri
  - Constabilis
  - Donatus, Romulus, Secundian, and Companions
  - Evermode of Ratzeburg
  - Fintan of Clonenagh
  - Janani Luwum (Anglican Communion)
  - Lommán of Trim
  - Mesrop Mashtots
  - Theodore of Amasea
  - February 17 (Eastern Orthodox liturgics)
- Independence Day, celebrates the independence declaration of Kosovo in 2008, still partially recognized.
- Revolution Day (Libya)
