= Philip of Harveng =

Philip of Harveng (Philip of Harvengt) (died 1183) was a twelfth-century Premonstratensian and abbot of Bonne-Espérance Abbey in Hainault (present-day Belgium), and a theological writer.

== Biblical commentary ==
His Responsio de damnatione Salomonis addressed the puzzling biblical behaviour of Solomon. He invented novel schemes of history from the Book of Daniel in his Dream of Nebuchadnezzar (De somnio regis Nabuchodonosor) , varying the pattern of the four monarchies.

== Augustinian theology ==
His life of Augustine of Hippo was celebrated and influential. Drawing on Possidius, he also makes Augustine presage the regular canons. Associating the phrase docere verbo et exemplo (to teach by word and example) with the clerical life, in his De institutione clericorum, he put an emphasis on preaching. In the same work he argued in favour of social order.

== Other works ==
He wrote much hagiography, including a life of St. Foillan. Surviving letters to Philip, Count of Flanders and Henry I, Count of Champagne argue for knightly patronage of learning.
