= Ludolph of Ratzeburg =

Saint Ludolph of Ratzeburg
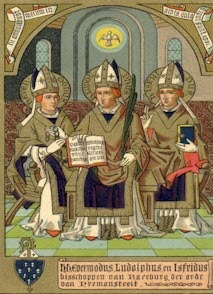
- St. Ludolph on left, with Sts. Evermode and Isfrid

Bishop of Ratzeburg
- Died: 1250
- Venerated in: Catholic Church
- Feast: 29 March

Ludolph of Ratzeburg was a Premonstratensian Bishop of Ratzeburg.

== Religious life ==
In 1236, Ludolph was appointed to the see of the newly formed Prince-Bishopric of Ratzeburg. Ludolph came into conflict with Duke Albert I of Saxony and was duly imprisoned, where he was badly beaten, and later sent into exile. In exile Ludolph was taken in by Duke John of Mecklenburg, but died soon after in 1250 because of the abuse he received in prison.

== Legacy ==
One legend tells of a soldier who was wounded when an arrowhead was embedded in his head. The soldier, who was in great pain, invoked the intercession of St. Ludolph, and he was soon able to remove the arrow and was healed.

Catholic Church titles
Regnal titles
Preceded by Petrus	Prince-Bishop of Ratzeburg; 1236–1250	Succeeded by Frederick
