= Cuissy Abbey =

Abbey in Aisne, France

Coordinates: 49°24′11″N 3°42′53″E

Cuissy Abbey was a Premonstratensian abbey in France in the diocese of Soissons, and was among the earliest foundations of the Premonstratensian Order.

== History ==
The abbey was situated at Cuissy-et-Geny, near Laon, in the département of Aisne.

It was founded in 1118 by Luc de Roucy, canon and dean of Laon, who withdrew there with a few disciples.

In 1122, the community joined the Premonstratensian order of canons regular which had just been founded by Norbert of Xanten, and a house of which had been set up in Laon with the support of the bishop. The community was raised to the status of an abbey in 1124, with Luc as the first abbot.

As one of the earliest Premonstratensian abbeys, Cuissy, along with the Abbey of St. Martin, Laon, and Floreffe Abbey, was one of the primarii inter pares, or senior houses of the order.

Cuissy developed a reputation for exceptionally fine calligraphy and manuscript illumination.

The church and monastic premises were almost entirely rebuilt in 1746, apparently leaving no medieval structures.

The abbey was dissolved in 1790 during the French Revolution, and the site, after some use for industrial purposes, was abandoned. Some surviving structures from the 17th and 18th centuries have been classed as historical monuments since 1928.
