= Frederick of Hallum =

Saint Frederick of Hallum
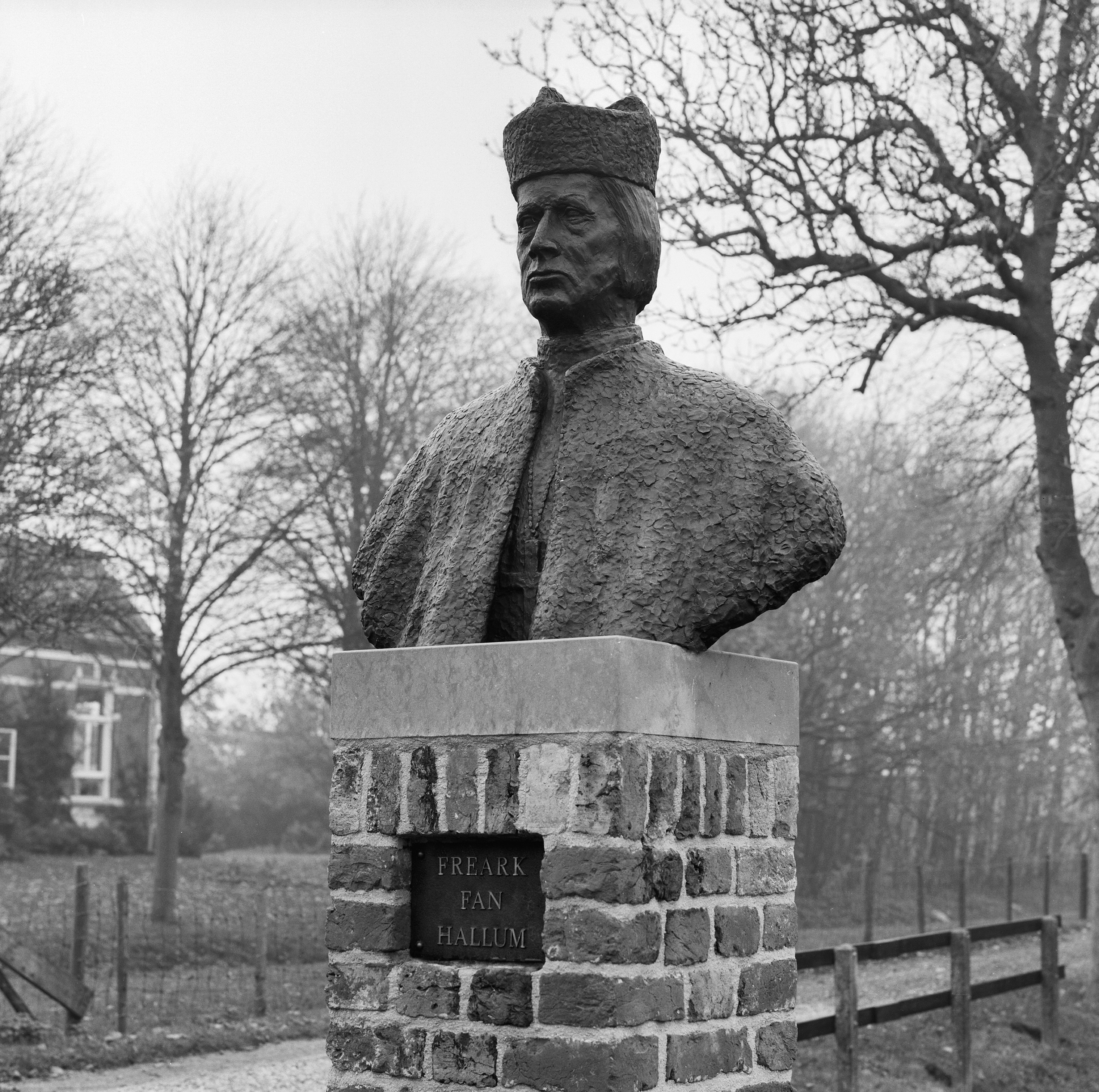
- Statue of Frederick of Hallum in Hallum

Saint
- Born: ca. 1113; Hallum, Frisia (present-day Netherlands)
- Died: 3 March 1175 (aged 62)
- Venerated in: Roman Catholic Church
- Feast: 3 March

Saint Frederick of Hallum (West Frisian: Freark fan Hallum) (c. 1113 – 5 March 1175) was a Premonstratensian priest and regular canon, founder and first abbot of Mariengaarde Abbey in Friesland in the Netherlands.

He was also the parish priest of Hallum, his birthplace, and founder of Bethlehem Abbey for Premonstratensian canonesses.

He died and was buried at Mariengaarde but in 1614, to save his relics from the Calvinists, they were removed and taken to Bonne-Espérance Abbey near Estinnes in Belgium, where they were reinterred in 1616 or 1617. They were transferred to Leffe Abbey near Dinant in 1938.

His feast day, celebrated by the Premonstratensian Order and in the Archdiocese of Utrecht, is 4 February.

== Sources ==
- Ekkart Sauser (2001). "Friedrich von Hallum". In Bautz, Traugott (ed.). Biographisch-Bibliographisches Kirchenlexikon (BBKL) (in German). Vol. 18. Herzberg: Bautz. col. 492. ISBN 3-88309-086-7.
- Norbertine Vocations: St. Frederick
