= Christoph von der Schulenburg =

German nobleman

- Born: 1514; Warpke manor in Schnega
- Died: 9 September 1580; Diesdorf
- Noble family: von der Schulenburg
- Father: Albert III von der Schulenburg
- Mother: Agathe of Bülow

Christoph von der Schulenburg (1513 – 9 September 1580) was a German nobleman. As bishop of Ratzeburg he converted to Protestantism.

== Life ==
He was born at Warpke manor in Schnega, a member of the elder "white" line of the extensive noble von der Schulenburg family. In 1538, he received the prebendary of Nusse from Bishop Georg von Blumenthal, the Prince-Bishop of Ratzeburg. A short time later, he was appointed dean in Ratzeburg and Provost of Diesdorf Abbey.

After the death of Bishop George, Christoph was unanimously elected as his successor by the cathedral chapter on 22 November 1550. This incensed Duke Francis I, who had attempted to have his seven years old son Magnus elected. Francis I sent a mercenary army into the bishopric, led by Volrad V of Mansfeld-Hinterort. On 23 May 1552, Volrad sacked the cathedral of Ratzeburg. He forced those canons who had not fled to sign a declaration against Christoph and in favour of Magnus. Volrad stayed in Ratzeburg for two months; he refrained from burning down the cathedral in exchange for 4000 thalers. The canons borrowed this money from Nicholaus Bardewik, a mayor of Lübeck, and secured the loan with a part of the chapter's territory. Lübeck then began negotiating between Christoph and Volrad. An army led by George of Holle from Brunswick recaptured the bishop's seat Stove Castle in Carlow for Christoph.

Peace returned to the bishopric after the dukes Francis I of Saxe-Lauenburg and Henry V of Brunswick-Wolfenbüttel concluded a treaty in Lüneburg on 7 June 1554. They agreed that the remaining issues would be sorted out in a court of law. However, on 5 October 1554, bishop Christoph abdicated, in favour of Christopher, the younger brother of Duke John Albert I of Mecklenburg, who had paid Christoph 10000 thaler. Francis I tried again to have his son Magnus elected, but the cathedral chapter elected Christopher of Mecklenburg instead.

After his abdication, Christoph took up a position as cathedral provost. However, after a payment of guilders 5600, he resigned from this post, and the possession of Mechow which it entailed. He had turned Lutheran some time earlier. He married Anna, a daughter of Otto von Estorff, at St. Mary's church in Veerßen (today part of Uelzen) on 24 January 1555. He remained provost of Diesdorf and became councillor to the Duke of Brunswick. He employed Stephan Praetorius to educate his son Albert IV von der Schulenburg (b. 1558). Albert IV was later raised to the rank of imperial count. Christoph died in Diesdorf.

== Footnotes ==
Christoph von der Schulenburg von der Schulenburg Born: 1513 Died: 9 September 1580
| Preceded by Georg von Blumenthal | Prince-Bishop of Ratzeburg; 1550-1554 | Succeeded by Christopher as Administrator |
