= Dorothea of Denmark, Duchess of Mecklenburg =

Dorothea of Denmark
- Duchess of Mecklenburg
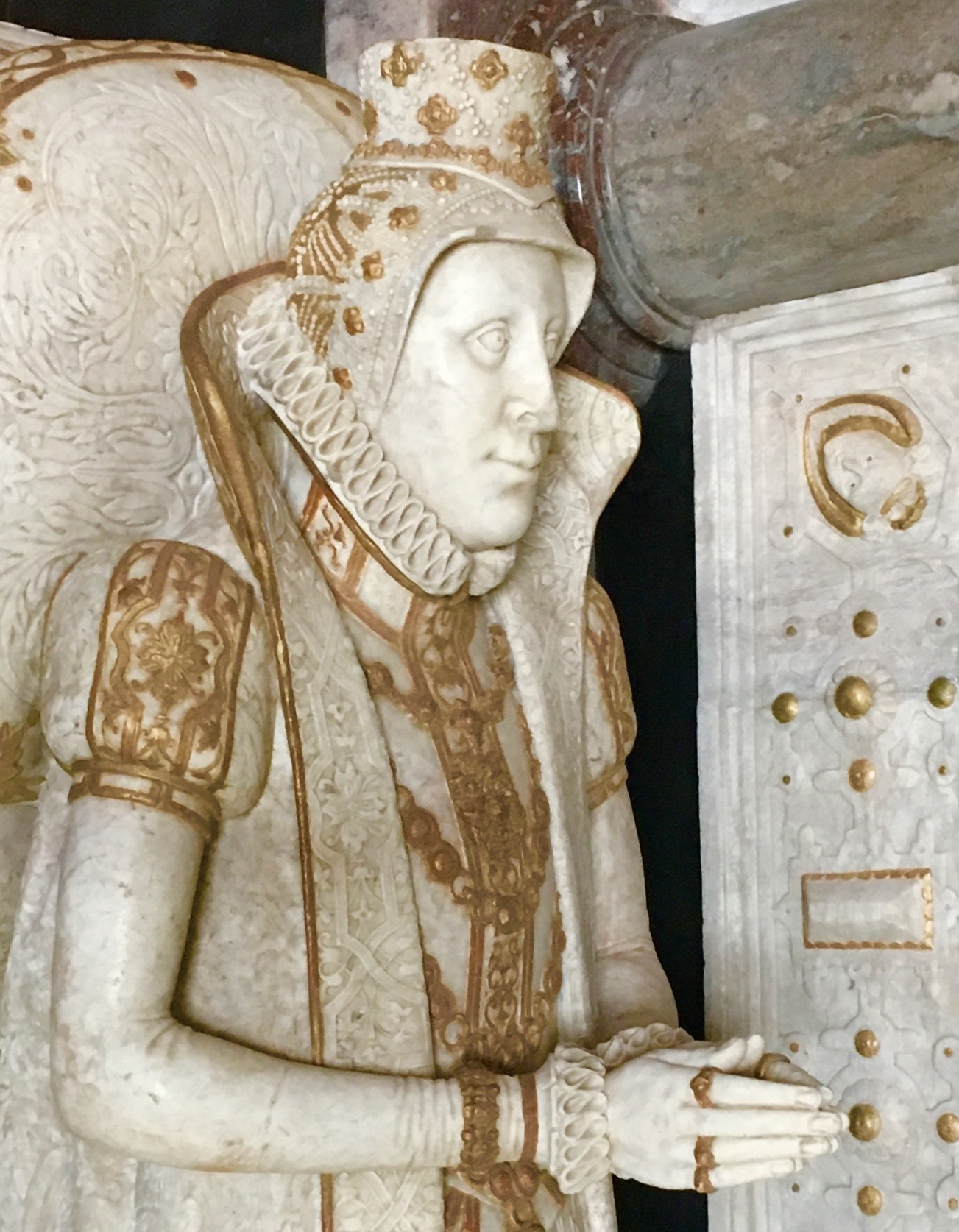
- Born: 1528
- Died: 11 November 1575 (aged 46–47)
- Spouse: Christopher, Duke of Mecklenburg-Gadebusch
- House: Oldenburg
- Father: Frederick I of Denmark
- Mother: Sophie of Pomerania

Dorothea of Denmark (1528 – 11 November 1575), was a Danish princess and a Duchess consort of Mecklenburg. She was the daughter of king Frederick I of Denmark and Sophie of Pomerania. She was married to Christopher, Duke of Mecklenburg-Gadebusch in 1573.

Dorothea was raised with her maternal grand parents in Pomerania as a child, but spent her adult life at the Danish royal court and with her mother in Kiel. She took part in the entourage of her niece Anne of Denmark at the latter's wedding in Saxony in 1548, but otherwise she lived a discreet life. She died two years after her marriage, and her sister Elizabeth of Denmark had a monument erected over her grave.

== Ancestry ==
Ancestors of Dorothea of Denmark, Duchess of Mecklenburg

16. Christian V, Count of Oldenburg
8. Dietrich, Count of Oldenburg
17. Agnes of Hohnstein-Heringen
4. Christian I of Denmark
18. Gerhard VI, Count of Holstein-Rendsburg
9. Hedvig of Holstein
19. Catherine Elisabeth of Brunswick-Lüneburg
2. Frederick I of Denmark
20. Frederick I, Elector of Brandenburg
10. John, Margrave of Brandenburg-Kulmbach
21. Elisabeth of Bavaria
5. Dorothea of Brandenburg
22. Rudolph III, Duke of Saxe-Wittenberg
11. Barbara of Saxe-Wittenberg
23. Barbara of Legnica
1. Dorothea of Denmark
24. Wartislaw IX, Duke of Pomerania
12. Eric II, Duke of Pomerania
25. Sophia of Saxe-Lauenburg
6. Bogislaw X, Duke of Pomerania
26. Bogislaw IX, Duke of Pomerania
13. Sophie of Pomerania
27. Maria of Masovia
3. Sophie of Pomerania
28. Jogaila
14. Casimir IV Jagiellon
29. Sophia of Halshany
7. Anna Jagiellon
30. Albert II of Germany
15. Elisabeth of Austria
31. Elizabeth of Luxembourg
