= Christopher, Duke of Mecklenburg =

16th-century duke of Mecklenburg-Gadebusch

Christopher of Mecklenburg
- Duke of Mecklenburg-Gadebusch
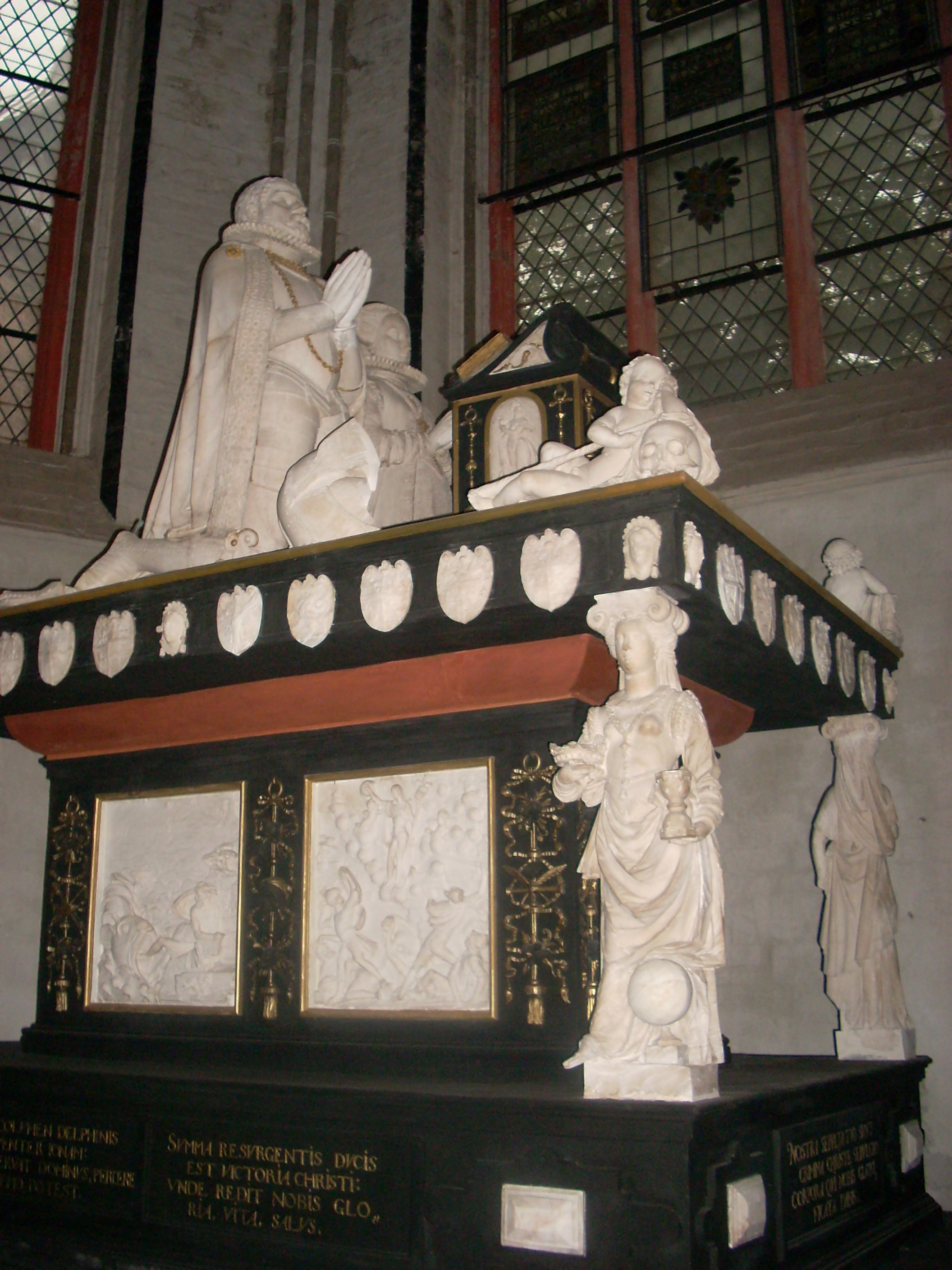
- Christopher's tomb in Schwerin Cathedral
- Born: 30 July 1537; Augsburg
- Died: 4 March 1592 (aged 54); Tempzin Abbey, near Brüel
- Buried: Schwerin Cathedral
- Noble family: Mecklenburg
- Spouses: Dorothea of Denmark (m. 1573; died 1575) Princess Elizabeth of Sweden (m. 1581)
- Issue: Margaret Elisabeth, Duchess of Mecklenburg
- Father: Albrecht VII, Duke of Mecklenburg
- Mother: Anna of Brandenburg

Christopher, Duke of Mecklenburg-Gadebusch (30 July 1537 – 4 March 1592), was a son of Albrecht VII, Duke of Mecklenburg. He was the Duke of Mecklenburg-Gadebusch and was the administrator of Ratzeburg and of the Commandery of Mirow.

== Life ==
Christopher was born in Augsburg. At the urging of his elder brother, John Albert I, the cathedral chapter appointed Christopher as the successor of the bishop Christopher I of Ratzeburg in 1554. Christopher thus became the first Lutheran administrator of the Bishopric.

In 1555, he was also elected the coadjutor of the bishop William of Riga, with the right of succession. His election was controversial and led to armed clashes. During a clash on 1 July 1556 in Koknese, Christoper and William were both taken prisoner. They were released in 1557, and Christopher was recognized as coadjutor. However, when William died in 1563, Christopher found himself unable to exercise his right of succession. Instead, he was taken prisoner again during renewed fighting against Poland. He was released in 1569, after he had renounced all claims on Riga. After his release, he returned to Mecklenburg.

He died on 4 March 1592 at Tempzin Abbey and was buried in the northern chapel of the high choir of Schwerin Cathedral. His widow commissioned a grave monument, which shows a couple kneeling before a prie-dieu. It was crafted in the workshop of the Flemish sculptor Robert Coppens, with assistance from the Pomeranian painter Georg Strachen.

== Marriages and issue ==
Christopher married his first wife on 27 October 1573 in Kolding. She was Princess Dorothea of Denmark (1528 – 11 November 1575), a daughter of King Frederick I of Denmark. She died only two years later, in Schönberg, which was the capital of the Prince-Bishopric of Ratzeburg.

He married his second wife on 7 May 1581 in Stockholm. She was Princess Elizabeth of Sweden (4 April 1549 – 12 November 1597), a daughter of King Gustav I of Sweden. With her he had a daughter:

- Margaret Elisabeth (11 July 1584 – 16 November 1616), married on 9 October 1608 to John Albert II, Duke of Mecklenburg.

After Christopher's death, she returned to Sweden, where she lived in Norrköping. She died in 1616 and was buried in Uppsala Cathedral.

== Footnotes ==
Duke Christopher of Mecklenburg House of Mecklenburg Born: 30 July 1537 Died: 4 March 1592
Regnal titles
Religious titles
Preceded by Christoph von der Schulenburg as Prince-Bishop	Administrator of the Prince-Bishopric of Ratzeburg; 1554–1592	Succeeded by Charles I of Mecklenburg
