= La Vid y Barrios =

Coordinates: 41.6333°N 3.48333°W

- Municipality
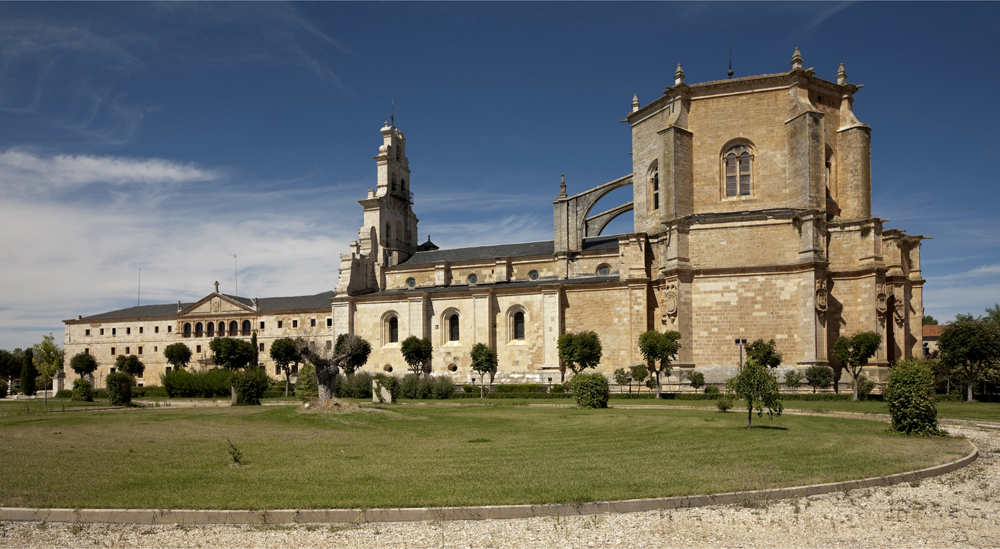
- Santa María de La Vid monastery (12th century)

- Flag Coat of arms
- Interactive map of La Vid y Barrios
- Country: Spain
- Autonomous community: Castile and León
- Province: Burgos
- Comarca: Ribera del Duero
- Seat: Zuzones

Area
  - Total: 37 km^{2} (14 sq mi)
- Elevation: 828 m (2,717 ft)

Population (2025-01-01)
  - Total: 237
  - Density: 6.4/km^{2} (17/sq mi)
- Time zone: UTC+1 (CET)
  - Summer (DST): UTC+2 (CEST)
- Postal code: 09491
- Website: http://www.lavidybarrios.es/

La Vid y Barrios is a municipality located in the province of Burgos, Castile and León, Spain. According to the 2004 census (INE), the municipality has a population of 322 inhabitants. Its seat is in Zuzones.

== Main sights ==
- Santa María de La Vid (12th century), the first Praemonstratensian monastery in Spain.
