= Monastery of Santa María de La Vid =

Monastery in La Vid y Barrios, Spain

Coordinates: 41.6289°N 3.4879°W

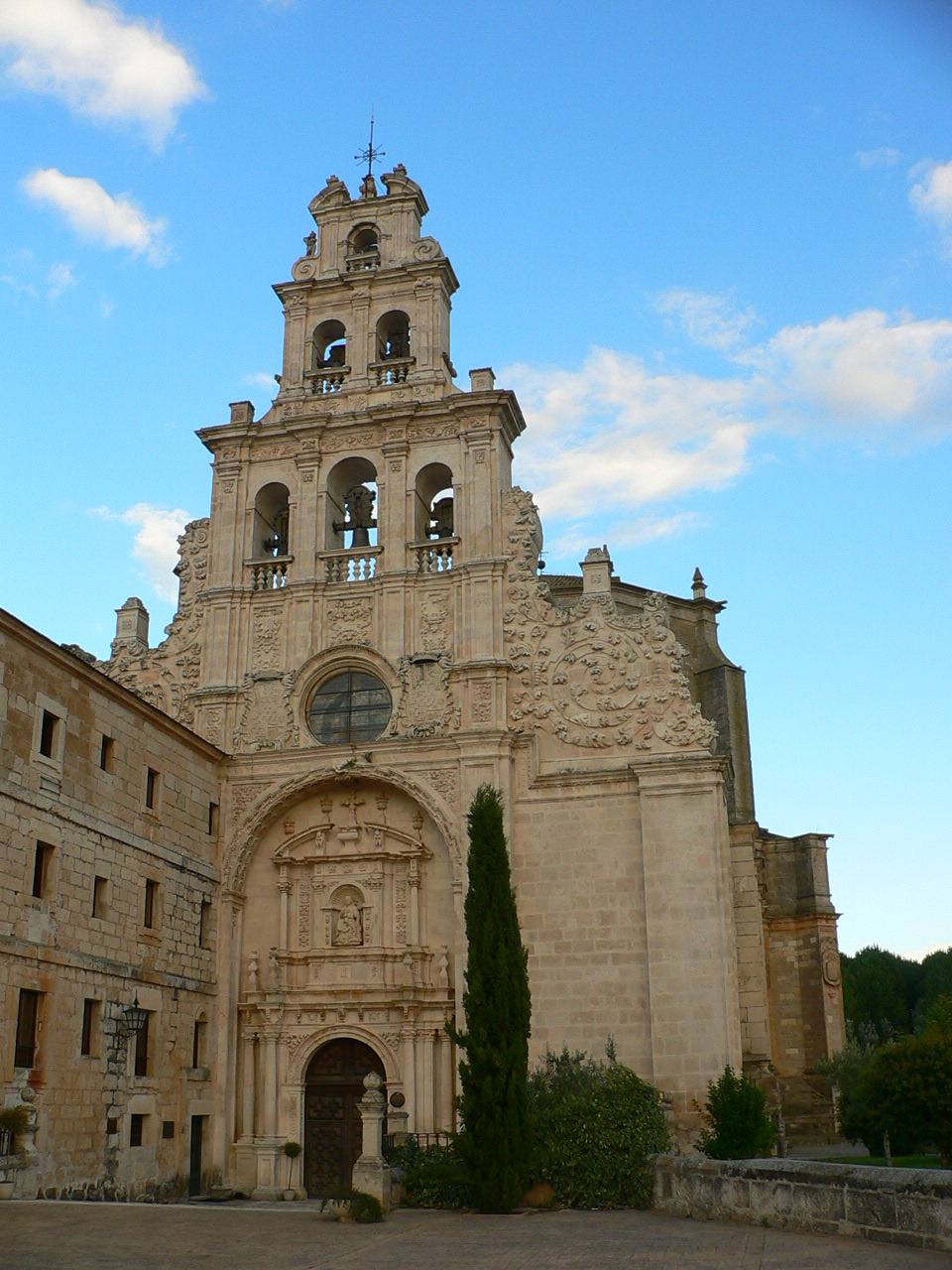
Main façade

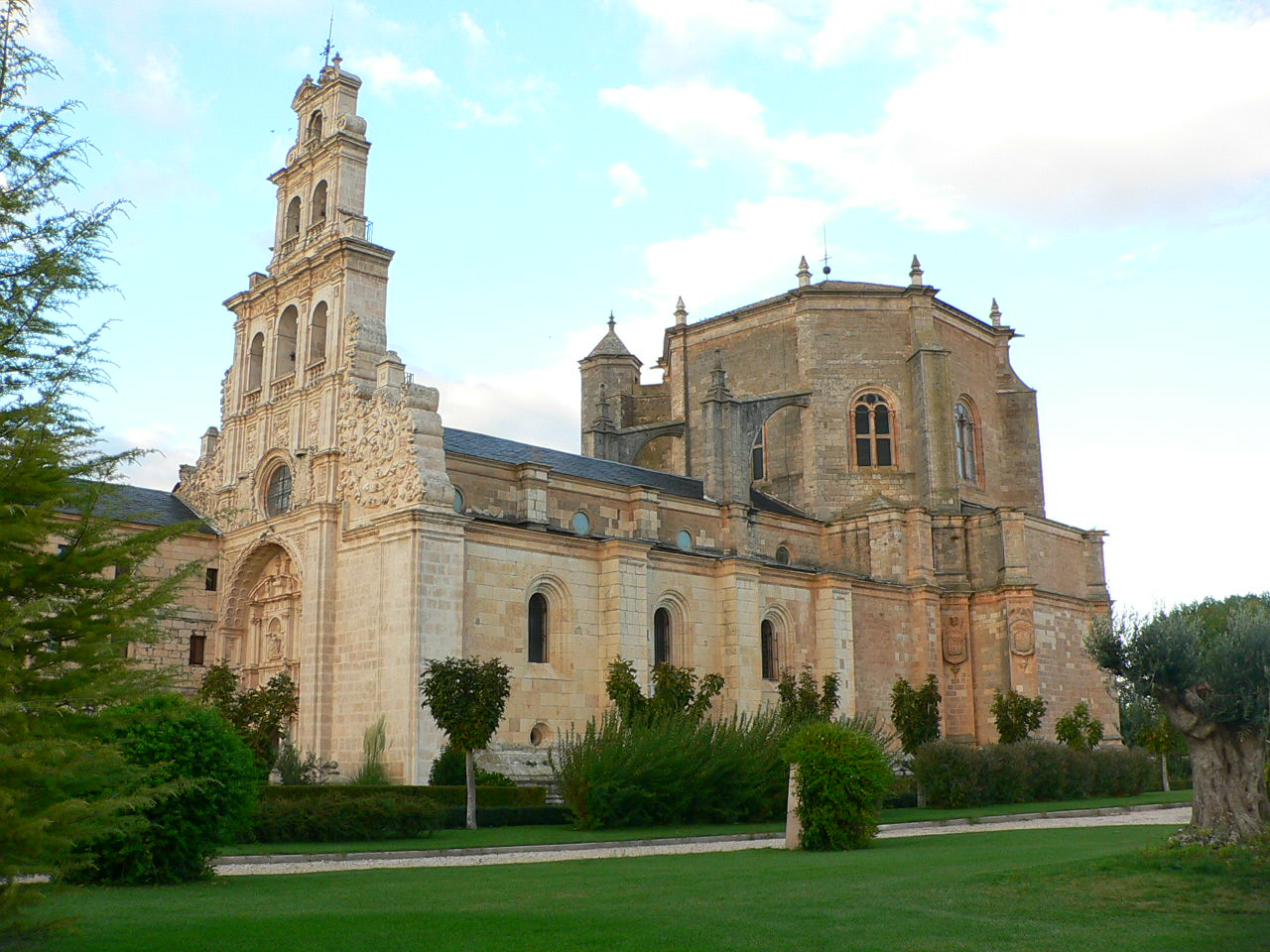
Side view

Santa María de La Vid is a monastery in Spain's Duero Valley. It is located in the municipality of La Vid y Barrios, Province of Burgos.

The monastery was initially founded on a different site called Montesacro in about 1146 by Domingo Gómez, illegitimate son of Queen Urraca of León and Castile and her lover Count Gómez González de Candespina. Domingo had become interested in the Praemonstratensian order on a visit to France, and this was the first Praemonstratensian house in Spain. The monastery was then moved to its present site in 1152, having been given the estate of La Vid by Alfonso VII of León and Castile, who was the half-brother of Domingo Gómez.

Saint Dominic, who would later found the eponymous Dominican Order, was sent to the monastery at 14 years of age, before going on to study at Palencia. He also joined the monastery as a canon and received holy orders before going on to join the cathedral chapter of Osma. A statue of Dominic in the monastery depicts him in the habit which he would have worn as a Premonstratensian canon.

The monastery was closed as a result of the ecclesiastical confiscations of Mendizábal in the 1830s. It was re-opened in the 1860s by the Augustinians who still inhabit it.
