= Abbey of Saint-Martin de Laon =

Abbey in Aisne, France

Coordinates: 49°33′46″N 3°36′43″E

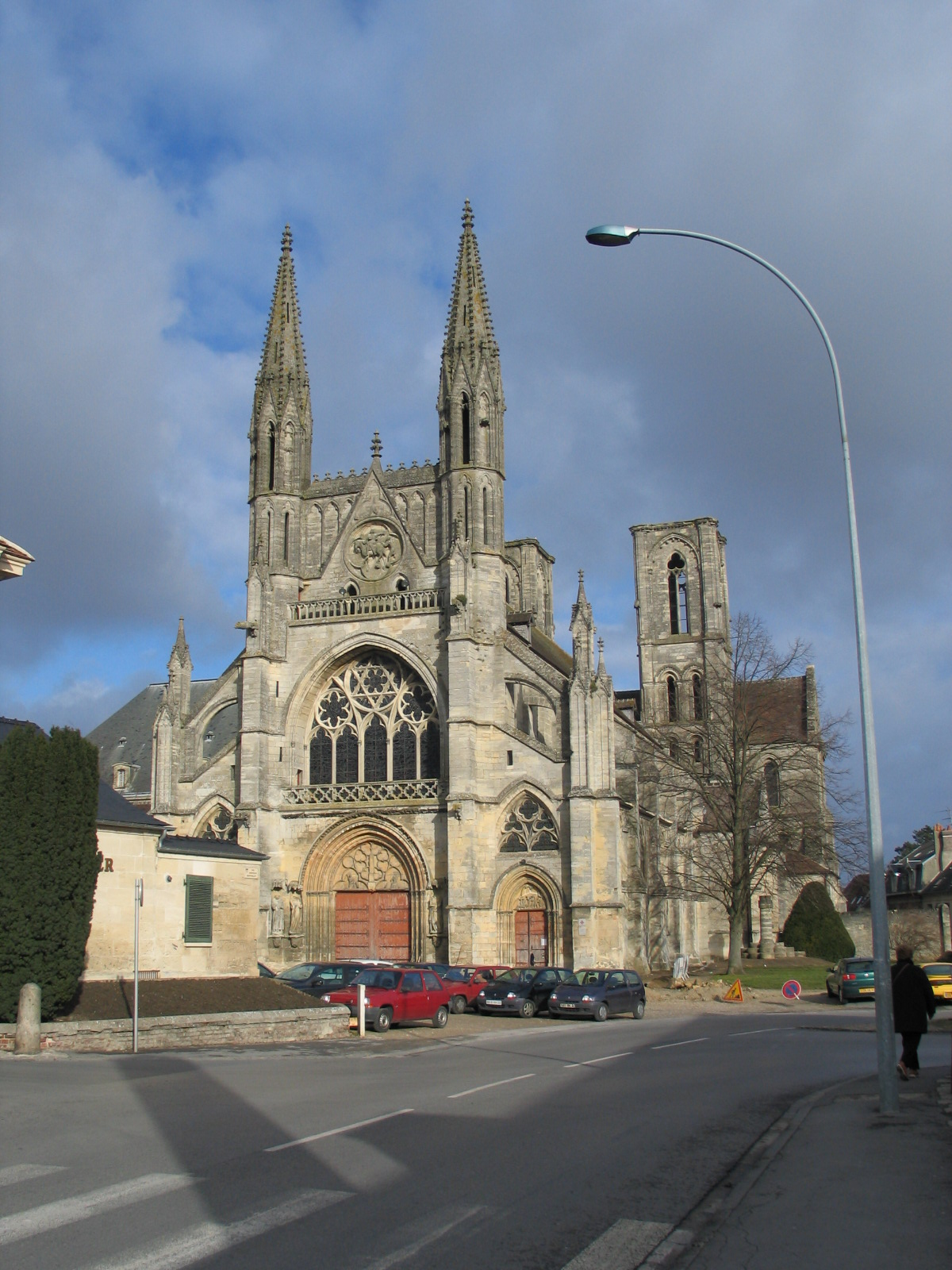
The former church of the Abbey of St. Martin, Laon

The Abbey of St. Martin, Laon, established in 1124 in Laon in the modern department of Aisne in northern France, was one of the earliest foundations of the Premonstratensian Order. Along with Cuissy Abbey and Floreffe Abbey it counted as one of the primarii inter pares, or senior houses, of the order.

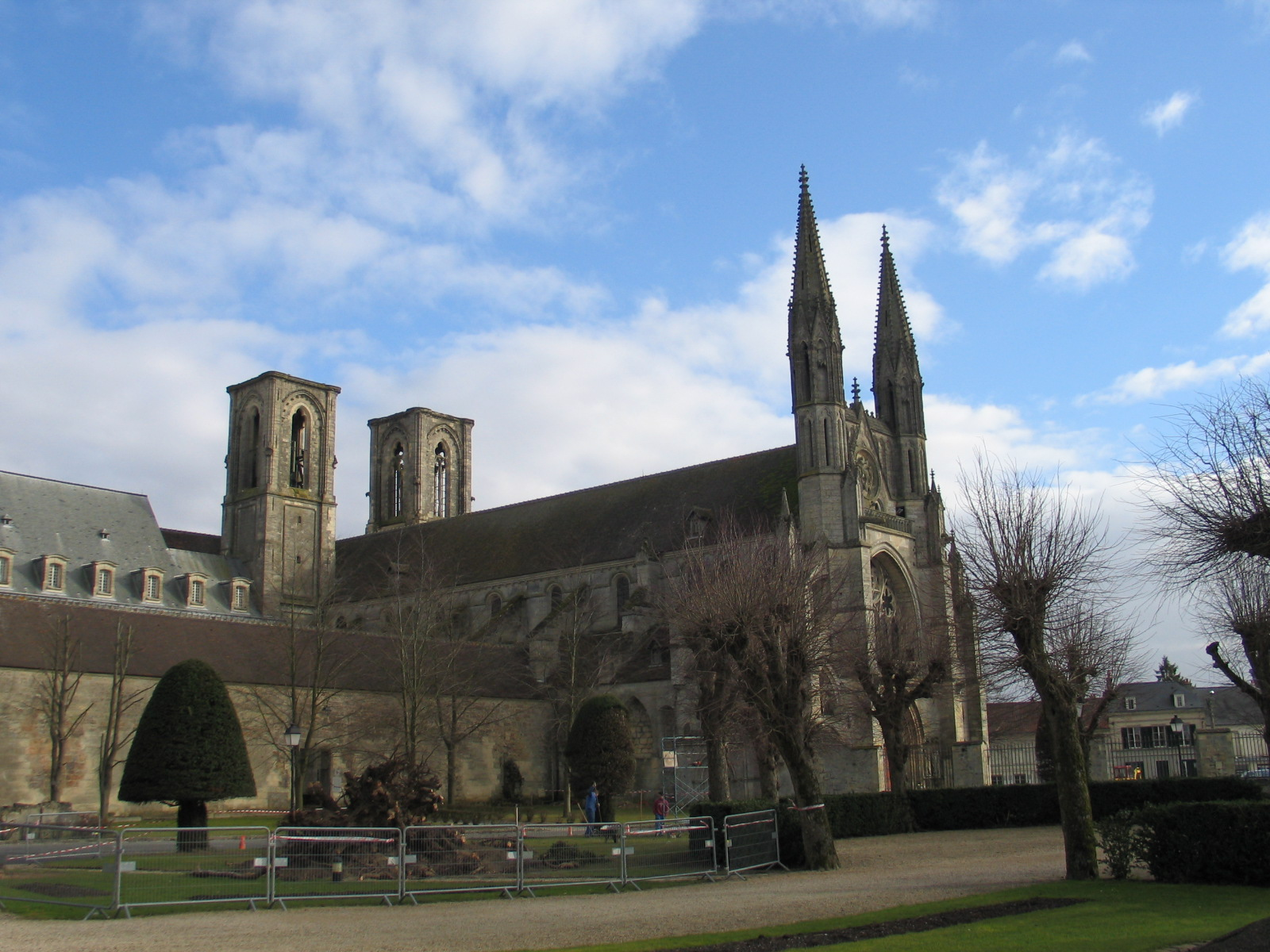
St. Martin's church, Laon

The Premonstratensian community was founded by Barthélemy of Jur, bishop of Laon, in co-operation with Saint Norbert of Xanten, who settled it with twelve canons from Prémontré Abbey. It took over the site of an earlier college of canons regular, established in the Carolingian period, which had fallen into decay.

It was dissolved in the French Revolution. The church of St. Martin in Laon, dating from the mid to late 12th century, is still in use as a parish church. The former monastic buildings were converted into a hospital in 1810.
