= Diocese of Ratzeburg =

Catholic diocese in Germany (c. 1050-1554)

The Diocese of Ratzeburg (German: Bistum Ratzeburg, Latin: Dioecesis Ratzeburgensis) is a former diocese of the Catholic Church. It was erected from the Diocese of Oldenburg c. 1050 and was suppressed in 1554. The diocese was originally a suffragan of the Archdiocese of Hamburg; in 1072 it became a suffragan of the merged entity — the "Archdiocese of Hamburg and the Diocese of Bremen". The territory of the diocese was located in what is today the states of Schleswig-Holstein (the district of Herzogtum Lauenburg) and Mecklenburg-Vorpommern (the district of Nordwestmecklenburg) in Germany. The cathedral church of the diocese — dedicated to Ss. Mary and John — is still extant in the city of Ratzeburg. Following its suppression as part of the Protestant Reformation, the remaining Catholic adherents were only represented by the Apostolic Vicariate of Northern Germany. The whole territory of the diocese is today included in the Roman Catholic Archdiocese of Hamburg.

== Establishment ==
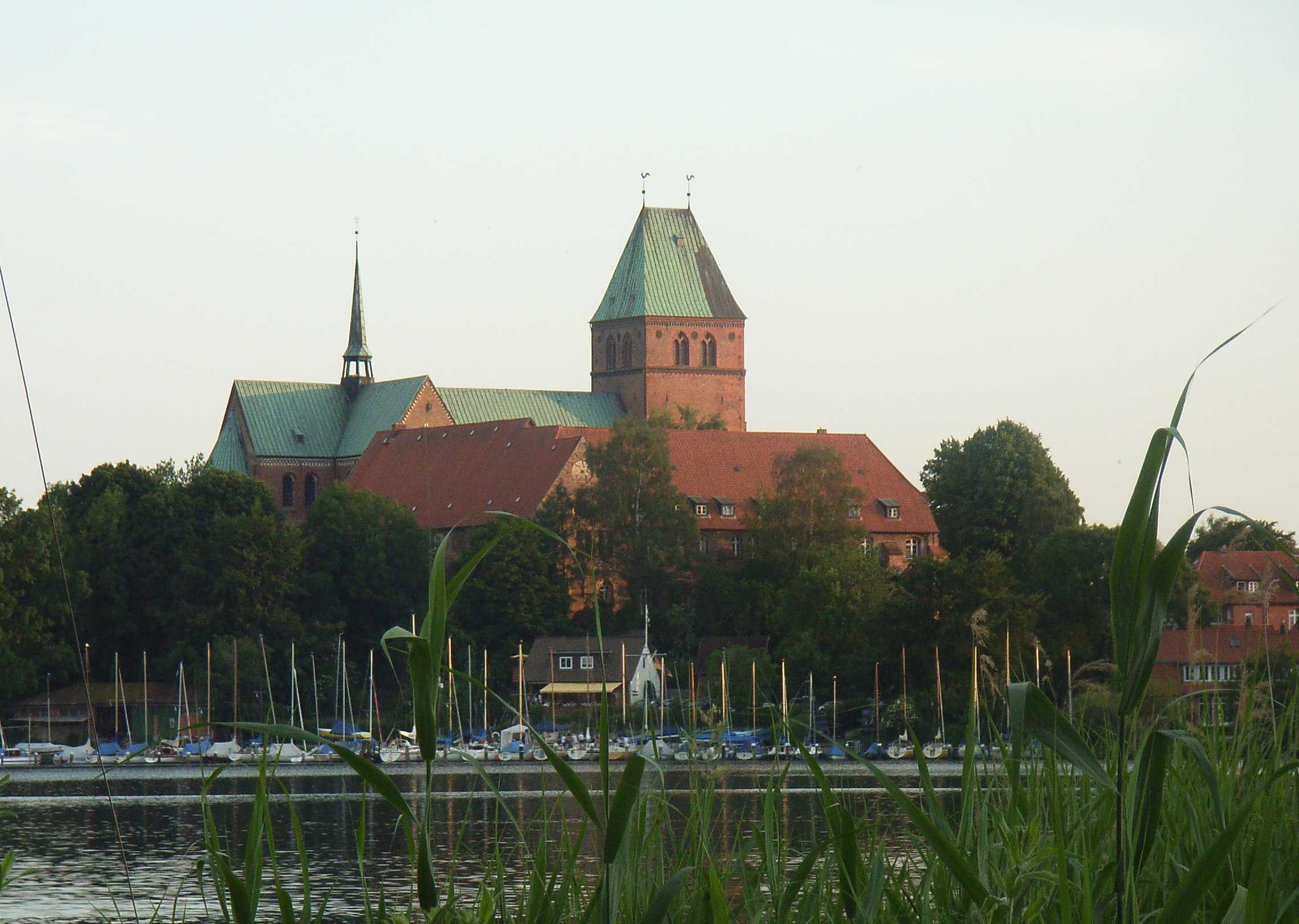
Ratzeburg Cathedral

Ratzeburg was one of the dioceses formed c. 1050 by Archbishop Adalbert of Hamburg. He appointed St. Aristo, who had just returned from Jerusalem, to the new see. Aristo may have been a wandering missionary bishop. On 15 July 1066, the pagan Wends rose against their German masters. Saint Ansverus — the Abbot of St. George's in Ratzeburg (not the later monastery bearing that name) — and several of his monks, are said to have been stoned to death. In 1154, Henry the Lion, Duke of Saxony and Hartwich I, Archbishop of Bremen, refounded the diocese. The geographic remit extended from the estuary of the Trave River on the Baltic Sea in the north; Wismar, a Baltic port in the east; Zarrentin on the Schaalsee in the south; Büchen in the south-west and Mölln in the west, both of which lie on the Elbe–Lübeck Canal.

The first bishop of the second creation was Evermode of Ratzeburg. He was a disciple of St Norbert and provost of the Monastery of Our Lady at Magdeburg. Evermode was the first of many Premonstratensian prelates to hold the see. Evermode formed the cathedral chapter of the diocese into a Premonstratensian community. The evangelization of the Wendish population was a primary goal of his episcopacy; he traveled around the diocese, preaching to the people in their native language.

The cathedral church of Ratzeburg dates from the beginning of the 12th century. It was restored, with additions, in the 15th century. The cathedral chapter consisted of the provost or dean and twelve canons. In 1504, during the episcopate of Prince-Bishop Johann V von Parkentin, the Premonstratensian regular canons of Ratzeburg cathedral were, with papal consent, made secular canons. The cathedral church, various buildings of the cathedral chapter and the episcopal manor formed a cathedral immunity district. When the Prince-Bishopric of Ratzeburg was established, the cathedral immunity district became an extraterritorial enclave of the Prince-Bishopric within the city of Ratzeburg itself.

The diocese also contained a number of monasteries: the Benedictine Abbeys of St. George, Ratzeburg (refounded in 1093), and of Wismar, where Benedictines expelled from Lübeck founded a monastery in 1239; also monasteries of women of the same order at Eldena founded in 1229, by Bishop Gottschalk of Ratzeburg, and burnt in 1290, at Rehna founded in 1237 by Prince-Bishop Ludolfus, and at Zarrentin founded in 1243. There were also Franciscans (1251) and Dominicans (1293) at Wismar.

It has been suggested that the Raseborg Castle in Finland has been named after the Bishopric of Ratzeburg.

== List of ordinaries ==
This is a list of Catholic Ordinaries of the diocese.

- Aristo — c. 1051
- Evermode — 1154–1178
- interregnum — 1178–1180
- Isfried — 1180–1204
- Philipp — 1204–1215
- Heinrich I — 1215–1228
- Lambert von Barmstede — 1228
- Gottschalk — 1229–1235
- Petrus — 1236
- Ludolph I of Ratzeburg — 1236–1250
- Friedrich — 1250–1257
- Ulrich von Blücher — 1257–1284
- Konrad — 1284–1291
- Hermann von Blücher — 1291–1309
- Marquard von Jossow — 1309–1335
- Volrad von dem Dorne — 1335–1355
- Otto von Gronow — 1355–1356
- Wipert von Blücher — 1356–1367
- Heinrich II. von Wittorf — 1367–1388
- Gerhard Holtorp — 1388–1395
- Detlef von Berkentin — 1395–1419
- Johannes I. von Trempe — 1419–1431
- Paridam von dem Knesebeck — 1431–1440
- Johannes II. Prohl — 1440–1454
- Johann III. von Preen — 1454–1461
- Ludolf II. of Ratzeburg — 1461–1466
- Johannes IV. Stalkoper — 1466–1479
- Johannes V. von Berkentin — 1479–1511
- Heinrich III. Bergmeier — 1511–1524
- Georg von Blumenthal — 1524–1550
- Christopher I von der Schulenburg (Protestant) — 1550–1554

== Prince-Bishopric ==
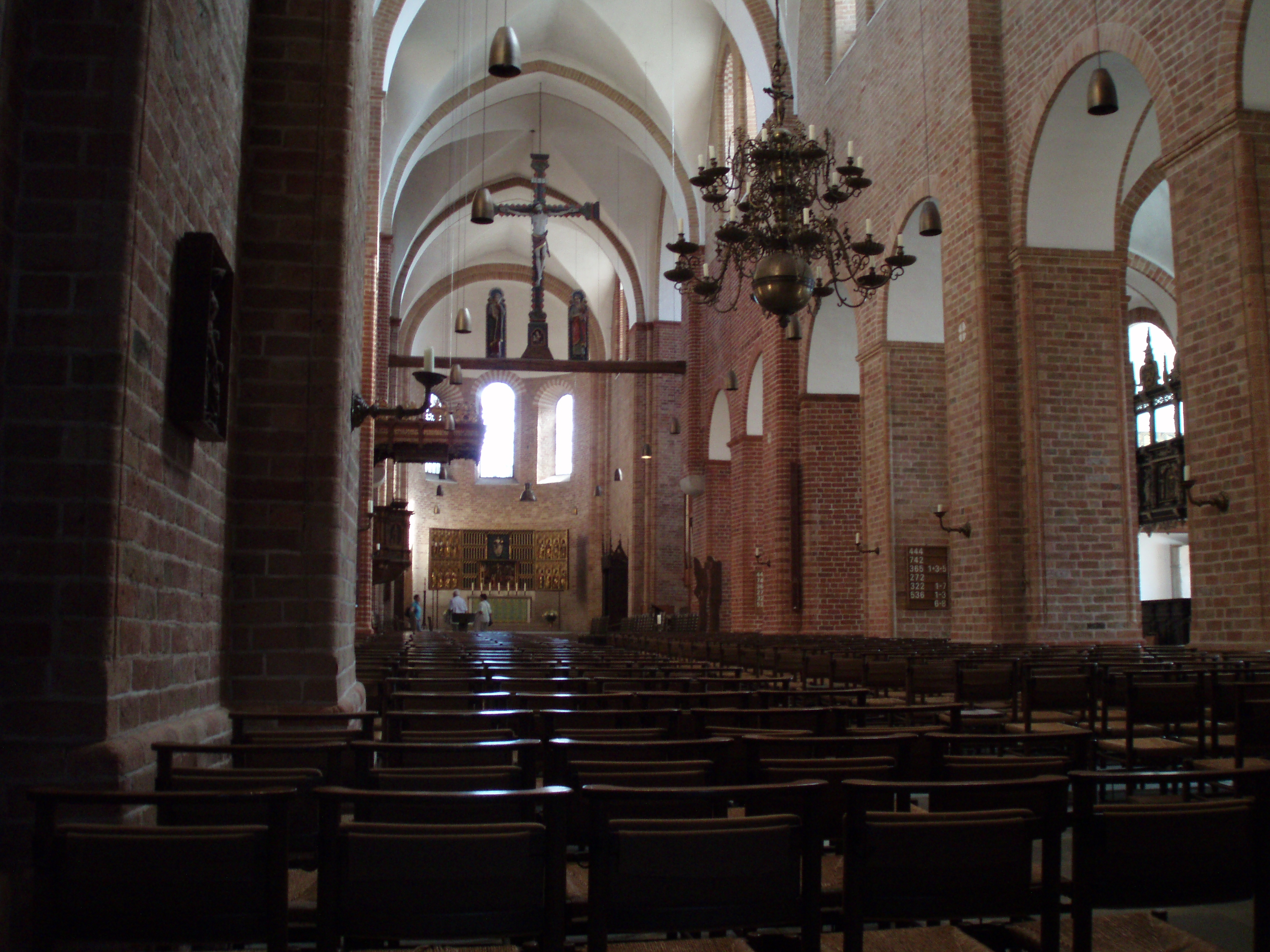
Interior of Ratzeburg Cathedral

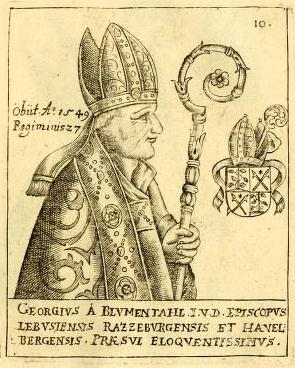
Georg von Blumenthal, the last Catholic Prince-Bishop (1490-1550)

In 1236 the Holy Roman Emperor, Frederick II, created a new prince-bishopric with Imperial immediacy which had temporal jurisdiction over the land of Butin and a number of villages outside it. Bishop Peter was the first prince-bishop and his successors inherited the titles ex officio. Succeeding prince-bishops retained this jurisdiction despite attempts by the dukes of Saxe-Lauenburg made to deprive them of it. At the beginning of the 14th century, under Bishop Markward von Jesowe, the Ratzeburg bishops began to round off the Boitin region.

== Disestablishment ==
Prince-Bishop Georg von Blumenthal (1524–50), who feuded with Thomas Aderpul, was the last Catholic bishop. During the Protestant Reformation, the cathedral chapter of Ratzeburg adhered to Lutheranism. They began to elect candidates who did not conform to canon law (i.e. they were not validly ordained or they failed to secure papal confirmation). Such candidates only held the title of "Diocesan Administrator" but were colloquially called "Prince-Bishop". Five such Diocesan Administrators were elected between 1554 and 1648. When the last Catholic bishop apostatized in 1550, he retained possession of the prince-bishopric. He was succeeded by four other Lutheran diocesan administrators from 1554 to 1648:

- 1550—1554 Christopher I von der Schulenburg
- 1554—1592: Christopher II of Mecklenburg
- 1592—1610: Charles of Mecklenburg
- 1610—1636: Augustus of Brunswick and Lunenburg, Celle line
- 1636—1648: Gustavus Adolphus of Mecklenburg-Güstrow

In 1552, the cathedral was plundered by Count Volrad von Mansfeld. In 1554, the dean and chapter converted to Lutheranism. By the terms of the Peace of Westphalia, the prince-bishopric was secularized in 1648 becoming the Principality of Ratzeburg. The principality was under the control of the Dukes of Mecklenburg. In 1701 the principality became an exclave of Mecklenburg-Strelitz.

Ratzeburg cathedral has been a proto-cathedral since the Reformation. Today, it is owned by a Lutheran congregation within the North Elbian Evangelical Lutheran Church. Most other churches in the former diocesan territory house Lutheran congregations today belonging to the North Elbian or the Evangelical Lutheran State Church of Mecklenburg.

By the beginning of the 20th century, the diocesan historical territory in the German Empire corresponded to: the district of the Duchy of Lauenburg (in the Province of Schleswig-Holstein); the bishop's own Principality of Ratzeburg in the Grand Duchy of Mecklenburg-Strelitz; the western part of the Grand Duchy of Mecklenburg-Schwerin, including Wismar but not Schwerin. The whole of it was later included in the Diocese of Osnabrück. Since January 7, 1995, the territory has been part of the Roman Catholic Archdiocese of Hamburg. Most extant Catholic churches in the region were built since the 19th century.
