= Isfrid of Ratzeburg =

Saint Isfrid of Ratzeburg
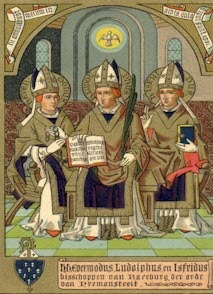
- St. Isfrid on right, with Sts. Ludolph and Evermode

Prince-Bishop of Ratzeburg
- Died: 15 June 1204; Ratzeburg, Schleswig-Holstein
- Venerated in: Roman Catholic Church
- Feast: 15 June

Isfrid of Ratzeburg was a Premonstratensian Prince-Bishop of Ratzeburg.

== Religious life ==
Isfrid was a professed canon of the Cappenberg monastery in Westphalia. In 1159, Isfrid was appointed the Provost of Jerichow. There he finished construction of the Romanesque collegiate church of St. Mary and St. Nicholas. In 1179, he succeeded Evermode of Ratzeburg as third bishop of Ratzeburg. He was known for his organizational skills and created many parishes.

He was responsible for the restoration of the monastery of Floreffe, near Namur, which had been destroyed by fire. According to Arnold of Lübeck, he succeeded in recalling all the canons that had been scattered in all directions over the past year and a half. He then consecrated the collegiate church of Postel in Belgium, then under the jurisdiction of Floreffe. The ancient annals of Stederburg present him as a man exalted for Christian wisdom, humility and fortitude. Many miracles are associated with Isfrid's life.

He died on 15 June 1204, the day on which his memory is celebrated. In the diocese of Osnabruck he enjoyed an ancient cult, confirmed in 1725 by Pope Benedict XIII to the Order of Premonstratensians. He is depicted as a bishop, with water that turned into wine and with a blind man that he healed.

Catholic Church titles
Vacant Title last held by Evermode of Ratzeburg	Bishop of Ratzeburg; 1179–1180	Bishop gained princely rank as ruler in part of the diocese
Regnal titles
Catholic Church titles
First episcopate combined in personal union with secular reign in part of the diocese	Prince-Bishop of Ratzeburg; 1180–1204	Succeeded by Philip of Ratzeburg
