= Premonstratensians =

Roman Catholic order founded in 1120

Order of Canons Regular of Prémontré
- Candidus et Canonicus Ordo Praemonstratensis
- Shield of the Premonstratensians
- Abbreviation: OPraem
- Formation: 1120
- Type: Catholic religious order
- Headquarters: Viale Giotto, 27, 00153; Rome, Italy
- Location: Worldwide
- Coordinates: 41°52′44.07″N 12°29′19.39″E
- Region served: Worldwide
- Members: 1600+ (2024)
- Abbot General: Josef Wouters
- Main organ: General Chapter
- Affiliations: Catholic Church
- Website: www.premontre.org

The Order of Canons Regular of Prémontré (Latin: Candidus et Canonicus Ordo Praemonstratensis), also known as the Premonstratensians, the Norbertines and, in Britain and Ireland, as the White Canons (from the colour of their habit), is a religious order of canons regular in the Catholic Church. They were founded in Prémontré near Laon in 1120 by Norbert of Xanten, who later became Archbishop of Magdeburg. Premonstratensians are designated by O.Praem (Ordo Praemonstratensis) following their name. They are part of the Augustinian tradition.

Norbert was a friend of Bernard of Clairvaux and was largely influenced by the Cistercian ideals as to both the manner of life and the government of his order. As the Premonstratensians are not monks but canons regular, their work often involves preaching and the exercising of pastoral ministry; they frequently serve in parishes close to their abbeys or priories.

== History ==
The order was founded in 1120. Saint Norbert had made various efforts to introduce a strict form of canonical life in various communities of canons in Germany; in 1120 he was working in the now-extinct Ancient Diocese of Laon, in Picardy, northeastern France. There, in a rural place called Prémontré, he and thirteen companions established a monastery to be the cradle of a new order. As they were canons regular, they followed the Rule of St. Augustine, but with supplementary statutes that made their life one of great austerity. Common prayer and celebration of the Eucharist was to be the sustaining dynamic of the community.

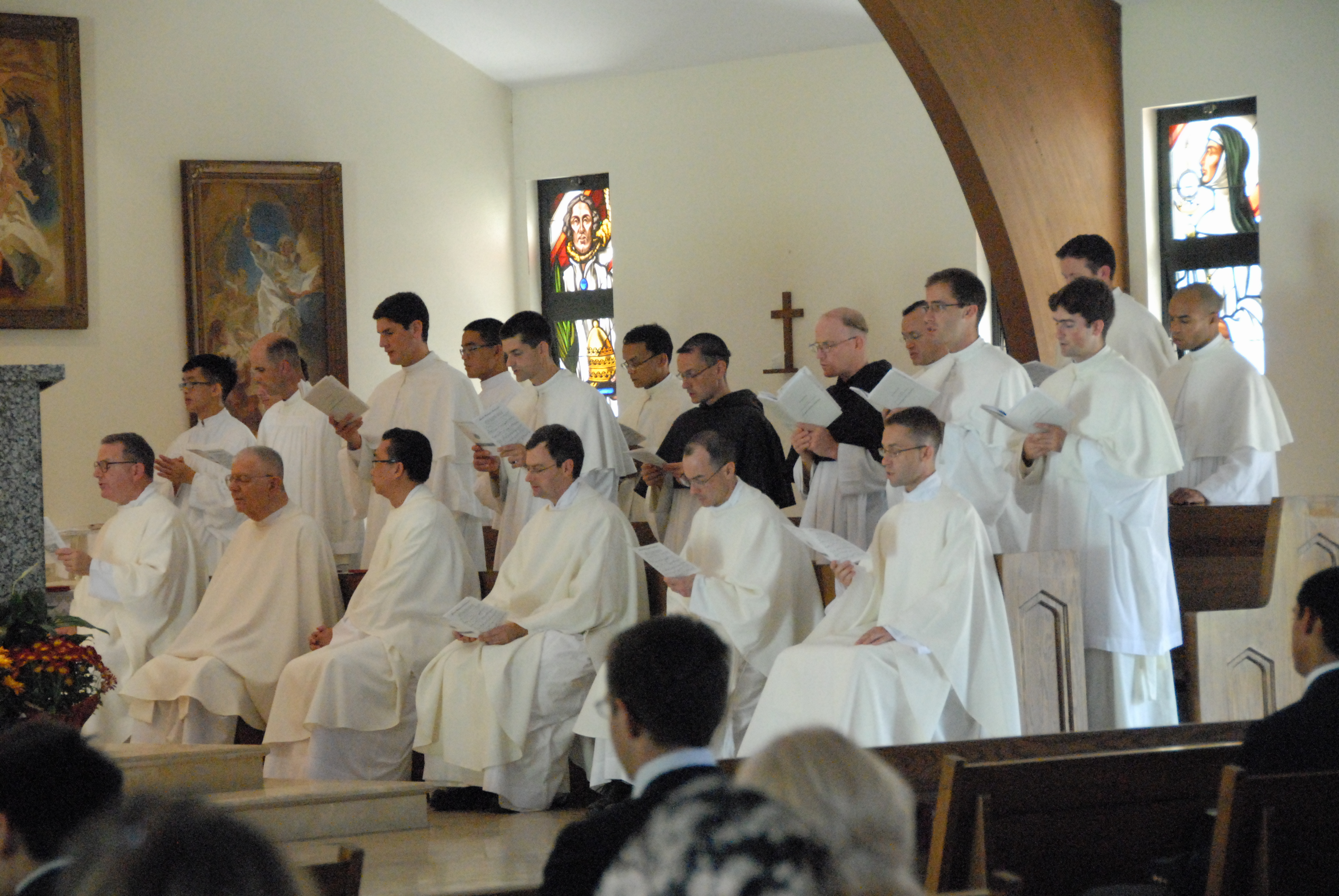
St Michaels Day Choir

In 1126, when the order received papal approbation by Pope Honorius II, there were nine houses; others were established in quick succession throughout western Europe, so that at the middle of the fourteenth century there were some 1,300 monasteries for men and 400 for women. The Norbertines played a predominant part in the conversion of the Wends and the bringing of Christianity to the territories around the Elbe and the Oder. In time, mitigations and relaxations emerged, and these gave rise to reforms and semi-independent congregations within the Order.

The Norbertines arrived in England about 1143, first at Newhouse in Lincoln, England; before the dissolution under Henry VIII there were 35 houses. Soon after their arrival in England, they founded Dryburgh Abbey in the Borders area of Scotland, which was followed by other communities at Whithorn Priory, Dercongal Abbey and Tongland Abbey all in the Borders area, as well as Fearn Abbey in the northern part of the nation. Like most orders they were almost completely devastated by the successive onslaughts of the Reformation, French Revolution, and Napoleon, but then experienced a revival in the 19th century.

By the beginning of the nineteenth century the order had become almost extinct, only eight houses surviving, all in the Habsburg monarchy. However, there was something of a resurgence, and at the start of the twentieth century there were 20 monasteries and 1000 priests. As of 2005, the number of monasteries had increased to nearly 100 and spread to every continent. In 1893, Father Bernard Pennings and two other Norbertines from Berne Abbey arrived in the United States of America to minister to Belgian immigrants in northern Wisconsin. De Pere, Wisconsin became the site of the first Norbertine Abbey in the new world.

By their nature as canons regular the Premonstratensians have always engaged in pastoral work of various kinds, including what would now be called retreat centres (nearly everywhere), and care for pilgrims (as at Conques) and, like many religious houses, have often run schools on a variety of scales (Averbode Abbey, Berne Abbey, United States, Australia). In order to support themselves, the different communities have down the centuries, and in modern times, operated small-scale manual activities (SME) such as printing (Averbode Abbey, Tongerlo Abbey, Berne Abbey), farming (Kinshasa, Ireland, Postel Abbey), forestry (Schlägl Abbey, Geras Abbey, Slovakia), and cheese-making (Postel Abbey). They have also entered agreements with breweries (Tongerlo Abbey, Postel Abbey, Park Abbey, Leffe, Grimbergen) and undertaken artistic bookbinding (in Oosterhout). Other activities have included the running of an astronomical observatory (Mira, Grimbergen).

In 2015, there were some 1000 male and 200 female members of the Order.

The Feast of All Norbertine Saints and Blesseds is celebrated internally on November 13.

The Norbertines have also had a major presence in the area of Green Bay, Wisconsin, owning WBAY television and radio stations until the mid-1970s. The Norbertines ran two local boys high schools until 1990 and still run four local schools in De Pere and Green Bay. Among these schools is St. Norbert College, the only Norbertine higher education institution in the world.

== Canonesses ==
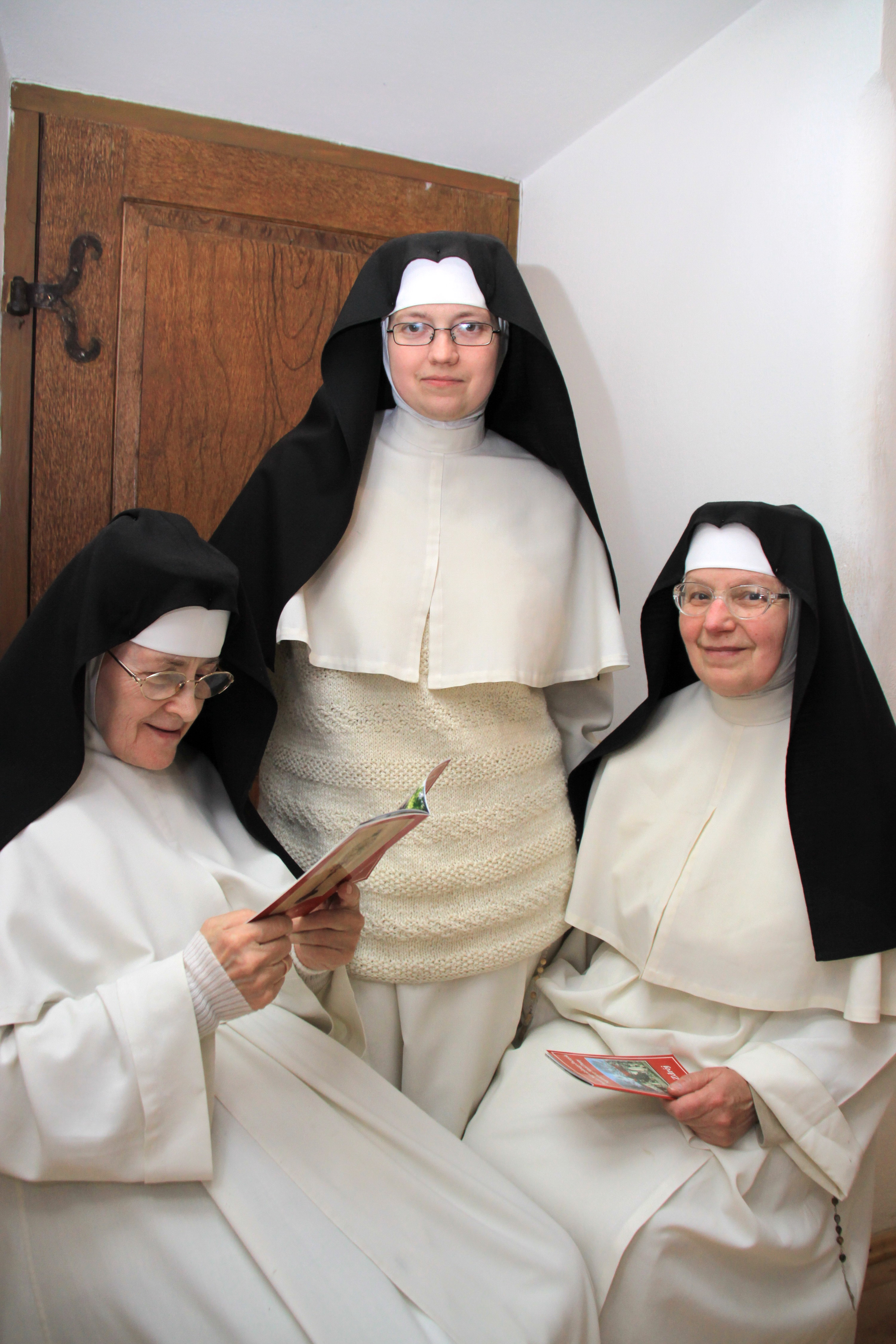
Norbertine canonesses in Imbramowice, Poland

The Order has several abbeys of women who, though technically called canonesses, follow the life of an enclosed religious order and are therefore more commonly termed Norbertine nuns. Like the Norbertine communities for men, those for women are autonomous. Unusually, within the religious communities of the Catholic Church, the Norbertine Order has always seen the spiritual life of the canonesses as being on an equal footing with that of its priests and lay brothers. In the Middle Ages, the Premonstratensians even had a few double monasteries, where men and women lived in cloisters located next to each other as part of the same abbey, the communities demonstrating their unity by sharing the church building. Today, it is common for a foundation of canonesses to have links not only with other canonesses, but also with a community of canons.

== Premonstratensian Rite ==
The Premonstratensians were among the religious orders with their own rite who kept this rite after Pope Pius V suppressed such rites with a continuous tradition of less than two hundred years. The Premonstratensian Rite was especially characterized by a ritual solemnity. The Premonstratensian Rite was also characterized by an emphasis on the Paschal mystery unique among the Latin rites. This was especially seen in the solemnity with which the daily conventional High Mass and office was celebrated during the Easter octave, especially vespers which concluded with a procession to the baptismal font, a practice paralleled among the Latin rites only in similar processions still found in the Ambrosian Rite. Another unique practice of the Premonstratensian Rite was the celebration of a daily votive Mass in honor of the Virgin Mary in each of its abbeys and priories.

== Structure ==
Since Norbertine abbeys (and most priories) are autonomous, practices and apostolates are different, depending on the needs of the local Church. Some houses are contemplative in character whilst others are highly active in pastoral ministry. However, each is guided by the Rule of Saint Augustine and the Constitutions established by the General Chapter, which is held every six years.

The general Chapter includes representatives from both male and female communities. The head of the Order, termed Abbot General, resides in Rome, and he is assisted in his duties by the Definitors (High Council) as well as commissions established for various aspects of the Order's life such as liturgy and inter-abbey communications.

== Abbeys ==
As of 2012, there were Premonstratensian abbeys or priories throughout the world: Australia, Austria, Belgium, Brazil, Canada, Czechia, Democratic Republic of the Congo, Denmark, France, Germany, Hungary, India, Ireland, Italy, Netherlands, Peru, Poland, Romania, Russia, Slovakia, South Africa, Spain, Switzerland, United Kingdom, and the USA.

There are seven circaries (Premonstratensian term for an ecclesiastical province):

Anglica Circary

- St Norbert Priory, Queens Park, Perth, Australia
- Priory of Our Lady of Sorrows, Peckham, England
- Holy Trinity Abbey, Kilnacrott, Ireland
- St. Norbert Abbey, De Pere, Wisconsin
  - Holy Spirit House of Studies, Chicago
- Daylesford Abbey, Paoli, Pennsylvania, USA
- Immaculate Conception Priory, Middletown, Delaware, USA
- St. Michael's Abbey, California, USA
  - Corpus Christi Priory
- Norbertine Canonesses of the Bethlehem Priory of St. Joseph, California, USA
- Santa Maria de la Vid Abbey, New Mexico, USA
- St.Norbert Abbey, Jamtara, Jabalpur (M.P), India
  - St. Norbert Priory, Indara, India
  - St. Norbert Priory, Mumbai, India
  - St. Norbert Study House, Nagpur, India
  - Norbertine Study House, Pune, India
- Canonry of Verapoly, Kerala, India
- Canonry of Manathawady, India
  - St. Norbert's Priory, Cape Town, South Africa
- St. Norbert Priory, Tamil Nadu, India

Bohemica Circary

- Nová Říše Monastery, Czechia
- Strahov Monastery, Czechia
  - Canonry in Holíč Slovakia
- Teplá Abbey, Czechia
- Želiv Abbey, Czechia
- Jasov Monastery, Slovakia

Brabantica Circary

- Averbode Abbey, Belgium
  - Vejle, Denmark
  - Brasschaat Priory, Belgium
- Grimbergen Abbey, Belgium
- Park Abbey, Belgium
- Postel Abbey, Belgium
- Tongerlo Abbey, Belgium
  - Parroquia San Pablo, Chiguayante, Chile
- Berne Abbey, The Netherlands
  - Priory of Essenburgh, Hierden
  - Priory ‘De Schans’, Tilburg

Gallica Circary

- Priory La Cambre, Brussels
- Abbaye Notre-Dame de Leffe, Dinant
- St. Joseph's Priory, Saint-Constant, Canada
- Abbey of St. Michael, Frigolet, France
- Abbey of St. Martin, Mondaye, France
  - Priory of St. Foy, Conques, France
  - Prieuré Notre-Dame des Neiges, Laloubère, France
- La Lucerne Abbey
- Priory of Our Lady of the Assumption, Kinshasa, Democratic Republic of Congo

Germanica Circary

- Hamborn Abbey, North Rhine-Westphalia, Germany
  - Premomonstratensian Priory in Magdeburg
- Speinshart Abbey, Bavaria
- Windberg Abbey, Bavaria
  - Roggenburg Abbey, Bavaria
- Stift Geras, Austria
- Stift Schlägl, Austria
- Stift Wilten, Tyrol

Hungarica Circary

- Abbey of St. Michael the Archangel, Csorna, Hungary
- Gödöllő Canonry, Gödöllő, Hungary
- Saint Stephen Abbey, Oradea, Romania

Portuguesa Circary

- Priory of St. Norbert, Itinga, Brazil
  - Priory of Natal
  - Pfarre Gatterhölzl, Vienna, Austria
- St Norbert Abbey, Jaú, Brazil
  - Parish of São Paulo
- Montes Claros Priory
  - Mirabela, priory parish
  - Casa de Contagem

=== Discontinued ===
- Stift Griffen, Carinthia
- Stift Pernegg, Lower Austria
- Bonne-Espérance Abbey, Belgium
- Cornillon Abbey, Belgium
- Floreffe Abbey, Belgium
- Furnes (Veurne) Abbey
- Leffe Abbey
- Ninove Abbey, Belgium
- Bellapais Abbey, Cyprus
- Hradisko Monastery, Czechia
- Børglum Abbey, Denmark
- Monastery of Bäckaskog, Skåne, 12th-century Denmark
- Monastery of Övedskloster, Skåne, 12th-century Denmark
- Monastery of Tommarp, Skåne, 12th-century Denmark
- Monastery of Vä, Skåne, 12th-century Denmark
- Ardenne Abbey, France
- L'Étanche Abbey, Lorraine, France
- Abbey of St John the Baptist, Falaise, France
- Cuissy Abbey, France
- Abbey of St. Martin, Laon, France
- Prémontré Abbey, France
- Pont-à-Mousson Abbey
- All Saints' Abbey, Germany
- Haus Meer, North Rhine-Westphalia, Germany
- Lorsch Abbey, Germany
- Obermarchtal Abbey, Germany
- Pöhlde Abbey, Germany
- Schussenried Abbey, Germany
- Steingaden Abbey, Germany
- Rot an der Rot Abbey, Germany
- Weissenau Abbey, Germany
- Zsámbék Abbey, Hungary
- Holy Trinity Abbey, Lough Key, Ireland
- Kildermot Abbey, Ireland
- St. Antimo's Abbey, Italy
- St. Olav's Abbey, Tønsberg, Norway
- Monastery of Dragsmark, Bohuslän, 13th century Norway
- Šahy - Slovakia
- Żukowo - Poland
- Monastery of Santa María la Real in Aguilar de Campoo, Aguilar de Campoo, Spain
- Santa María de La Vid, La Vid y Barrios, Burgos (currently Augustinian), Spain
- Bellelay Abbey (Abbaye de Bellelay), Bellelay, Switzerland
- Gottstatt Abbey, Orpund, Switzerland
- Romainmôtier Abbey, Romainmôtier-Envy, Switzerland
- Rüti Monastery (Kloster Rüti) and Rüti Church, Switzerland
- Alnwick Abbey, England
- Barlings Abbey, England
- Bayham Abbey, England
- Beauchief Abbey, England
- Beeleigh Abbey, England
- Blanchland Abbey, England
- Cockersand Abbey, England
- Coverham Abbey, England
- Corpus Christi Priory, England
- Croxton Abbey, England
- Dale Abbey, England
- Durford Abbey, England
- Easby Abbey, England
- Egglestone Abbey, England
- Hagnaby Abbey, England
- Halesowen Abbey, England
- Langley Abbey, England
- Lavendon Abbey, England
- Leiston Abbey, England
- Newbo Abbey, England
- Newsham Abbey, England
- Our Lady of England Priory, England
- St. Radegund's Abbey, England
- Shap Abbey, England
- Sulby Abbey, England
- Titchfield Abbey, England
- Torre Abbey, England
- Tupholme Abbey, England
- Welbeck Abbey, England
- Wendling Abbey, England
- West Langdon Abbey, England
- Dercongal Abbey, Scotland
- Dryburgh Abbey, Scotland
- Fearn Abbey, Scotland
- Soulseat Abbey, Scotland
- Tongland Abbey, Scotland
- Whithorn Priory, Scotland
- Talley Abbey ('Abaty Talyllychau'), Wales
- St. Moses the Black, Jackson, Mississippi, USA

== Notable members ==
- Robert John Cornell (1919–2009), Democratic U.S. Congressman from Wisconsin from 1975 to 1979 and professor of political science at St. Norbert College
- Prokop Diviš (1698–1765), Czech inventor
- Jan Druys (1568-1635), Flemish canon regular and abbot
- Juan de Galavís (1683–1739), Spanish archbishop in Latin America
- Charles-Hyacinthe Hugo (1667–1739), French historian and bishop
- Hermann Joseph (1150?–1241), German canon regular and mystic
- Johann Lohel (1549–1622), Bohemian prior who later became archbishop of Prague
- Werenfried van Straaten (1913–2003), Dutch priest and activist, known for his humanitarian work, particularly as founder of the international Catholic association Aid to the Church in Need
- Francis Wichmans (1596–1661), Belgian abbot, scholar, and noted theologian of his day
- Johann Zahn (1631–1707), German canon who wrote on the camera obscura and who invented an early camera

=== Norbertine saints ===
Norbertines celebrate "all Norbertine Saints and Blesseds" on November 13.

- Hermann Joseph von Steinfeld (feast day May 24)
- Norbert (died 1134, feast day June 6)
- Adrian and James of Middleburg, martyrs (died 1572, feast day July 9)
- Evermode of Ratzeburg (died 1178, feast day February 17)
- Frederick of Hallum (or of Mariengaarde) (died 1175, feast day February 4)
- Gilbert of Neuffontaines (or of Cappenberg) (died 1152, feast day October 26)
- Godfrey of Cappenberg (died 1127, feast day January 14)
- Isfrid (Isfried) of Ratzeburg (died 1204, feast day June 15),
- Ludolph of Ratzeburg (died 1250, feast day April 16)
- Siard of Mariengaarde (died 1230, feast day November 14)

==== Norbertine Blesseds ====
Norbertine Blesseds include:

- Beatrice of Engelport (died 1275, feast day March 12/13)
- Bronislava of Poland (or of Zwierzniec) (died 1259, feast day August 30)
- Gerlach of Valkenburg (died 1172, feast day January 5)
- Gertrude of Aldenberg (Altenburg), Abbess (died 1297, feast day August 13)
- Hugh of Fosse (died 1164, feast day February 10)
- Hroznata of Teplá (died 1217, feast day July 14)
- Jakob Kern of Geras (died 1924, feast day October 20)
- Oda of Bonne Rivreuille (died 1158, feast day April 20)
- Peter-Adrian Toulorge of Blanchelande, Martyr (died 1793, feast day October 13)
- Ricvera of Clastres (died 1136, feast day October 29)

== Education ==
St. Norbert College in De Pere, Wisconsin, United States, is the only institution of higher education sponsored by the Order. Elsewhere they also sponsor/operate schools or serve in pastoral care capacities at parish schools.

Schools founded or sponsored by the order include:

- Abbot Pennings High School, De Pere, Wisconsin, US (merged to form Notre Dame Academy)
- Archmere Academy, Claymont, Delaware, US
- Cardinal Gracias High School, Bandra, Maharashtra, India
- St. Michael's Preparatory School, Silverado, California, US
- St. Norbert College, Perth, Western Australia
- Saint Norbert Gymnasium (hu), Gödöllő, Hungary

== Controversies ==
Northern Ireland's Historical Abuse Inquiry investigated reports that Brendan Smyth, a member of the Norbertine Order, was allowed to continue paedophilia for more than four decades, even after Smyth himself had admitted in 1994, the same year that he was jailed for his crimes, that "Over the years of religious life it could be that I have sexually abused between 50 and 100 children. That number could even be doubled or perhaps even more." Reviewers of the case agree that there was a deliberate plot to conceal Smyth's behaviour, incompetence by his superiors at Kilnacrott Abbey.

== See also ==
- List of Premonstratensian monasteries in France
- Category:Premonstratensian monasteries in England
