= Evermode of Ratzeburg =

Norbertine bishop

Saint Evermode of Ratzeburg O.Praem
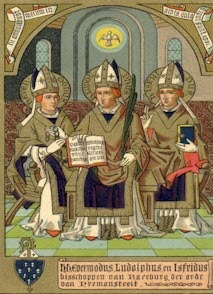
- St. Evermode (centre), flanked by Sts. Ludolph and Isfrid

Religious, bishop, Light of the Saxons and Apostle of the Wends
- Born: c. 1100; County of Hainaut, Holy Roman Empire
- Died: 17 February 1178; Ratzeburg, Prince-Bishopric of Ratzeburg, Holy Roman Empire
- Venerated in: Catholic Church (Norbertine Canons Regular; Ratzeburg)
- Canonized: 1728 (cultus confirmed) by Pope Benedict XIII
- Feast: 17 February

Evermode, or Evermod (c. 1100 – 17 February 1178), was one of the first Premonstratensian canons regular, and became the lifelong companion of Norbert of Xanten, who founded the order in France in 1120. He is sometimes referred to as the "Apostle of the Wends".

== Life ==
Evermode was born in Belgium around 1100. At about the age of twenty, he heard Norbert preach in the city of Cambrai and decided to join him. He accompanied Norbert to Antwerp and then, in 1126, to the half-pagan town of Magdeburg, where Norbert had been named as bishop. He attended to the bishop on his deathbed and ensured his burial in the church of the Norbertine Priory of Our Lady there, which Norbert had formed from the members of the cathedral chapter. A few months before his death in 1134, Norbert appointed Evermode acting provost of the Priory of Gottesgnaden.

In 1138 Evermode was elected as the provost of the Priory of Our Lady in Magdeburg. In this post, he oversaw the foundations of new Premonstratensian communities in Havelberg, Jerichow, Quedlinburg and Pöhlde, serving in that post until 1154, when he was named the Bishop of Ratzeburg, the first since its destruction by the Wends in 1066. He was consecrated bishop by the Archbishop of Mainz. He formed the newly named cathedral chapter of the diocese into a Premonstratensian community. The evangelization of the Wendish population was a primary goal of his episcopacy, and he traveled around the diocese, preaching to the people in their native language.

Worn out by his labors, Evermode died in 1178, and was buried in the cathedral he had built. He was succeeded by his fellow Norbertine, Isfrid.

== Veneration ==
His cult was approved by Pope Benedict XIII in 1728. Evermode is honored as a saint in the Archdiocese of Hamburg, which now covers that region, and in the Norbertine Order. His feast day is celebrated on 17 February.

He is depicted as a bishop bestowing a blessing.

== Namesake ==
The Evermode Institute of the Corpus Christi Priory, St. Michael Abbey is named in honor of St. Evermode.

== See also ==
- Saint Evermode of Ratzeburg, patron saint archive

Catholic Church titles
Preceded by Aristo (died 1066)	Bishop of Ratzeburg; 1154-1178	Vacant Title next held by Isfrid of Ratzeburg
