= Saint-Nazaire de Barbadell church =

French chapel

Coordinates: 42°38′18″N 2°34′59″E

church of Saint-Nazaire de Barbadell
- Sant Nazari de Barbadell
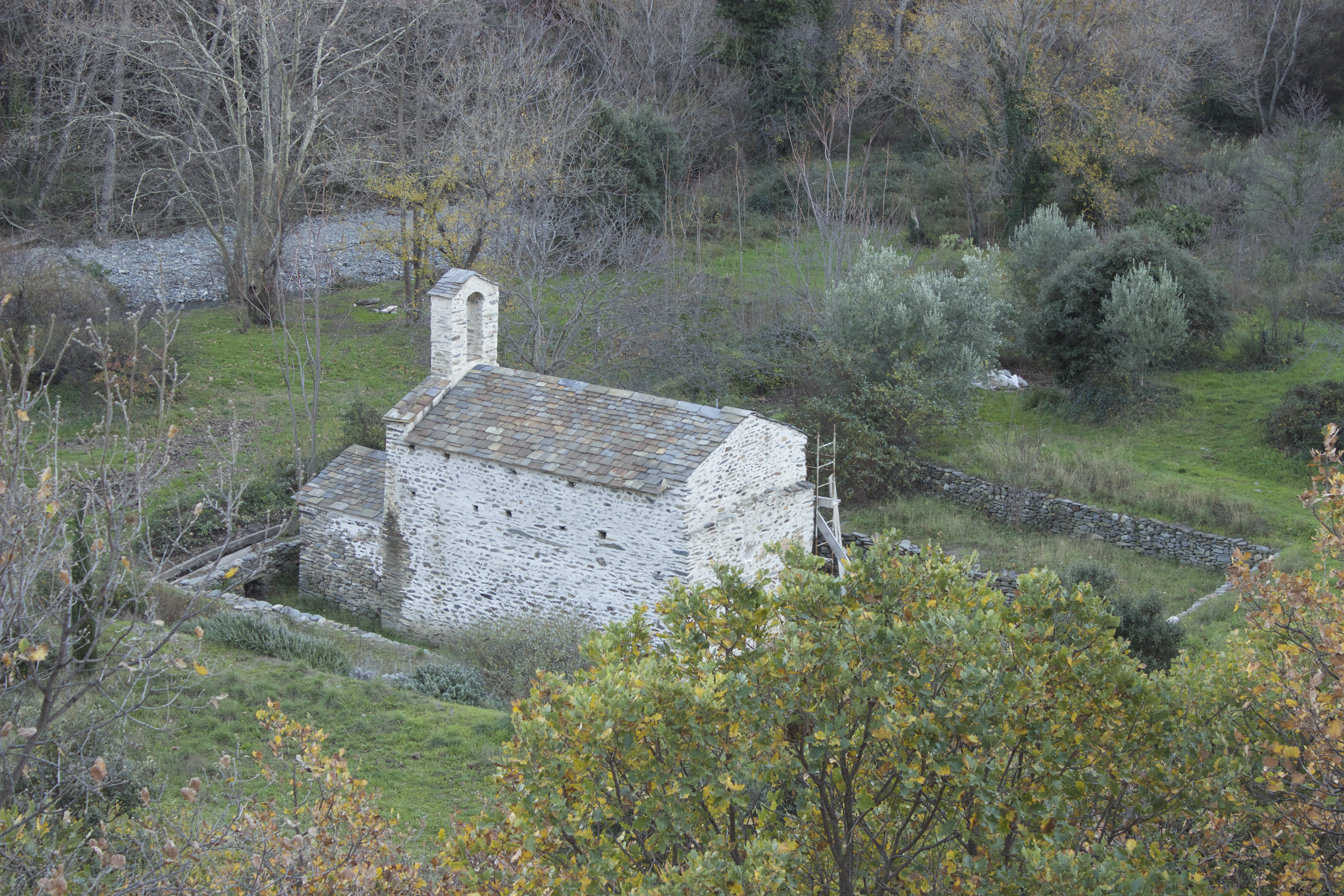
- General view of the building.

Religion
- Affiliation: Catholic
- District: Bouleternère
- Province: Pyrénées-Orientales
- Region: Occitanie

Location
- Country: France
- Interactive map of church of Saint-Nazaire de Barbadell

Architecture
- Style: Romanesque
- Completed: 17th century

The church of Saint-Nazaire de Barbadell (Catalan: Sant Nazari de Barbadell) is a disused Romanesque and pre-Romanesque Catholic church in Bouleternère, in the French department of Pyrénées-Orientales.

Probably built before the year 1000, the church of Saint-Nazari developed with the village of Barbadell from the 11th to the 13th centuries, of which it was the parish church. In the 14th century, for reasons that are unclear (floods, wars, plague or a combination of several of these factors), Barbadell suffered severe depopulation, eventually disappearing completely in the course of the 16th century. The church of Saint-Nazaire, now an isolated chapel, was not forgotten by the people of Bouleternère, who continued to make donations to it in their wills.

In the 18th century, a succession of hermits took up residence at Saint-Nazaire, maintaining the church and keeping it in worship, thus saving it from the abandonment experienced by many rural churches at the time of the French Revolution. However, this abandonment was only delayed: in the course of the 19th century, the old church changed ownership several times, and was then divided between several properties. It was transformed into a building for agricultural use, and then into a dwelling, which seriously deteriorated it.

The old church has been completely renovated since 1997, when the three owners founded a conservation association to which they bequeathed the building.

In the 21st century, the church regained its medieval appearance. It comprises a rectangular nave oriented west-east, extended by a flat apse whose axis is slightly offset to the south. The walls of the nave are reinforced with double arches and formets supporting a barrel vault. The building is topped by a bell-wall and covered with a slate roof. Traces of 18th-century painted decoration remain on the interior walls.

The church of Saint-Nazaire is surrounded by low walls and ancient canals, showing that the inhabitants of Barbadell have had to battle floods and high water from the river Boulès, on the banks of which this building is built, many times over the centuries.

== Situation ==
The Canigou massif is the most easterly of the Pyrenean mountain ranges, rising above 2,000 m in altitude. Located in the French department of Pyrénées-Orientales, it separates the natural and historic Catalan regions of Vallespir to the south and Conflent to the north. Between Canigou and the Mediterranean Sea lies the Aspres massif, a Pyrenean foothill of hills covered with Mediterranean forest, and the Roussillon plain. This region is subject to a Mediterranean climate, hot and dry in summer, but sometimes marked by very heavy rainfall.

A river born in the Canigou massif, the Boulès crosses the Aspres from south to north through steep gorges before flowing into the Têt river in Conflent. Like other rivers in the region, the Boulès has a highly irregular flow pattern, subject to major floods that can be devastating.

The church of Saint-Nazaire de Barbadell stands on the banks of the Boulès, where the gorges widen to form a small plain surrounded by steep but low-lying mountains. The building is built on an alluvial fan of a stream called ravin de Saint-Nazaire, which flows into the Boulès a few meters from the church, at an altitude of 200 m. The church is part of the French commune of Bouleternère, in the Pyrénées-Orientales department.

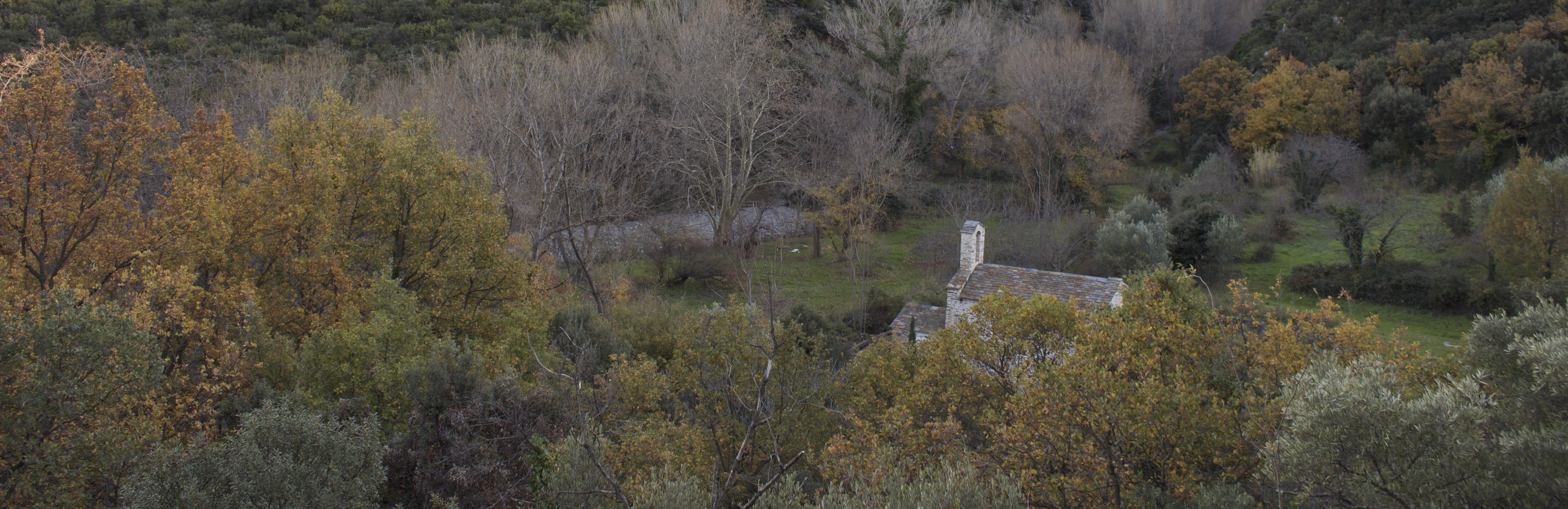
Saint-Nazaire church in its environment.

The chapel can be reached from Bouleternère via the D618 departmental road, which winds along the Boulès valley and crosses the Aspres from one side to the other, linking the Conflent with the Vallespir (at Amélie-les-Bains-Palalda). This route also leads to the Serrabone priory, another Romanesque church located a few kilometers south of the Barbadell church. The route from the village capital to the church of Saint-Nazaire is around 1.5 km long.

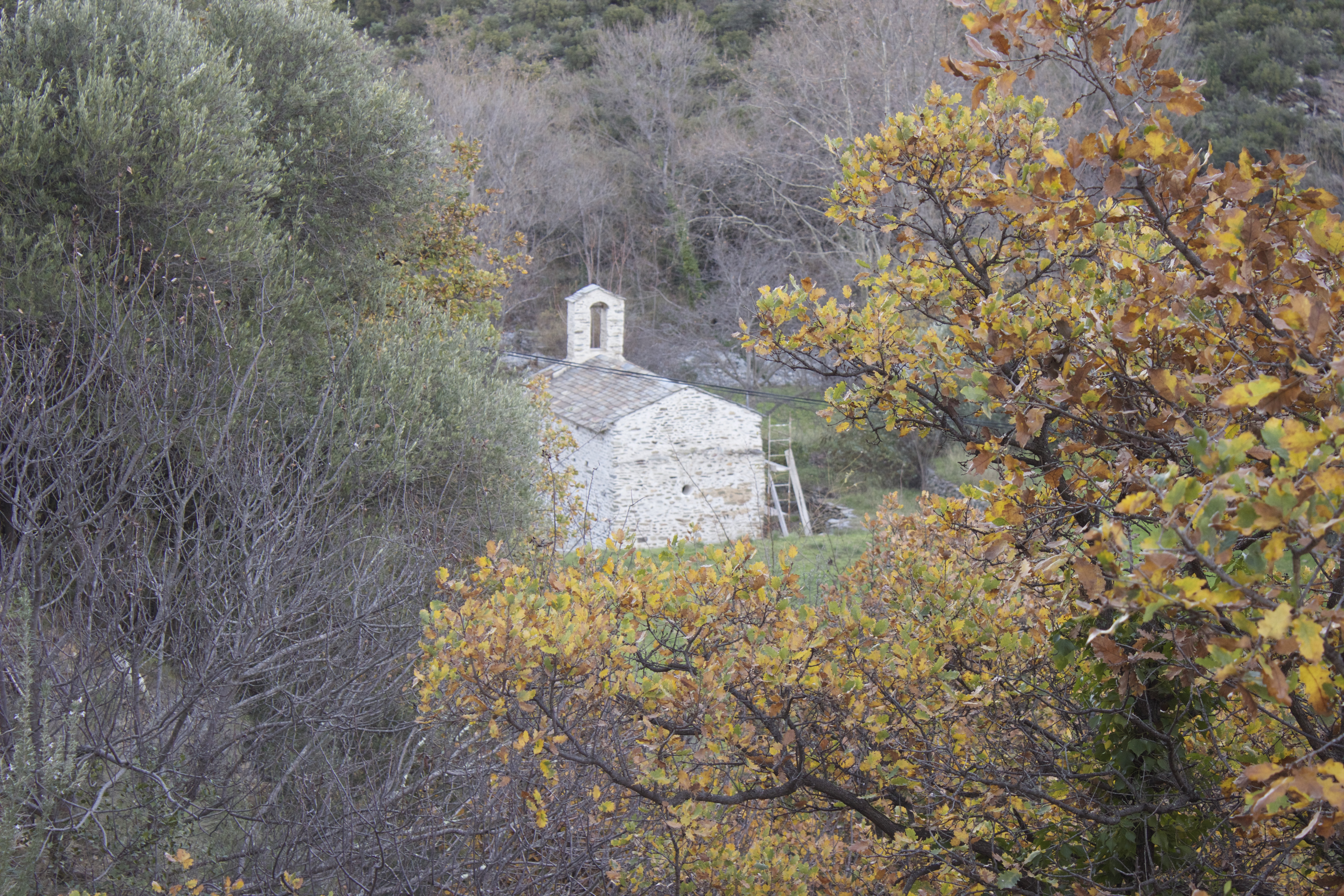
View of the chapel from the RD618.

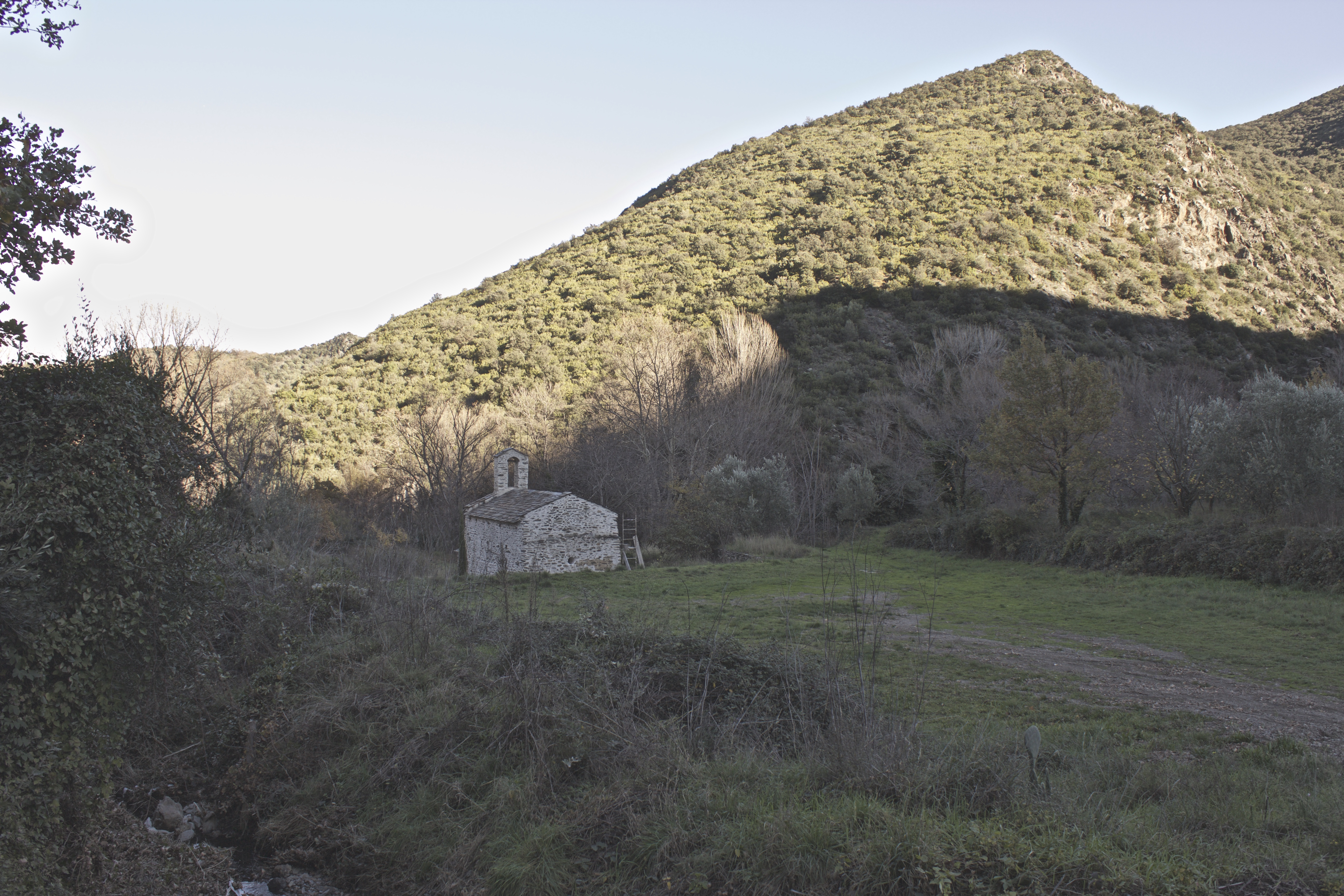
The chapel in its environment.

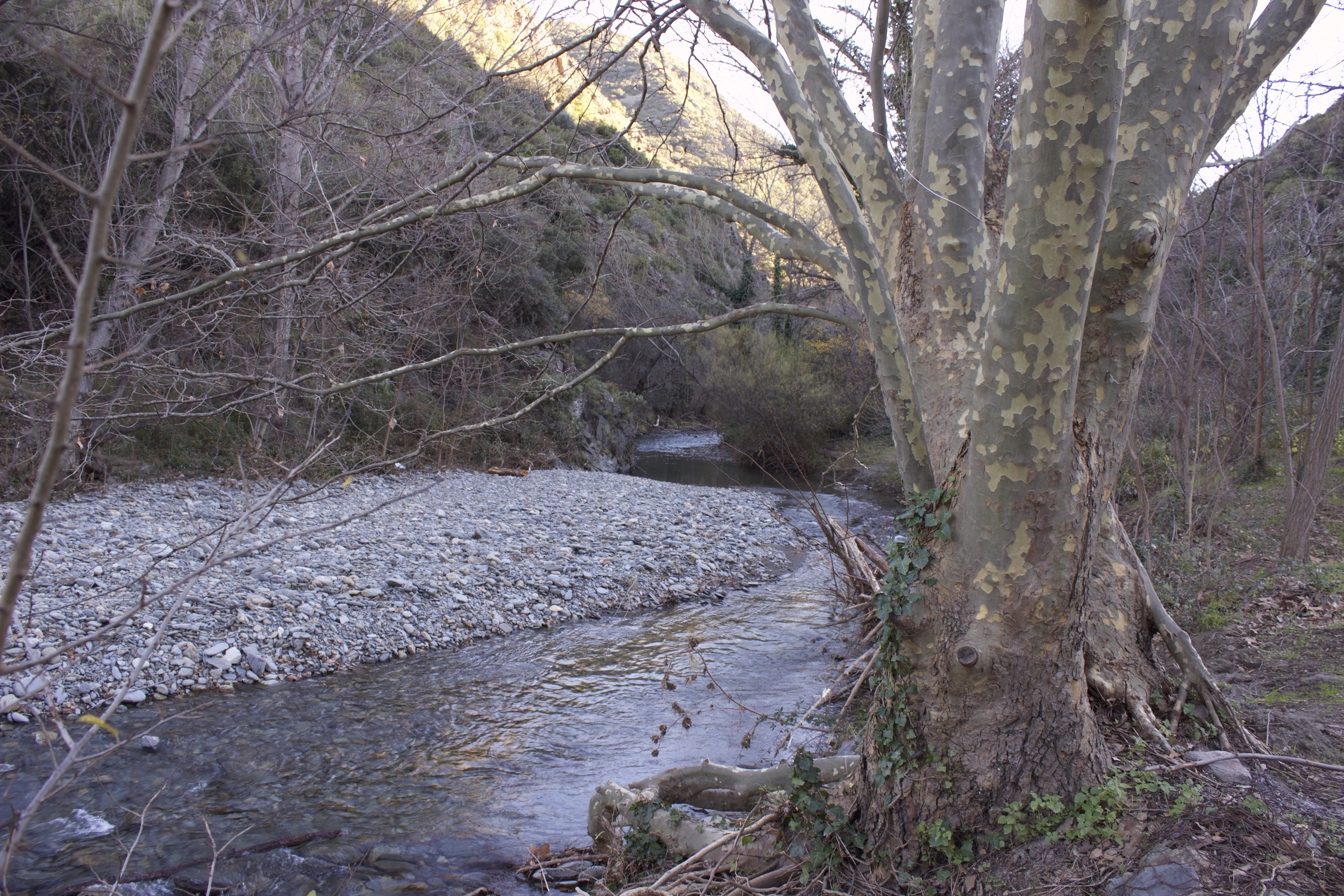
The Boulès behind the church.

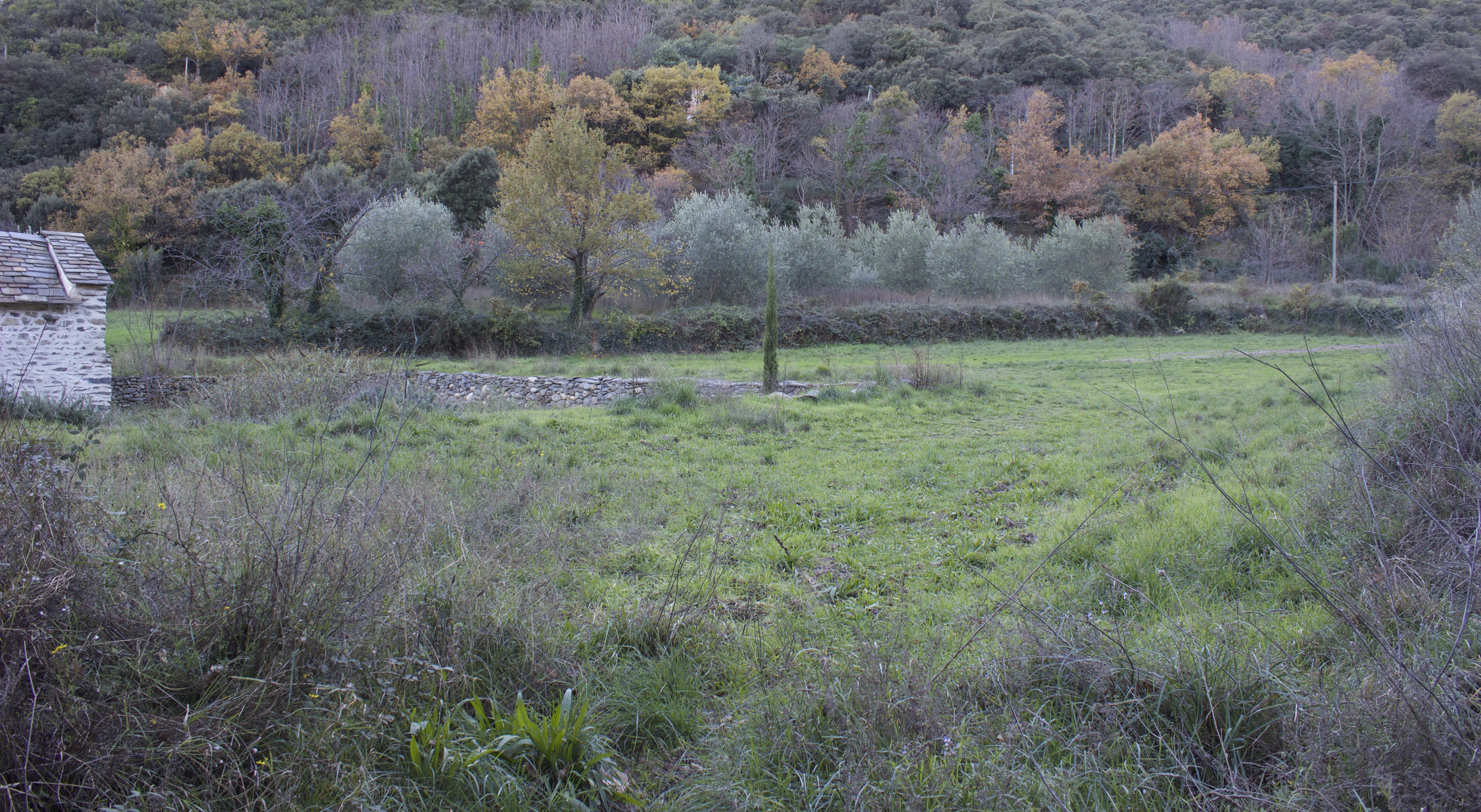
The land on which the church stands.

== Toponymy ==
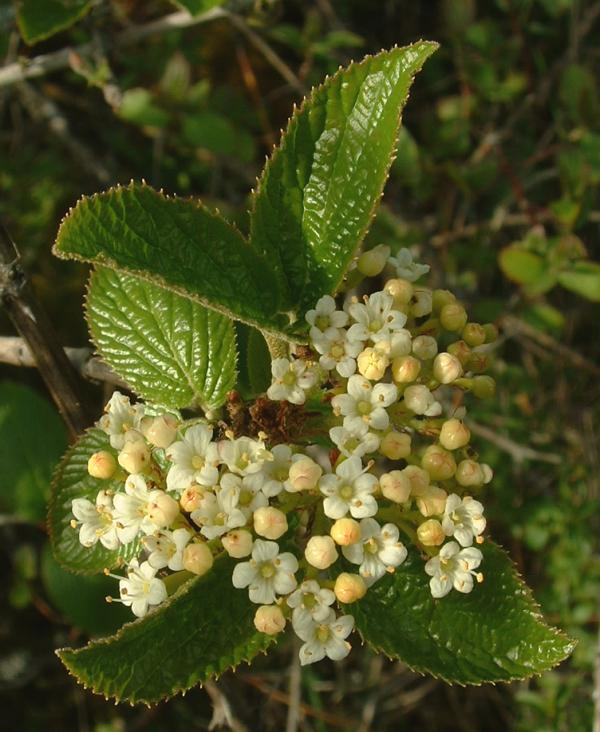
"Barbadell" (Viorne lantane) in bloom.

Barbadell is a Catalan name which, according to Lluís Basseda, derives from the Latin Barbatellus, a diminutive of Barbatus. Barbatus is undoubtedly the name of the owner of a villa, a medieval agricultural property located in this area. This name was later given to a village, now disappeared, and to the parish church of this village, which is now the church of Saint-Nazaire.

Other origins have been suggested: the Catalan name barbada, which can refer to sandy ground surrounded by rocks, or the Catalan adjective barbat, meaning a plant that has taken root. Jean Reynal also points out that barbadell is one of the Catalan names for Viorne lantane (Viburnum Lantana).

Quoi qu'il en soit, on retrouve une famille nommée Barbadell dans le village voisin de Glorianes et à Sofrunys (village maintenant intégré à la commune de Glorianes) dès le début du xiv^{e} siècle, dans deux actes, pour un mariage en 1319 et une vente de domaine agricole en 1342.

En catalan, le double l est mouillé.

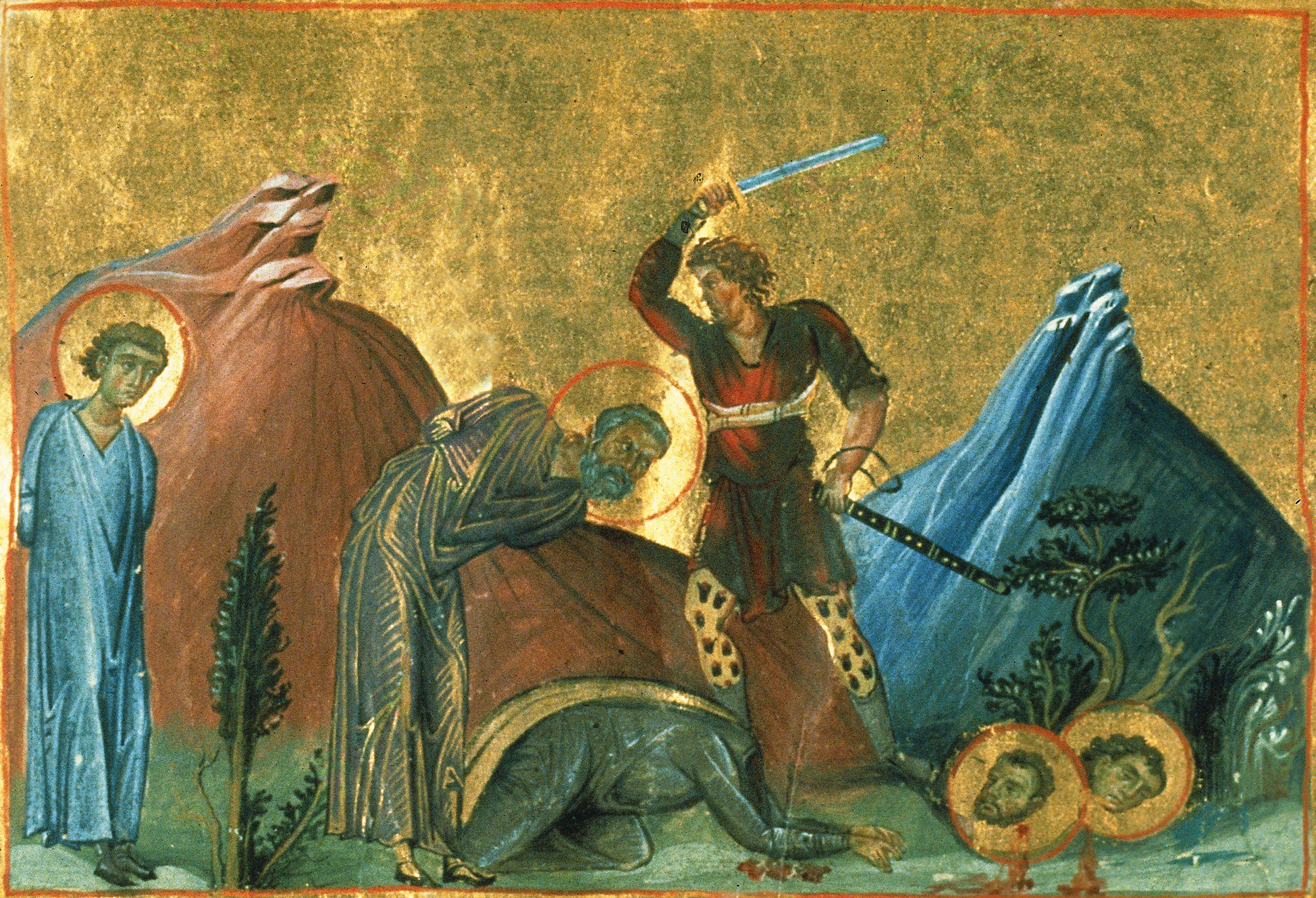
Decapitation of Nazarius and his companions Celsus, Protais and Gervais. Menologe of Basil II, late 10th - early 11th century, Vatican Apostolic Library.

Saint-Nazaire (Catalan: Sant Nazari) comes from a Hebrew nickname meaning "the Nazarene", a person from Nazareth, like Jesus Christ.

The church owes its name to Nazarius of Milan, a Roman Christian of the 1st century. He went to Gaul to preach the new religion, and was persecuted by the authorities for trying to spread his faith. According to Christian tradition, he was sentenced to drowning, from which he miraculously escaped, before ending up beheaded, along with his companions Celsus, Gervasius and Protasius, all of whom later became Catholic saints.

The building is referred to as "Chapelle St-Nazaire" or "Sant Nazari" on IGN maps.

== History ==
=== Construction and parish ===
Although the chapel's layout and some of its architectural features are typical of pre-Romanesque rural churches in Catalonia, i.e. from the ninth or tenth century, the date of construction is not known with certainty. Originally, the church was covered by a roof frame, which was replaced by a vault at an undated period, possibly the 11th century. The present wall-belfry may have been built at the same time as the vault.

Saint-Nazaire is first mentioned on October 25, 1151, in the act of consecration of the church of Sainte-Marie de Serrabone, of which it is a dependency, under the name "Ecclesia de Barbadello", with no mention of the church's dedication to any particular saint. Other churches mentioned in this text are those of Arsus, Villela, Joch and Marynians. This text is also the first known mention of the toponym Barbadell, already in its present form.

A text from 1265 refers to the church as a parish in the village of Barbadell ("parrochia Sancti Nazarii de Barbadello"). This is the first known mention of the church's dedication to Saint Nazaire.

From 1260, and for a century afterwards, a relatively large number of documents attest to the fact that Bouleternère residents bequeathed money in their wills to the priest in charge of the Barbadell church.

=== Depopulation ===
In 1346, Pope Clement VI issued a bull stating that the church of Saint-Nazaire de Barbadell had been left without care ("sine cura") and appointed a priest to look after it.

The parish church status seems to have been lost shortly afterwards: in 1358, Saint-Nazaire is named as a simple chapel, and in 1389 (or 1390), the church is an "Ecclesia ruralis" (rural church, located in the countryside).

The parish of Barbadell was never able to develop and remained an area of dispersed rural settlement, sparsely populated and therefore fragile. There are three reasons why it disappeared in the middle of the 14th century rather than at any other time. Firstly, flooding, which may have become more frequent during this period. Secondly, wars. The county of Roussillon was the object of wars between the kingdoms of Aragon and Majorca, particularly when, in 1344, the Aragonese king Peter the Ceremonious took Roussillon from James III of Majorca. In 1365, the future Constable of France Bertrand Du Guesclin sent the "grandes compagnies" (mercenaries who, in times of peace, plunder the regions they found themselves in) to take part in the Spanish wars. They passed through the Roussillon region, where they pillaged numerous villages, including the Serrabonne priory, which was partly destroyed. Finally, the plague, which reached Perpignan in 1348, claimed many victims in Roussillon as in the rest of Europe. Although no text mentions these ravages specifically in Barbadell, there is no doubt that the village suffered their consequences more or less directly.

Despite this, Saint-Nazaire continued to be a place of worship, receiving donations from Bouleternère villagers until at least 1413. The prior of Serrabonne is described as "capellano" (chaplain, priest officiating in a chapel) of Saint-Nazaire de Barbadell in a text from 1424. In 1529, a deed confirms Serrabonne's possession of Saint-Nazaire de Barbadell, which loses its priory status in 1592. In 1611, the churches of Serrabonne (now a parish) and Barbadell came under the authority of the bishopric of Solsona, located south of the Pyrenees. The distance from Barbadell to Solsona by modern road is over 160 km.

=== Time for hermits ===
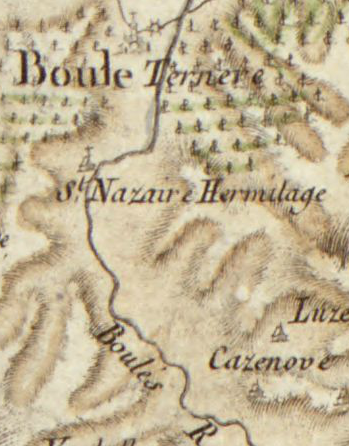
"St Nazaire Hermitage" on Cassini map Mont-Louis - Mousset, circa 1780

During the 17th century, the village of Barbadell was completely abandoned. The church of Saint-Nazaire was not forgotten by the inhabitants of Bouleternère, and became a hermitage.

The fate of Saint-Nazaire de Barbadell is shared by many isolated rural churches and former parish churches in deserted villages in the province of Roussillon. Victims of relative abandonment, they often became hermitages in the course of the 17th century. A work published in 1688 lists forty-four hermitages in the province, but Barbadell is not mentioned.

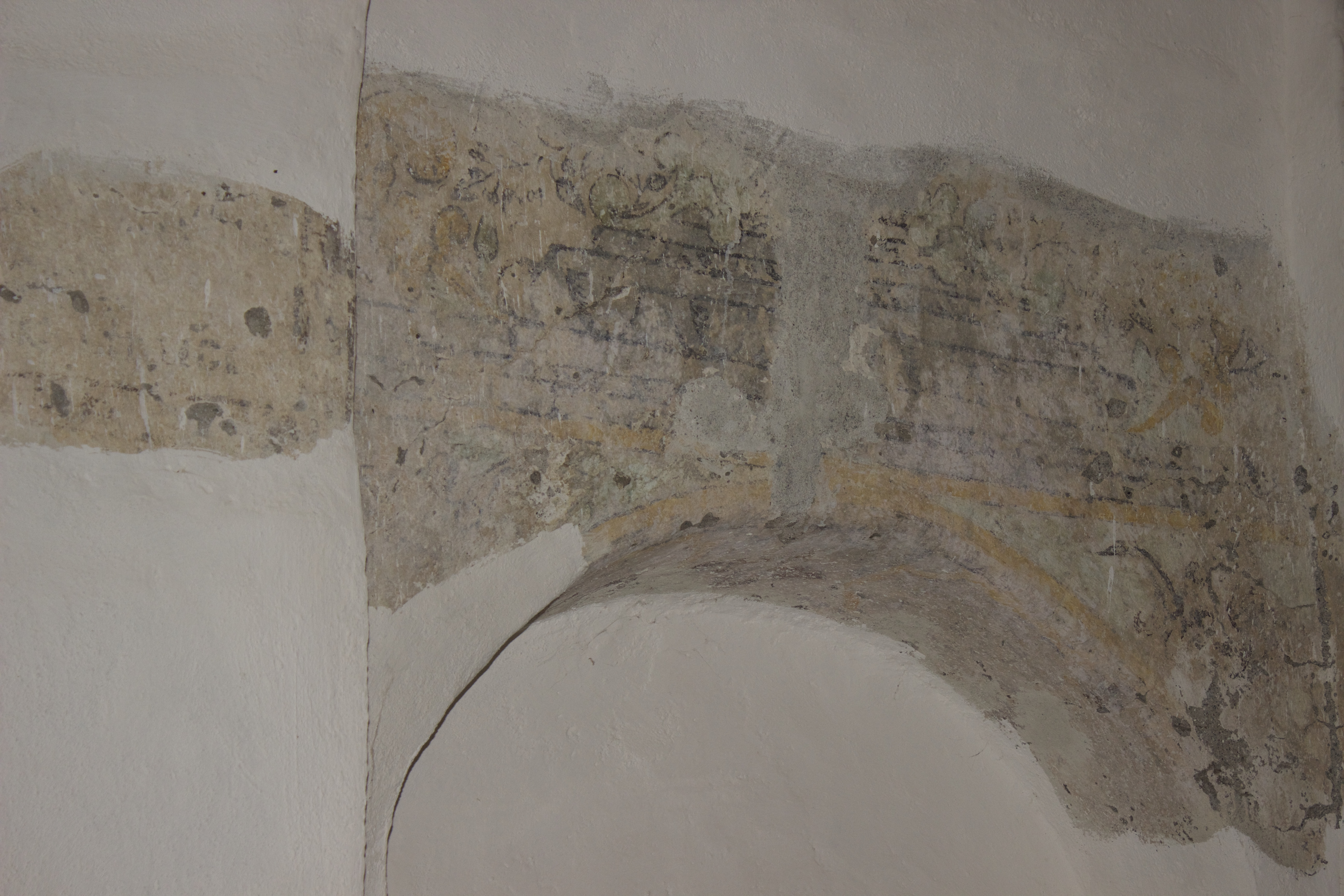
Saint-Nazaire arch with remains of 18th-century paintwork.

The first hermit attested at Saint-Nazaire de Barbadell, in 1734, was Pere Vaquer. He died on April 28, 1739 and is buried in the Barbadell chapel. Two other hermits are mentioned in texts: Isidore Bonacasa on August 8, 1753 and in 1756 (died October 19, 1779) and Joseph Escande in 1797.

The originality of the Barbadell hermitage lies in its location and relative comfort: hermitages in the Roussillon region are usually found in abandoned, uninhabited and drought-prone areas. Saint-Nazaire de Barbadell benefits from fertile soil and lies close to a stream in a valley sheltered from the Tramontane wind. Apart from this characteristic, the hermit of Barbadell leads the same life as his counterparts in Roussillon: he cultivates the land around the church to feed himself, attends religious services in Bouleternère, during which he sometimes helps the priest. In fine weather, he visits the inhabitants of Bouleternère and surrounding farms to collect money, reciting prayers he knows by heart (hermits are generally illiterate). He is also in charge of maintaining the chapel, near which he has a small lodging. The hermit organizes the aplec (traditional Catalan religious festival) for the feast of Saint Nazaire, on July 28.

Thus, despite the loss of its status as a parish seat and the desertification of its territory, the chapel of Saint-Nazaire de Barbadell lives on. Religious services are still held there on July 28, the chapel is regularly maintained and, around 1760, the interior was repainted, with decorations painted using the tempera technique.

During the French Revolution, the decree of November 2, 1789 on clergy property at the disposal of the Nation stipulated that Church property was to be sold, with the profits used to pay off the State's debts. In Roussillon, which became the department of Pyrénées-Orientales, the measure was delayed. On May 17, 1792, it was decided that "the management of the department would decide that the hermitage churches would be evacuated and closed, and that all objects that could be used to make money would be taken to the Perpignan mint and the others to the depot". On this occasion, the bell of Saint-Nazaire and the liturgical furnishings it contained were confiscated, then disappeared. Many hermitages became farm buildings. Saint-Nazaire de Barbadell temporarily escaped this fate.

In 1797, the hermitage was bought by Joseph Escande for 450 francs. According to Roland Serres-Bria, he may have been a former Bouleternère priest, born in the village in 1731. He seems to have settled as a hermit in Barbadell, shortly before his death.

=== Forfeiture ===
The decline of Saint-Nazaire de Barbadell church accelerated with the death of Joseph Escande. Marie Angélique Escande (probably his sister) inherited his property, including the chapel; she died in 1803. She had many heirs, including her nephews. The chapel and adjoining land went to Bazelice Lloses, who sold it (340 francs) to a farmer who owned adjoining land. In 1811, he exchanged it with Jacques Glori, who divided the lot between his three children.

The 1811 deed of exchange already mentions "the hermitage of Saint-Nazaire, now very dilapidated and in very poor condition".

The former hermitage is mentioned in the cadastre of 1832 as a "barn", crossed out and corrected by "house". It shows that, against the nave, to the south, two extensions were built perpendicular to the church, the three buildings forming a courtyard.

After 1832, the chapel was extensively remodeled for residential use: the triumphal arch was walled up, the building was raised (with the belfry opening serving as an upstairs window) and fitted with a floor separating it into two levels, the vault pierced with a chimney, the walls with two windows. A staircase is attached to the south facade to allow access to the upper floor. The wall above the triumphal arch is pierced by a door leading to a room built above the apse. The west wall was also modified: a window, a sink and a bread oven were added. All this work further degraded the old building.

At the end of the 20th century, the chapel lay in ruins, buried under modern additions and divided into three different properties.

=== Protection ===
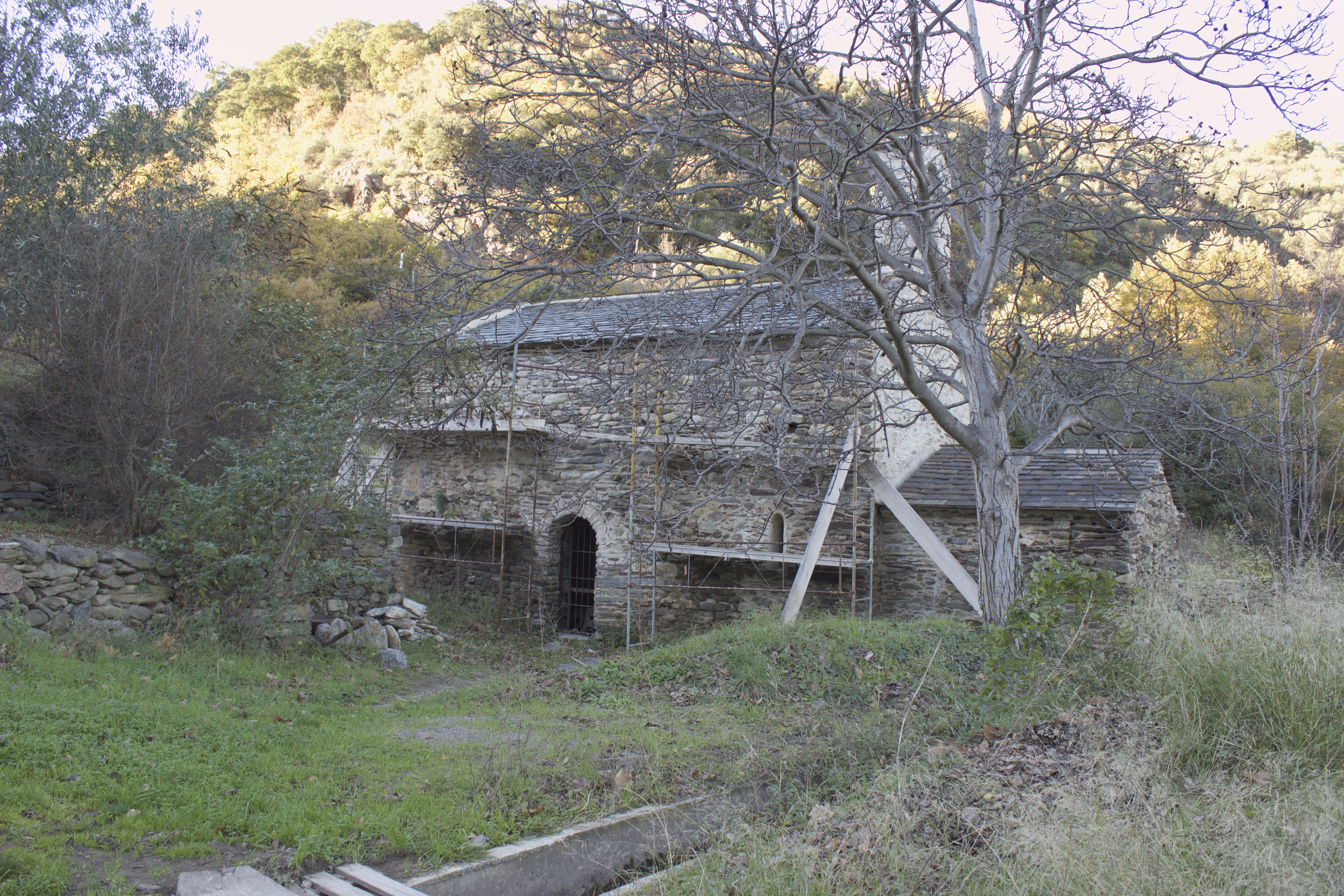
Winter 2014: scaffolding obscures the chapel's south façade.

Gradually, over the course of the 19th and 20th centuries, with the rural exodus and the decline in the number of practicing Catholics, many isolated churches in the Pyrénées-Orientales department became disused, abandoned and sometimes fell into ruin. Awareness of the need to safeguard this architectural heritage began to grow, initially with emblematic abbeys such as Saint-Martin du Canigou (from 1902) and Saint-Michel de Cuxa (from the 1920s). From the 1980s onwards, the process accelerated with the creation of a number of associations dedicated to the renovation of these ancient buildings.

For Sant Nazari de Barbadell, the process began in 1997. On April 28 of that year, a conservation association, Els amics de Sant Nazari de Barbadell, was created by the three owners of the building. The owners, who owned the site jointly, agreed to donate it to the association so that it could embark on a complete restoration. The donation was formalized in December 1997. The notarial deed mentions that, should the association be dissolved, the church would become the property of the commune of Bouleternère.

Work began in October 1997. Members of the association met once a month on Sundays, assisted by other volunteers from the region. First, the site had to be cleared of undergrowth, the church freed of 19th-century additions, and the walls consolidated. The church is once again visible. On May 1, 1998, a celebration was held to show the public the first results of the renovation. The association began looking for grants and subsidies to repair the roof.

In the years that followed, the work continued: the floor and additions were removed, and the roof was re-roofed in lauzes by a specialized craftsman. The walls were also repointed. The church was freed from the ground into which it had gradually become embedded, and the openings were rebuilt to match the new ground level.

== Architecture ==
=== Church ===
The church of Saint-Nazaire in Barbadell is built according to the usual plan for pre-Romanesque churches in the region: the building is composed of a rectangular nave extended by a square apse whose axis is slightly offset from that of the nave. In the case of Barbadell, the offset apse faces south. The church is orientated, meaning that the choir and apse face east (orient). Another pre-Romanesque feature is the location of the door: in the south-facing wall.

The external dimensions of the building are approximately 5 m wide and 9 m long for the nave, and 4 m on each side for the apse.

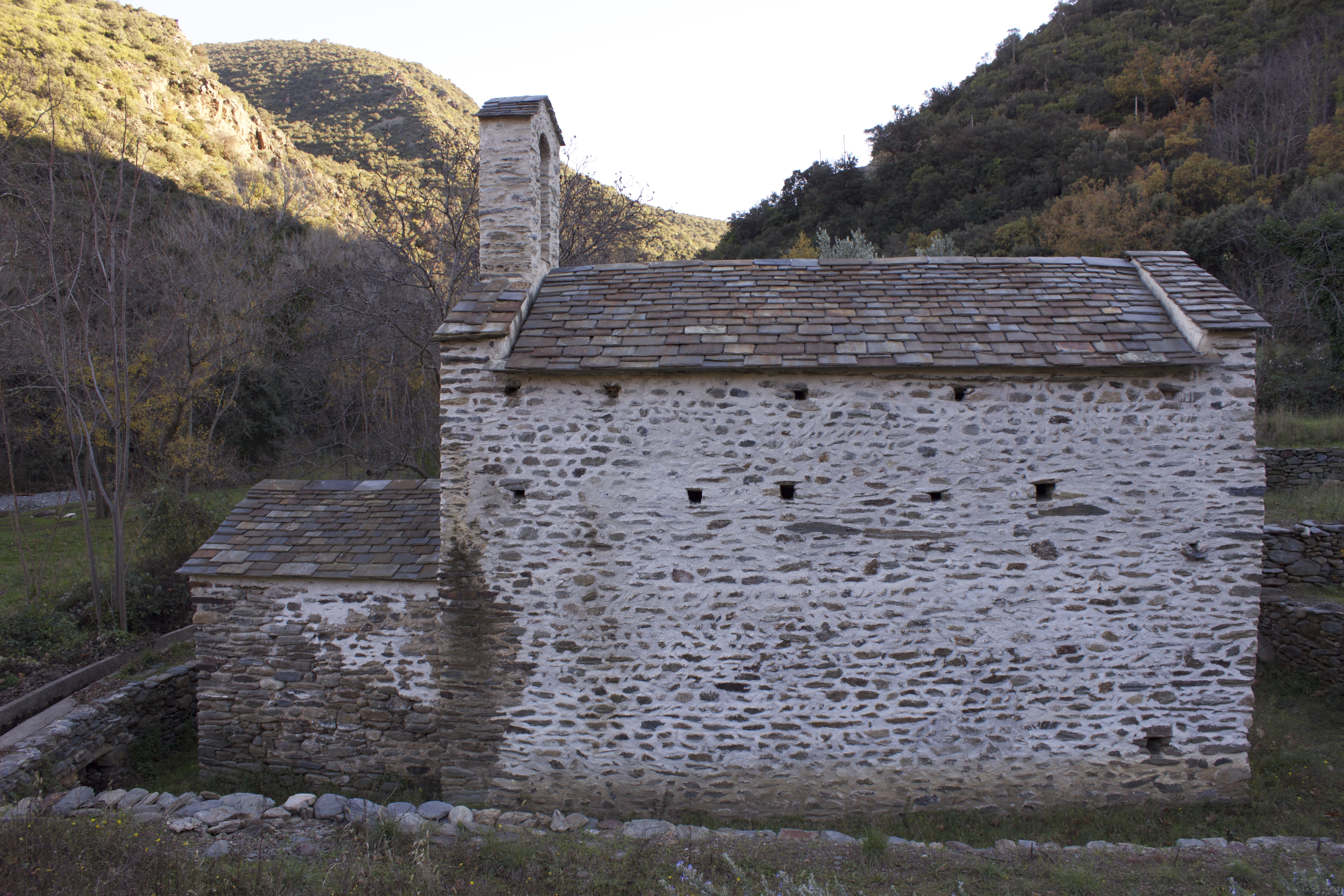
North facade.

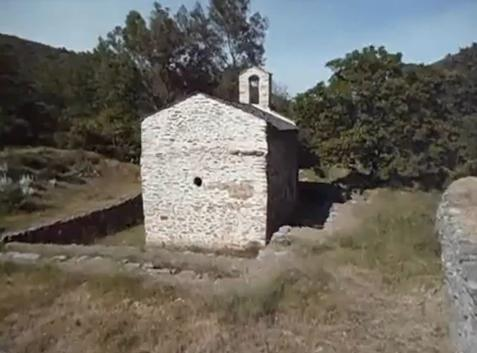
West façade.

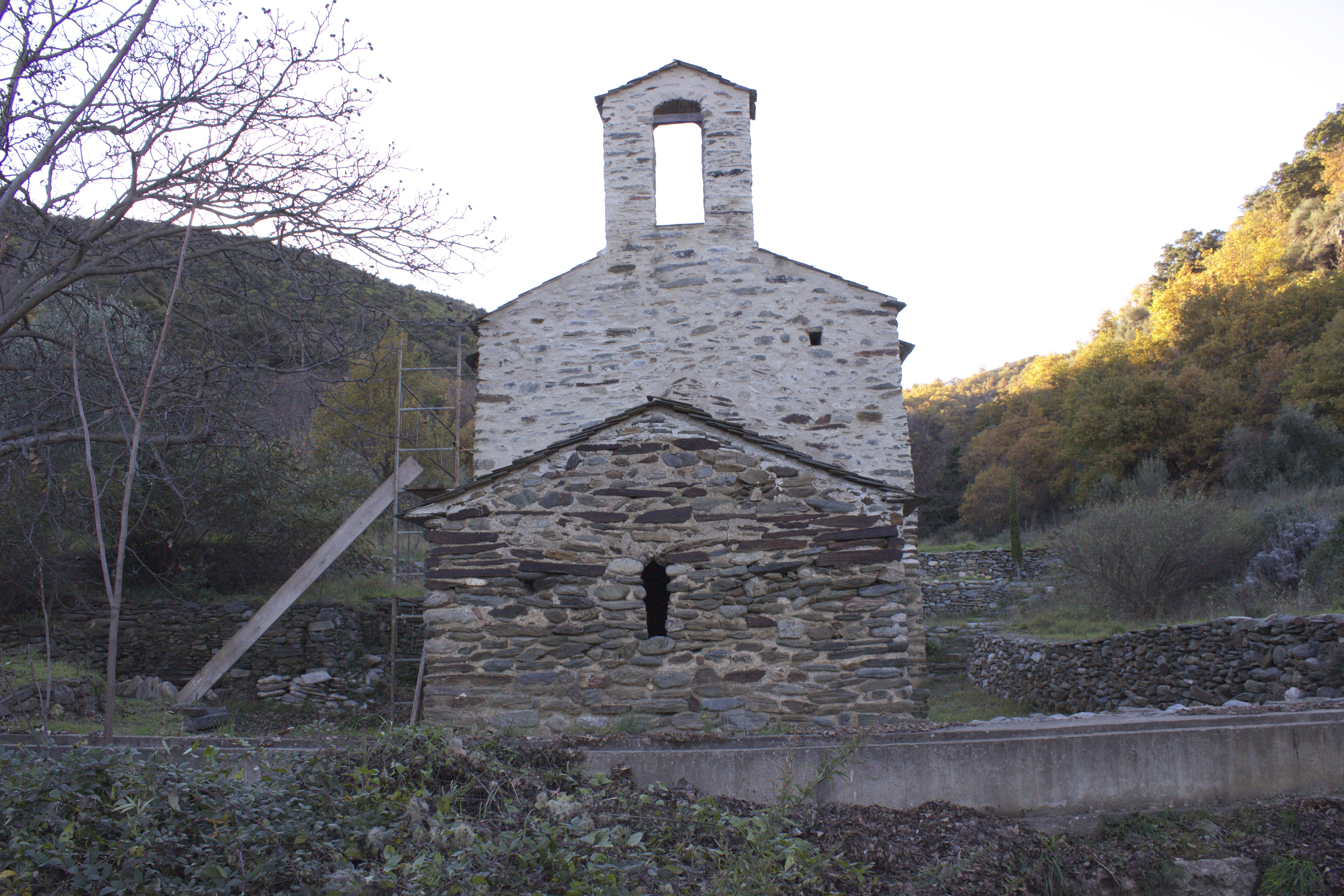
East facade, apse.

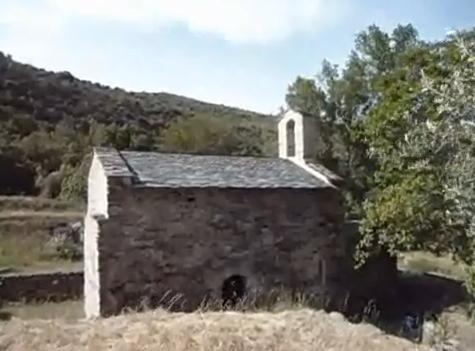
South facade, with entrance.

The nave is separated from the apse by a triumphal arch with narrow uprights, another characteristic of pre-Romanesque constructions, such as the church of the Abbey of Saint-Michel de Cuxa. The nave is barrel-vaulted, supported by double and formet arches. The stonework consists of hammer-squared rubble stones bonded with a large quantity of mortar. Some wall sections are in opus spicatum. At the point where the nave and apse are separated, the church is topped by a bell tower.

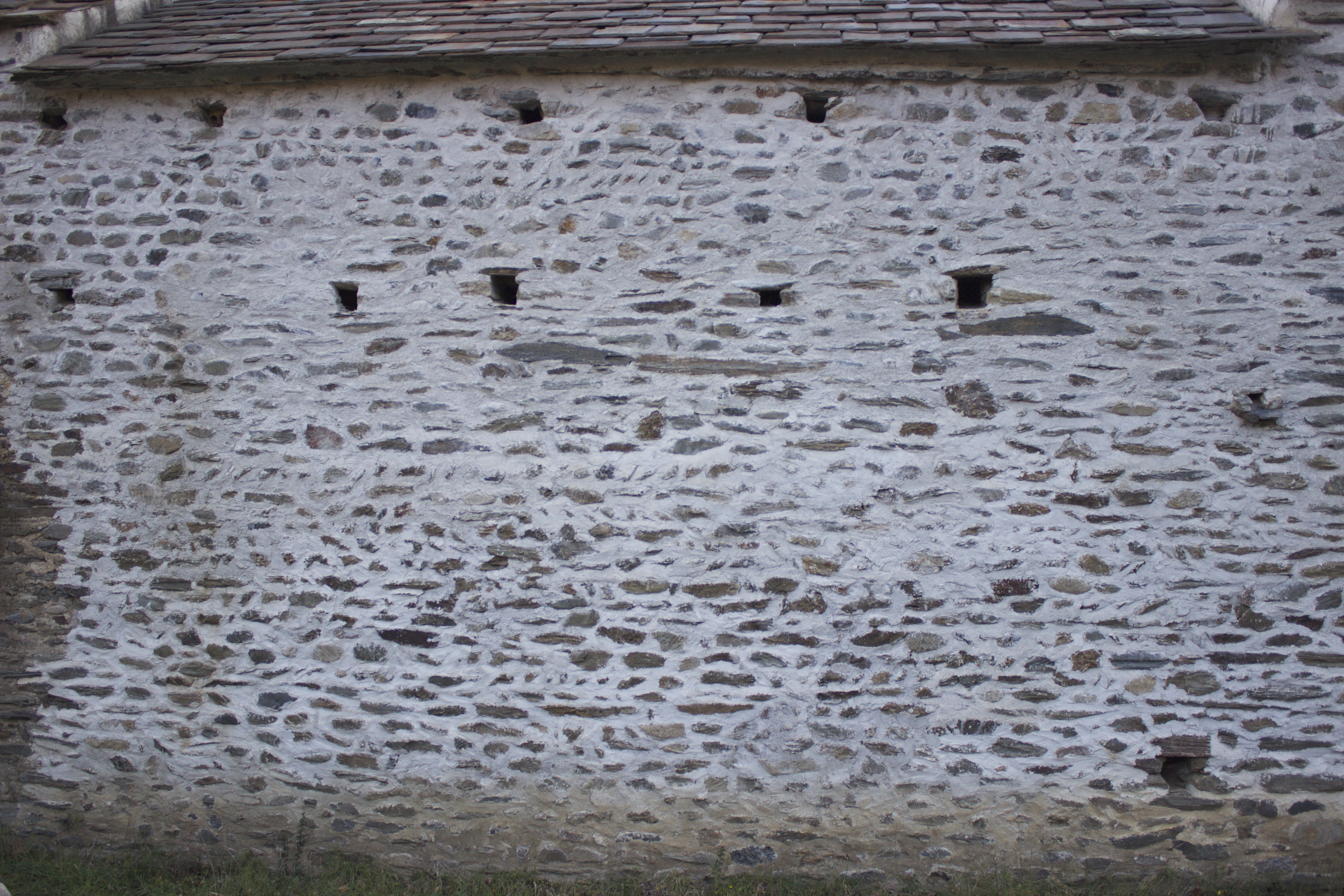
Masonry on the north façade.

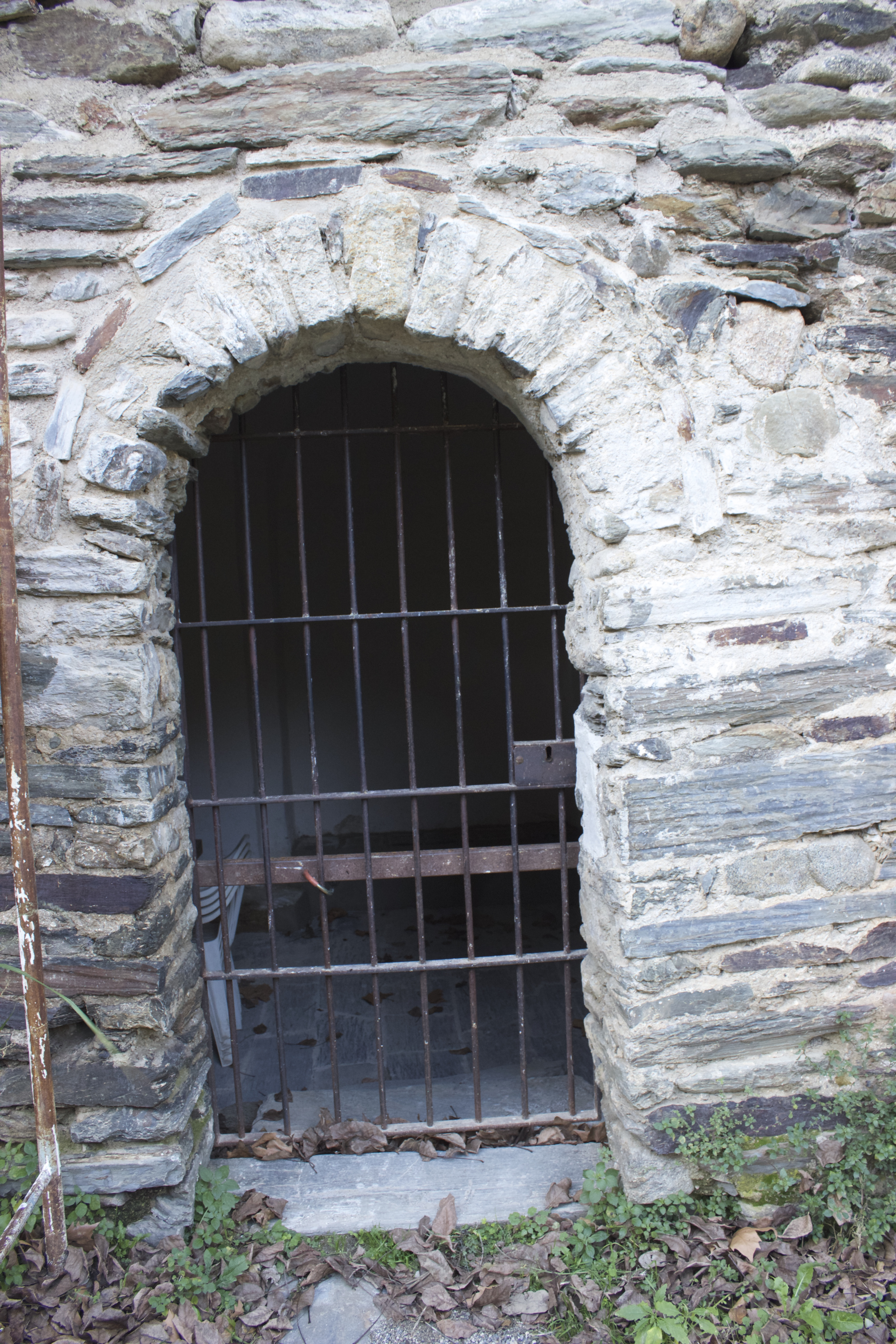
The portal.

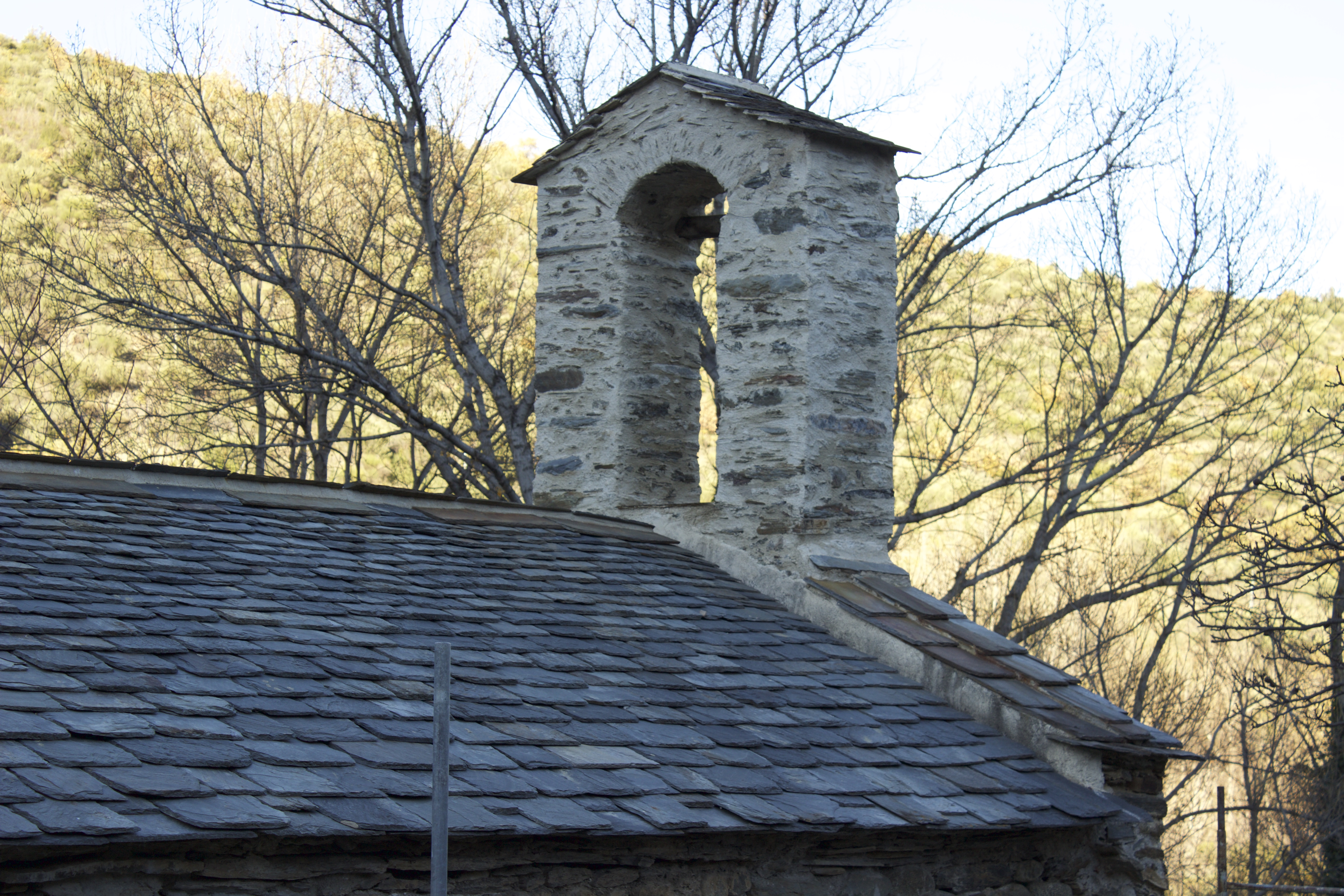
Renovated roof and bell tower.

Inside, part of the 18th-century painting remains on the north wall, near the triumphal arch. The letters LONG (beginning of the name of Longinus the Centurion, the Roman soldier who pierced Christ's side on the cross), as well as a floral decoration accompanied on either side by stylized scrolls, can be seen on this painting.

The whole structure is covered by a roof of lauzes.

=== Hydraulic installations ===
As the chapel is located in a flood zone on an alluvial fan formed by the Saint-Nazaire ravine, protection work was carried out in ancient times. Upstream, towards the ravine, several low walls perpendicular to the current were undoubtedly designed to break its force during floods. A slate canal with a diamond-shaped cross-section connects the bed of the ravine to that of the Boulès, passing close to the chapel. This channel is lined by a dike on the church side, showing that it is insufficient in size for high floods. Archaeological excavations have revealed that the foundations of the church sink 2.30 m into the ground, showing that the soil was raised by alluvial deposits during floods after the construction of the chapel, and that the latter was undoubtedly reworked to adapt it to the new ground level. Another canal, this time for irrigation, runs alongside the church on the Boulès side. The church is surrounded by low walls forming terraces with two functions: the terraces were intended to serve as agricultural land, and the low walls provided additional protection against flooding.

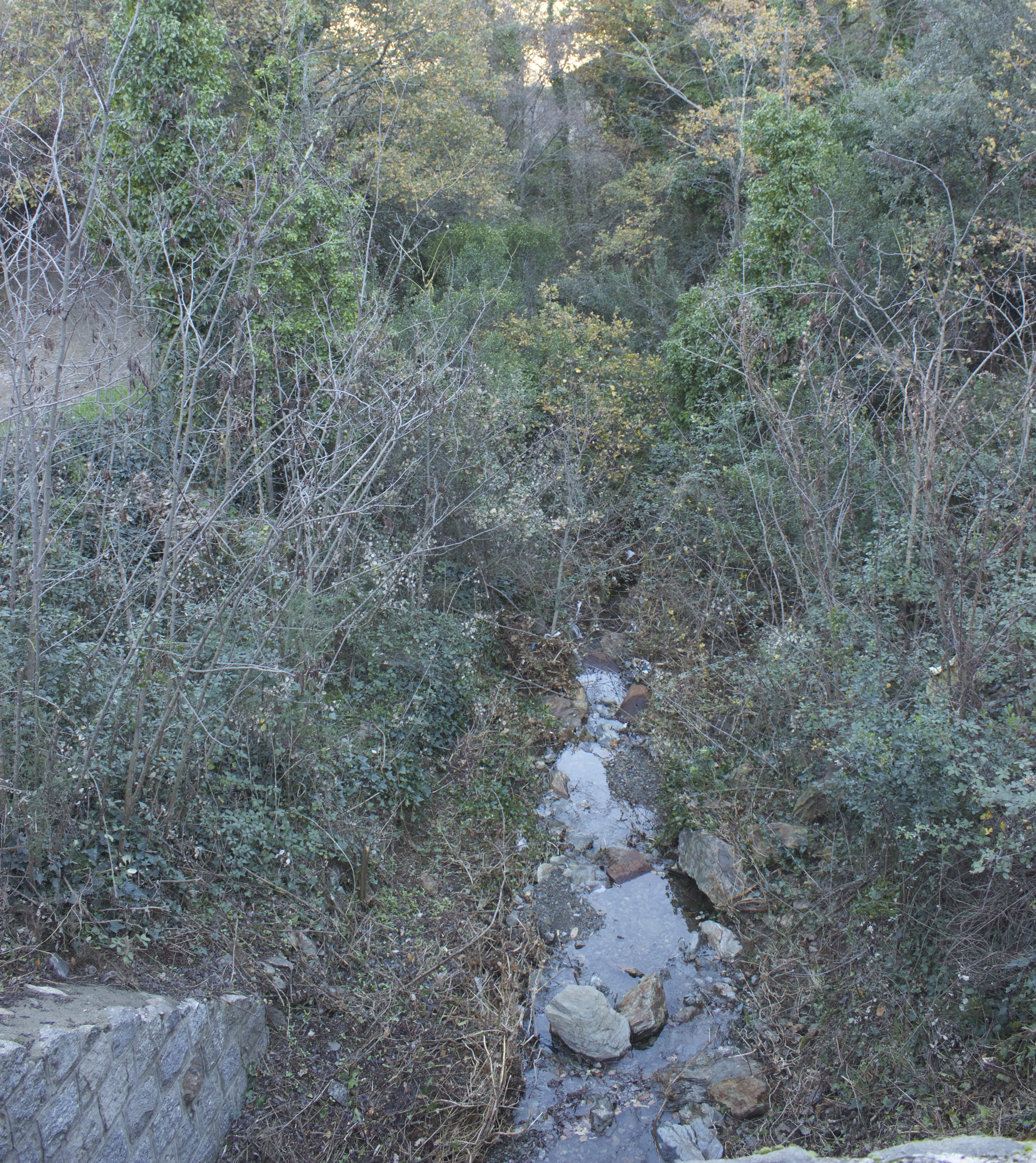
The Saint-Nazaire ravine.

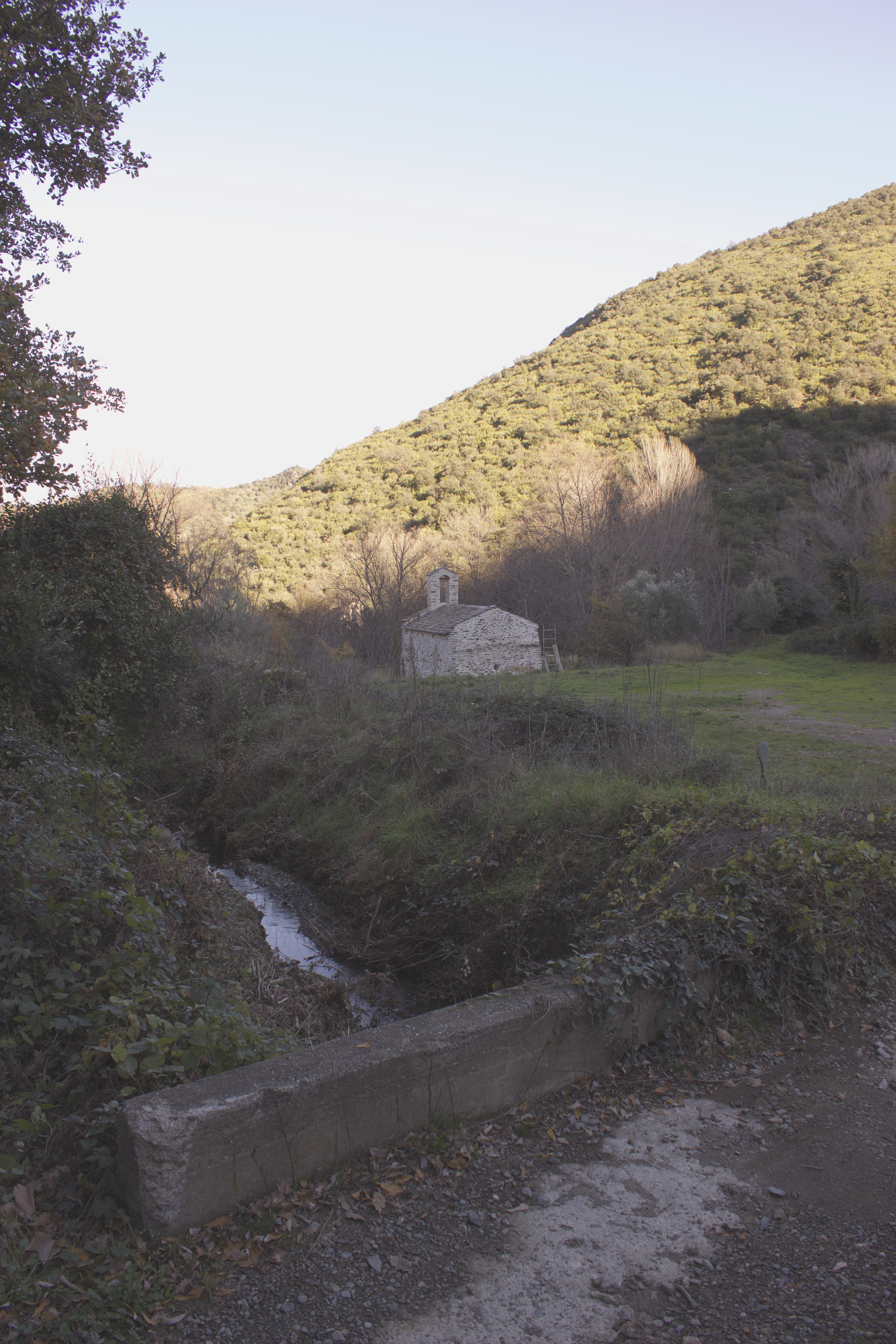
Stream and church of Saint-Nazaire.

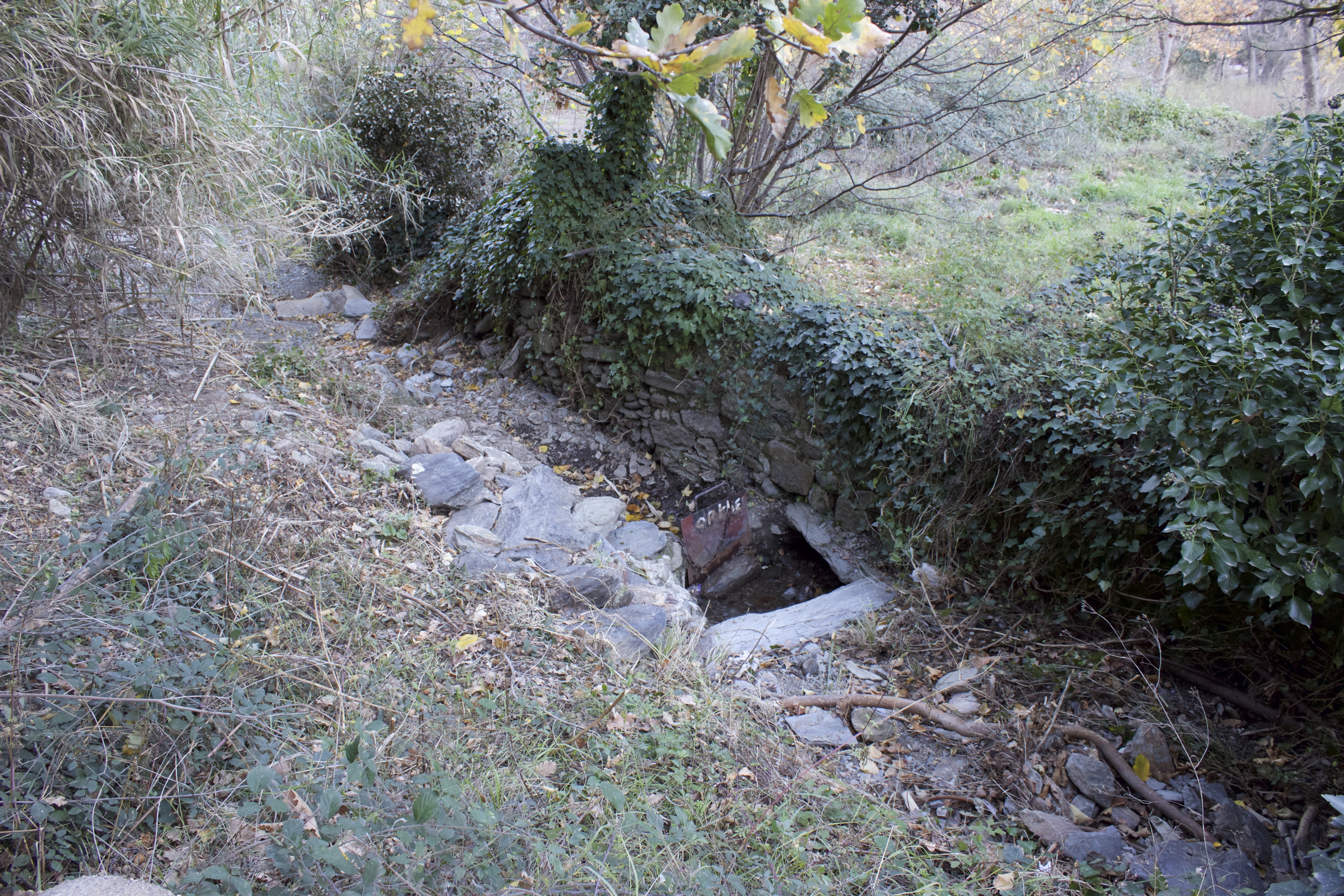
Canal doubling the Saint-Nazaire stream.

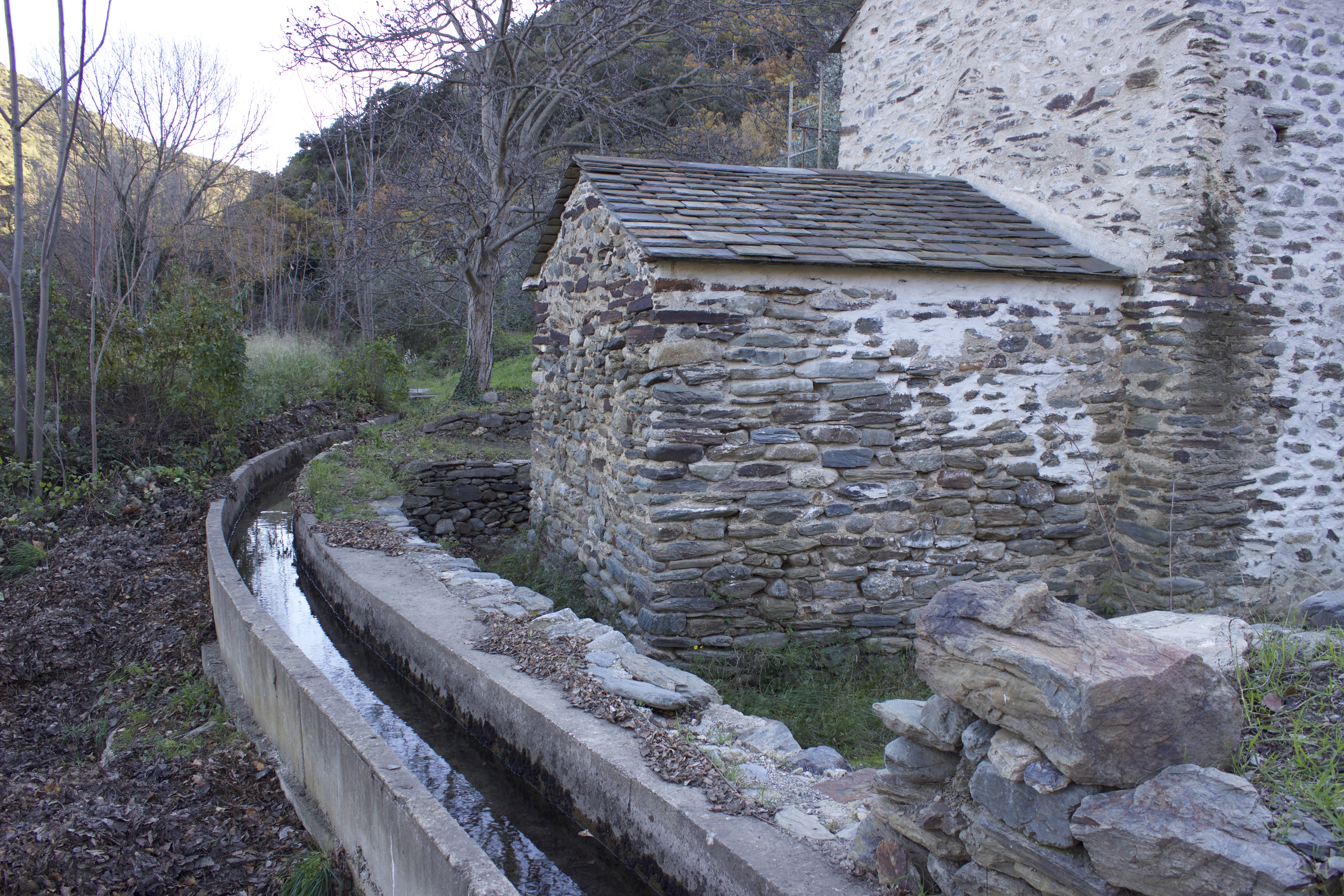
Canal running alongside the apse.

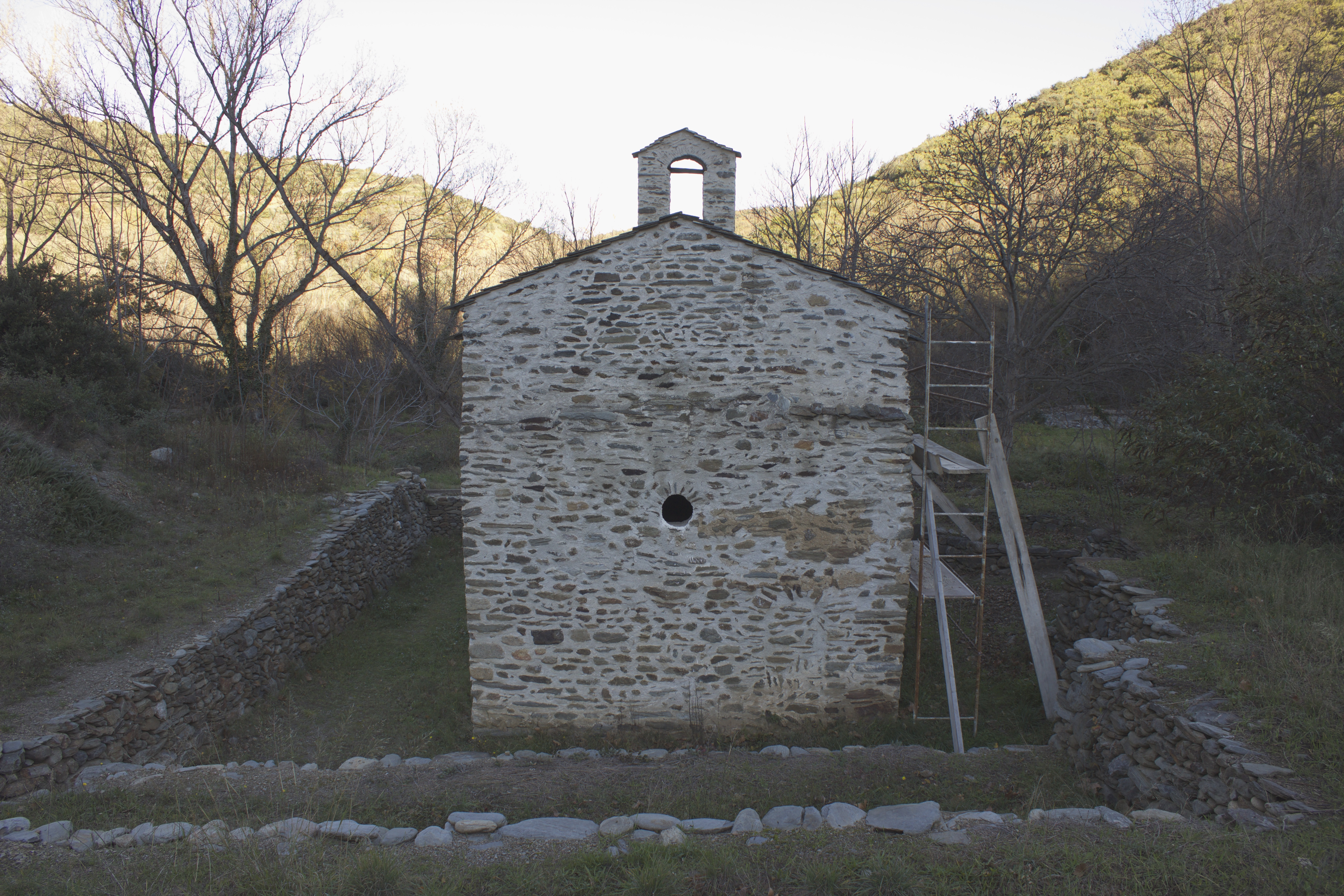
The church surrounded by low walls.

== Bibliography ==
- Basseda, Lluís (1990). "Toponymie historique de Catalunya Nord". Revista Terra Nostra. Prades.
- Carozza, Jean-Michel; Odiot, Thierry; Valette, Philippe; Puig, Carole; Pequinot, Claire; Alessandri, Patrice; Passarius, Olivier (2009). "Réponse des bassins versants du Roussillon entre le xiie et le xixe siècle : un impact du Petit Âge Glaciaire ?". Archéologie du Midi médiéval. 27 (27): 207–215. doi:10.3406/amime.2009.1898.
- Mallet, Géraldine (2003). Églises romanes oubliées du Roussillon. Montpellier: Les Presses du Languedoc. ISBN 978-2-8599-8244-7.
- Noëll, Francis (2005). "Une restauration particulière : l'église de Sant Nazari de Barbadell à Bouleternère". Cahiers des Amis du Vieil Ille et des villages voisins (168): 13–18.
- Noëll, Francis. La restauration de Sant Nazari de Barbadell un exemple de sauvegarde du patrimoine.
- Serres-Bria, Roland (2001). "Localités disparues du bassin du Bulès : Barbadell, Ministrol, Arsos". Société agricole, scientifique et littéraire des Pyrénées-Orientales. 108.
- Serres-Bria, Roland (2003). "Les Ermitages du Roussillon et leurs ermites". Société agricole, scientifique et littéraire des Pyrénées-Orientales. CX.
- Vivier, Julie; Lapique, Sylvain (2011). Guide des Pyrénées romanes. Toulouse: Éditions Privat. ISBN 978-2-7089-6902-5.
- Teisseire-Dufour, Patrice (1998). La renaissance de Sant Nazari de Barbadell : une association au secours d'une chapelle.

== See also ==
Serrabone Priory

Bouleternère
