= Boule-d'Amont =

Boule-d'Amont Bula d'Amunt
- Commune
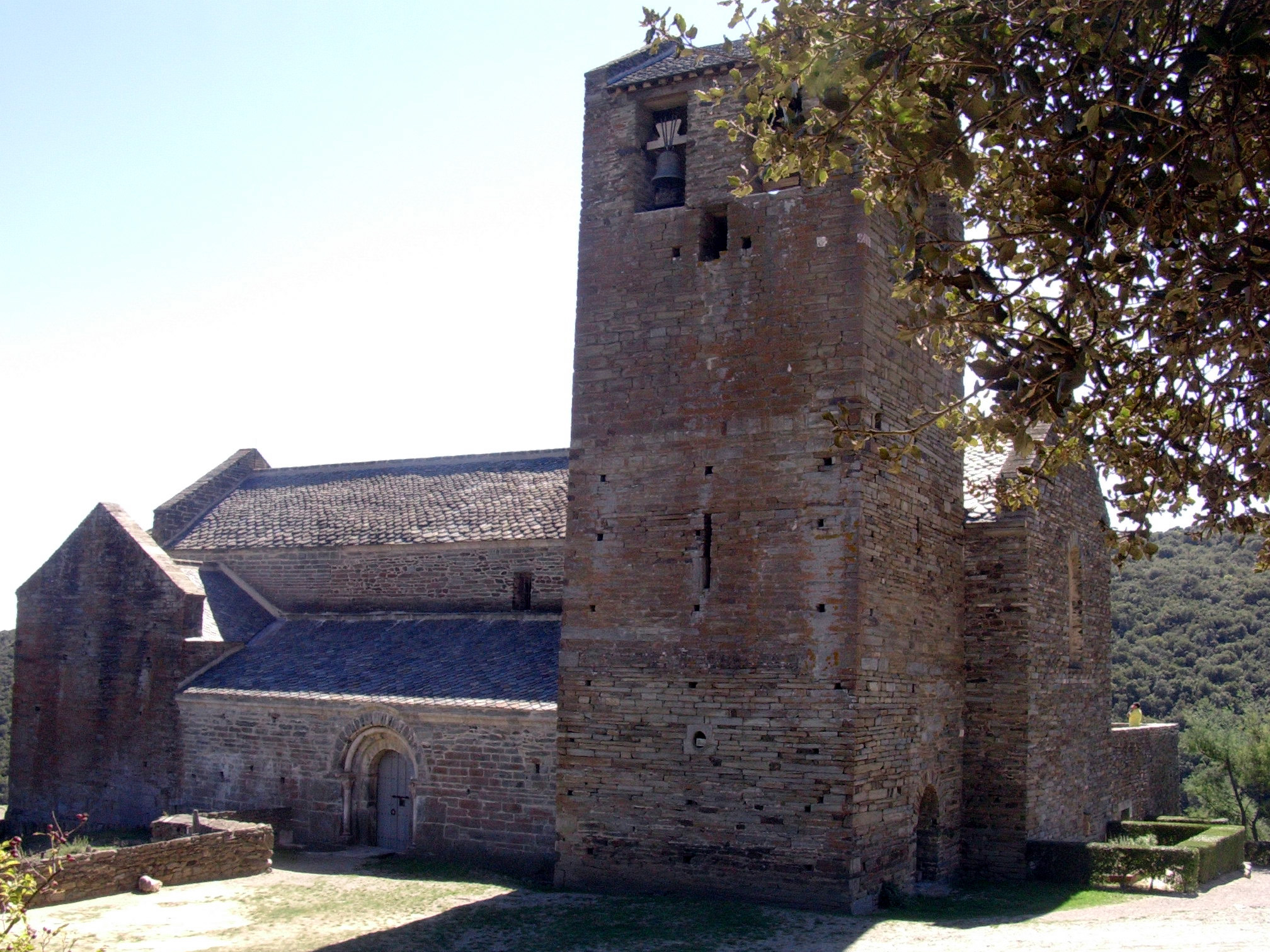
- The Serrabone Priory and church
- Location of Boule-d'Amont
- Location within France Location within Occitanie
- Coordinates: 42°34′50″N 2°36′51″E
- Country: France
- Region: Occitania
- Department: Pyrénées-Orientales
- Arrondissement: Prades
- Canton: Le Canigou
- Intercommunality: Roussillon Conflent

Government
  - Mayor (2020–2026): Claudine Botebol
- Area^{1}: 23.22 km^{2} (8.97 sq mi)
- Elevation: 483 m (1,585 ft)
- Highest elevation: 1,348 m (4,423 ft)
- Lowest elevation: 234 m (768 ft)
- Population (2023): 63
  - Density: 2.7/km^{2} (7.0/sq mi)
- Time zone: UTC+01:00 (CET)
  - Summer (DST): UTC+02:00 (CEST)
- INSEE/Postal code: 66022 /66130
- ^{1} French Land Register data, which excludes lakes, ponds, glaciers > 1 km^{2} (0.386 sq mi or 247 acres) and river estuaries.

Boule-d'Amont (French pronunciation: [bul damɔ̃]; Catalan: Bula d'Amunt) is a commune in the Pyrénées-Orientales department in southern France.

== Geography ==
=== Localisation ===
Boule-d'Amont is located in the canton of Le Canigou and in the arrondissement of Prades.

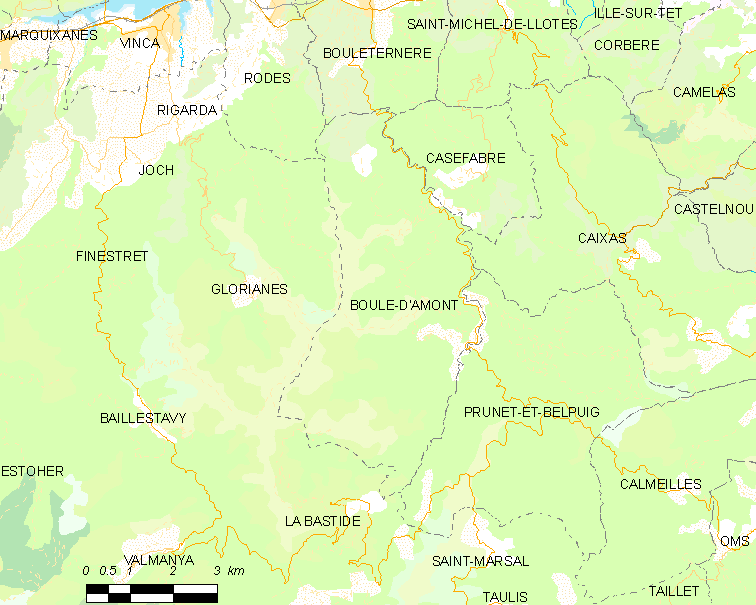
Map of Boule-d'Amont and its surrounding communes

== Government and politics ==
List of mayors
| Mayor | Term start | Term end |
|---|---|---|
| Fulcran Mazollier | 1977 | 1983 |
| Gérard Llense | 1983 | 2014 |
| Yann Oheix | 2014 | 2020 |
| Claudine Botebol | 2020 | incumbent |

== Population ==
Historical population
| Year | Pop. | ±% p.a. |
|---|---|---|
| 1968 | 69 | — |
| 1975 | 47 | −5.34% |
| 1982 | 70 | +5.86% |
| 1990 | 71 | +0.18% |
| 1999 | 73 | +0.31% |
| 2007 | 55 | −3.48% |
| 2012 | 65 | +3.40% |
| 2017 | 55 | −3.29% |
| 2023 | 63 | +2.29% |
Source: INSEE

== See also ==
- Communes of the Pyrénées-Orientales department
