= Bouleternère =

Bouleternère Bulaternera
- Commune
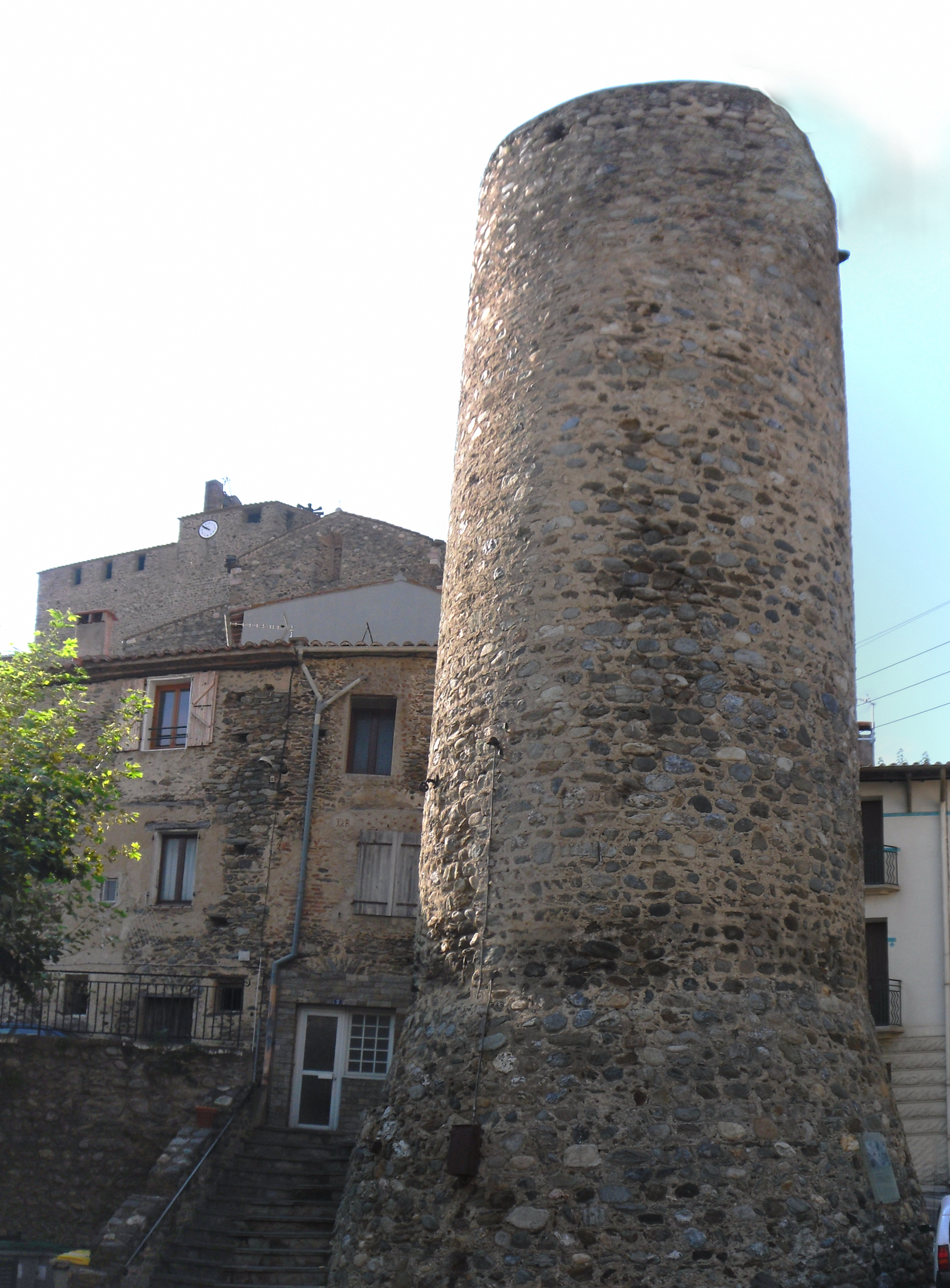
- The round tower in Bouleternère

- Coat of arms
- Location of Bouleternère
- Location within France Location within Occitanie
- Coordinates: 42°39′02″N 2°35′14″E
- Country: France
- Region: Occitania
- Department: Pyrénées-Orientales
- Arrondissement: Prades
- Canton: Le Canigou
- Intercommunality: Roussillon Conflent

Government
  - Mayor (2020–2026): Pascal Trafi
- Area^{1}: 10.63 km^{2} (4.10 sq mi)
- Elevation: 180 m (590 ft)
- Highest elevation: 612 m (2,008 ft)
- Lowest elevation: 160 m (520 ft)
- Population (2023): 951
  - Density: 89.5/km^{2} (232/sq mi)
- Time zone: UTC+01:00 (CET)
  - Summer (DST): UTC+02:00 (CEST)
- INSEE/Postal code: 66023 /66130
- ^{1} French Land Register data, which excludes lakes, ponds, glaciers > 1 km^{2} (0.386 sq mi or 247 acres) and river estuaries.

Bouleternère (French pronunciation: [bultɛʁnɛʁ]; Catalan: Bulaternera) is a commune in the Pyrénées-Orientales department in southern France.

== Geography ==
=== Localisation ===
Bouleternère is located in the canton of Le Canigou and in the arrondissement of Prades.

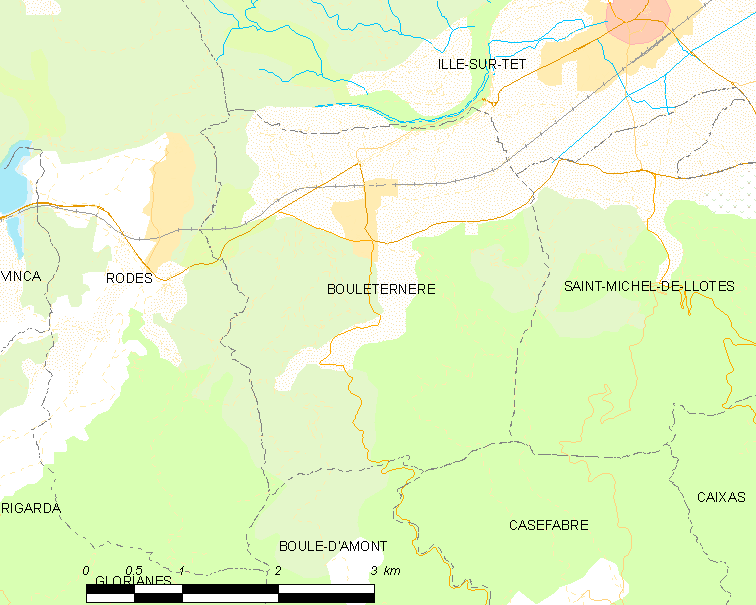
Map of Bouleternère and its surrounding communes

=== Hydrography ===
Bouleternère is crossed by the Boulès river, a tributary of the Têt.

== Government and politics ==
=== Mayors ===
Mayor	Term start	Term end
Isidore Pontich	1790	1792
Athanase Guiry	1792	1793
François Guimbert	1793	1795
Sulpice Taix	1795	1799
Athanase Guiry	1799	June 1815
Jean Marmer	June 1815	?
Athanase Guiry	?	1821
Joseph Mercure	1924	1924
André Paysa	1924	1927
François Sabardeil	1927	1941
François Baux	1941	1944
François Garrigue	1944	1952
Jules Gaspard	1952	1983
Jean Payrou	1983	2020
Pascal Trafi	2020	incumbent

== Population ==
Historical population
Year	Pop.	±% p.a.
1968	885	—
1975	739	−2.54%
1982	728	−0.21%
1990	625	−1.89%
1999	643	+0.32%
2007	777	+2.39%
2012	880	+2.52%
2017	935	+1.22%
2023	951	+0.28%
Source: INSEE

== Sites of interest ==
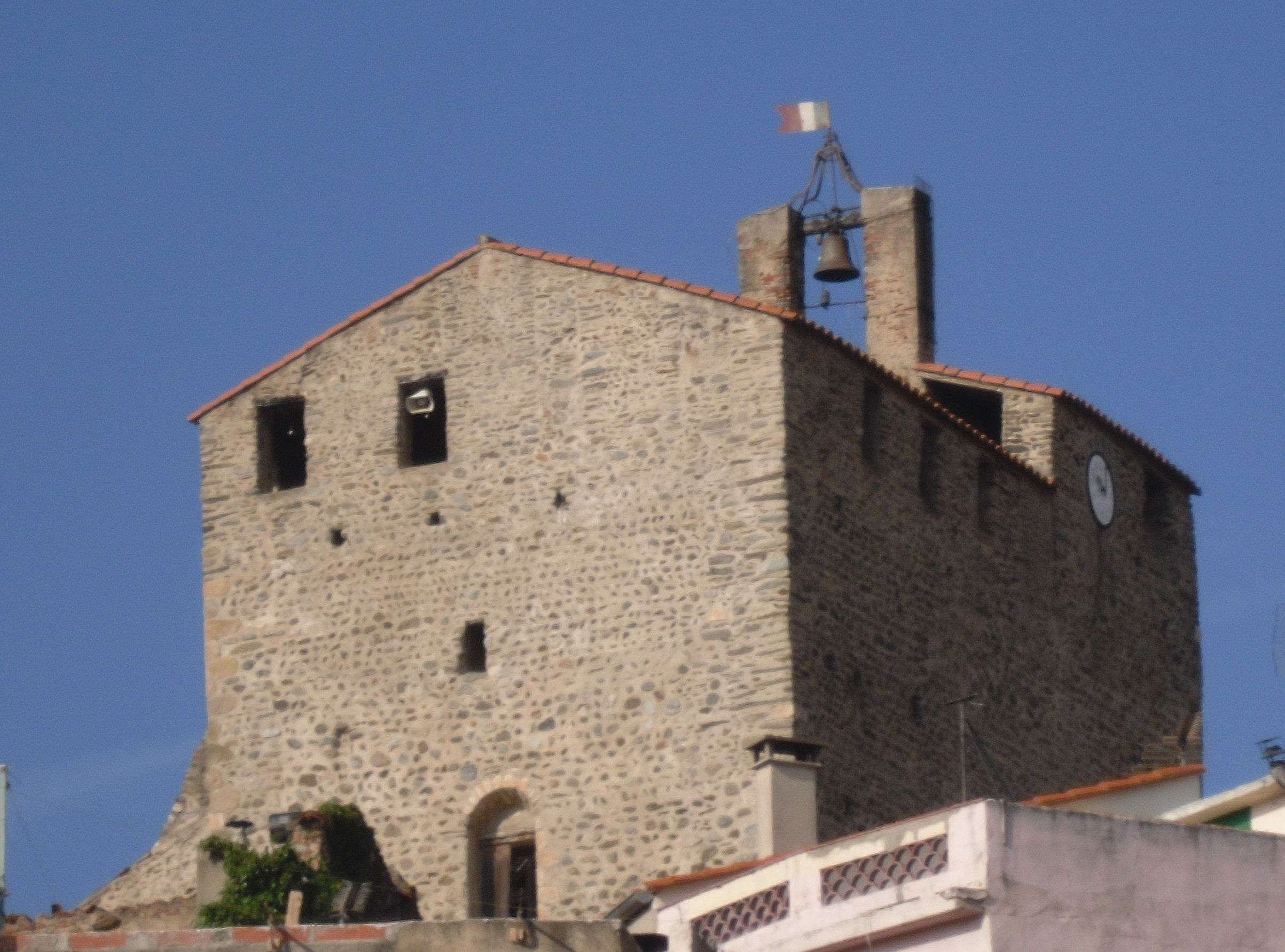
Saint-Sulpitius church

Part of the town's fortifications remain, and two of the four towers and three of the seven city doors are still in place.

The old Saint-Sulpitius church was built in the 11th century on the remains of an older church from the 9th century. A new Saint-Sulpitius church was built next to it and finished in 1659, while the old church became the presbytery. Both were hit by lightning in June 1891 and suffered a serious fire. They have since been repaired.

== See also ==
- Communes of the Pyrénées-Orientales department
- Saint-Nazaire de Barbadell church
