= Serrabone Priory =

Priory in Pyrénées-Orientales, France

Coordinates: 42.581°N 2.614°E

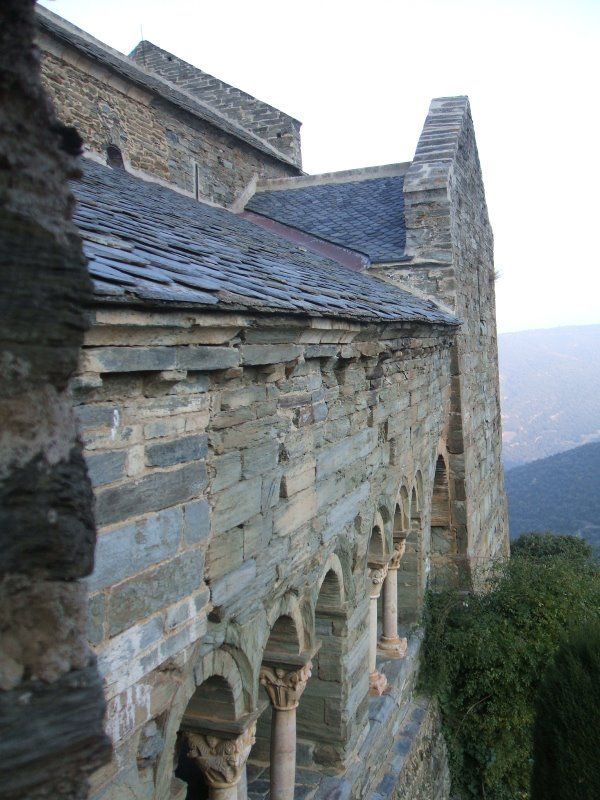
Serrabone Priory

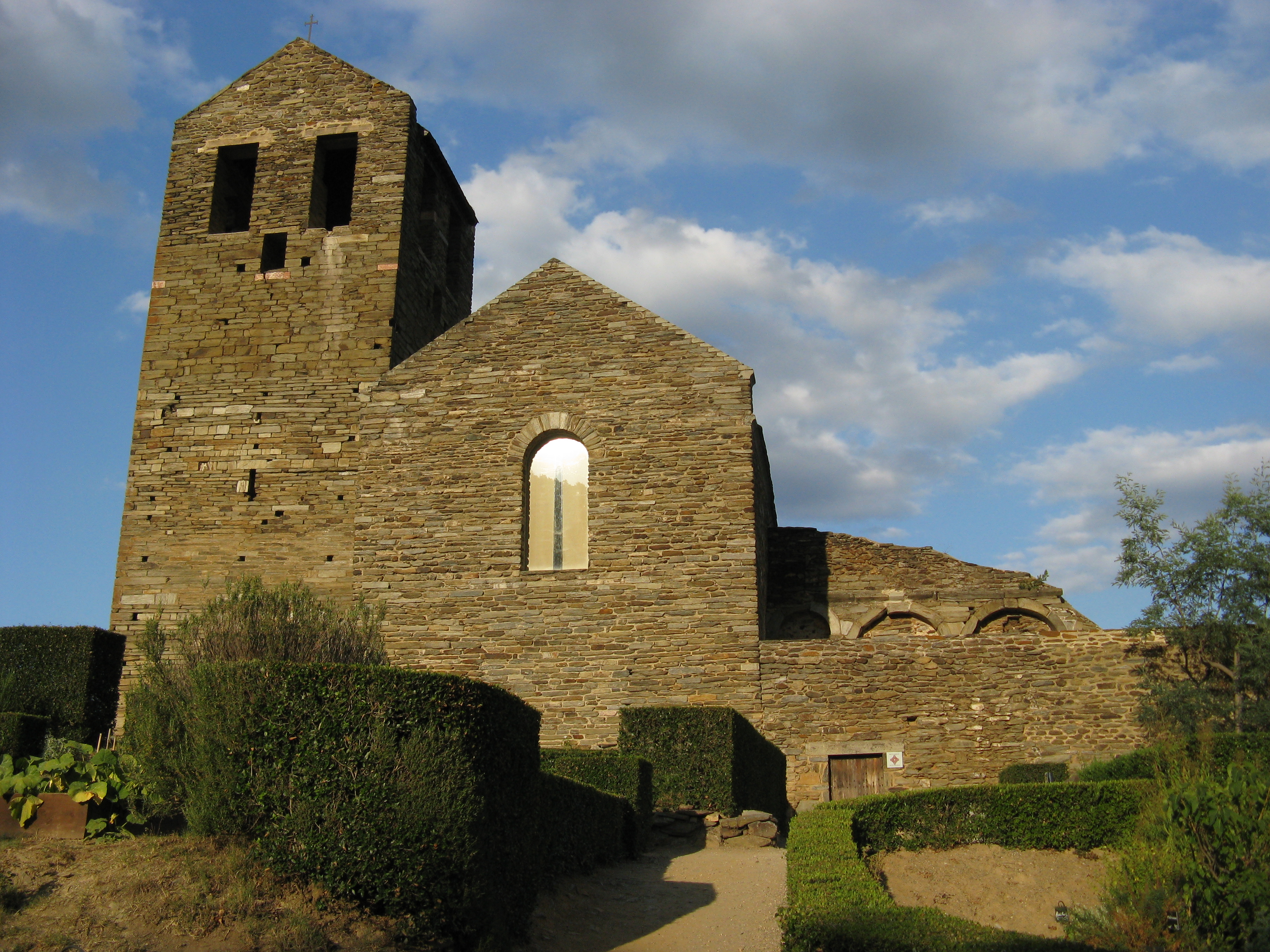
Serrabone Priory

Serrabone Priory (French: Prieuré de Serrabone; Catalan: Santa Maria de Serrabona) is a former monastery of Canons Regular in the commune of Boule-d'Amont, in Pyrénées-Orientales. The priory is located in a wild and beautiful area in the valley of the Boulès in the heart of an oak forest, at the centre of the Aspres mountain range on the eastern foothills of the Canigou, about 30 km from Perpignan.

It is famous for its splendid marble rostrum from the 12th century, regarded as a masterpiece of Romanesque art.

== History ==
The name of the monastery derives from the Catalan "serra bona", meaning "good mountain". The original foundation - of which order if any is unclear - on the site took place in the 10th or 11th century and is recorded in a document of 1069. In 1082, under the patronage of the local lords and the Count of Conflent, who gave it property and revenues, it was re-established as an Augustinian priory.

== Architecture ==
The first church at Serrabone had just one nave with a pointed barrel vault.

An extensive transformation took place in the 12th century. A transept and three apses replaced the earlier chevet. The principal apse, protruding on the exterior, is flanked by two absidoles enclosed in the walls. On the north side there is a second nave and a bell tower, on the south side a cloister, and another building containing three rooms.

The thick walls of the nave are built of local schist rubble stone. The second construction was more elaborate and used large blocks of cut schist which were carefully placed.

The sculptures in the cloister, the main portal, the window in the apsidole and the gallery, are all worked in pink marble from the Conflent, which makes a startling contrast to the green-grey of the schist.
